= Alfred Waterhouse =

British architect (1830–1905)

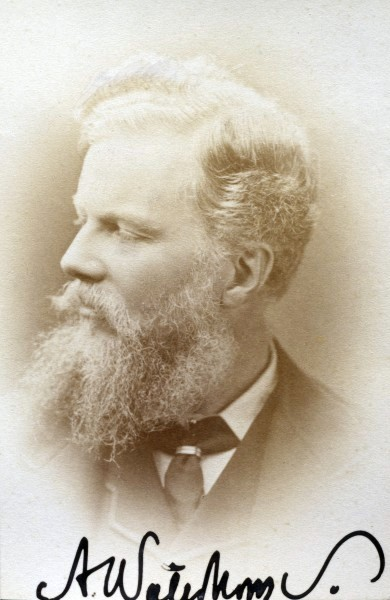
- Waterhouse
- Born: 19 July 1830; Liverpool, Lancashire, England
- Died: 22 August 1905 (aged 75); Yattendon, Berkshire, England
- Occupation: Architect
- Awards: Royal Gold Medal (1878)
- Buildings: Benwell Dene; Eaton Hall, Cheshire; Girton College, Cambridge; Holborn Bars; Hutton Hall, Guisborough; Liverpool Royal Infirmary; Manchester Assize Courts; Manchester Town Hall; National Liberal Club; Natural History Museum, London; Reading School; Clock Tower at Rochdale Town Hall; St Elisabeth's Church, Reddish; Strangeways Prison; University College Hospital; Victoria Building, University of Liverpool; Victoria University of Manchester; Yorkshire College

Alfred Waterhouse RA PPRIBA (19 July 1830 – 22 August 1905) was an English architect, particularly associated with Gothic Revival architecture, although he designed using other architectural styles as well. He is perhaps best known for his designs for Manchester Town Hall and the Natural History Museum in London. He designed other town halls, the Manchester Assize buildings—bombed in World War II—and the adjacent Strangeways Prison. He also designed several hospitals, the most architecturally interesting being the Royal Infirmary Liverpool and University College Hospital London. He was particularly active in designing buildings for universities, including both Oxford and Cambridge but also what became Liverpool, Manchester and Leeds universities. He designed many country houses, the most important being Eaton Hall in Cheshire. He designed several bank buildings and offices for insurance companies, most notably the Prudential Assurance Company. Although not a major church designer he produced several notable churches and chapels.

Waterhouse was probably the most financially successful of all Victorian architects. He designed some of the most expensive buildings of the Victorian age. The three most costly were Manchester Town Hall, Eaton Hall and the Natural History Museum; they were also among the largest buildings of their type built during the period.

Waterhouse had a reputation for being able to plan logically laid out buildings, often on awkward or cramped sites. He created soundly constructed buildings, having built up a well structured and organised architectural office, and used reliable sub-contractors and suppliers. His versatility in style also attracted clients. Though expert within Neo-Gothic, Renaissance Revival and Romanesque Revival styles, Waterhouse never limited himself to a single architectural style. He often used eclecticism in his buildings. Styles that he used occasionally include Tudor revival, Jacobethan, Italianate, and some only once or twice, such as Scottish baronial architecture, Baroque Revival, Queen Anne style architecture and Neoclassical architecture.

As with the architectural styles he used when designing his buildings, the materials and decoration also show the use of diverse materials. Waterhouse is known for the use of terracotta on the exterior of his buildings, most famously at the Natural History Museum. He also used faience, once its mass production was possible, on the interiors of his buildings. But he also used brick, often a combination of different colours, or with other materials such as terracotta and stone. This was especially the case with his buildings for the Prudential Assurance Company, educational, hospital and domestic buildings. In his Manchester Assize Courts, he used different coloured stones externally to decorate it. At Manchester Town Hall and Eaton Hall the exterior walls are almost entirely of a single type of stone. His interiors ranged from the most elaborate at Eaton Hall and Manchester Town Hall, respectively for Britain's richest man and northern England's richest city cottonopolis, to the simplest in buildings like the Royal Liverpool Infirmary, where utility and hygiene dictated the interior design, and the even starker Strangeways Prison.

== Early life and education (1830–1854) ==
His father was Alfred Waterhouse Senior (1798–1873), a cotton broker, and his mother was Mary Waterhouse, née Bevan (1805–1880), of Tottenham, both Quakers. Alfred, first of their eight children, was born on 19 July 1830 when the family was living at Stone Hill, Liverpool. Shortly after his birth, the family moved to Oakfield, a Tudor-style villa in Aigburth, Liverpool, Lancashire. His brothers were accountant Edwin Waterhouse (1841–1917), co-founder of the Price Waterhouse partnership, which now forms part of PriceWaterhouseCoopers, and solicitor Theodore Waterhouse (1838–1891), who founded the law firm Waterhouse & Co, now part of Field Fisher Waterhouse LLP in the City of London.

Alfred Waterhouse was educated at the Quaker Grove House School in Tottenham, later to become Leighton Park School.

He began his architectural studies in 1848 under Richard Lane in Manchester. He was taught to produce architectural drawings with crisp lines and pale tints, very different from the style he would develop later. He learned theory by copying extracts from books, including Henry William Inwood's Of the Resources of Design in the Architecture of Greece, Egypt, and other Countries, obtained by the Studies of the Architects of those Countries from Nature (1834) and William Chamber's A treatise on civil architecture (1759). He also traced the designs in Frederick Apthorp Paley's Manual of Gothic Mouldings (1845). The scrapbook he used in which he sets out Chambers and Paley's opposing views survives. During this period He is also known to have read John Ruskin's The Stones of Venice (1849) and Augustus Pugin's Contrasts (1836) and The True Principles of Pointed or Christian Architecture (1841). He joined a sketching club, where he met Frederic Shields and Alfred Darbyshire.

In May 1853 he set out to tour Europe with school friend Thomas Hodgkin who stated that Waterhouse "was entirely under the influence of Ruskin, and communicated his own admiration for Gothic art and a perfect detestation of that beastly Renaissance". The trip lasted nine months. Sailing to Dieppe, passing through Rouen, then Paris, taking a steamer from Dijon down the Saône to Lyon, then on to Nîmes, Arles and Orange. Staying the night at the Grande Chartreuse, passing into Piedmont to Susa and Turin, they walked over the Great St Bernard Pass in a snowstorm into Switzerland. In Basel Waterhouse parted company with Hodgkin and returned to Italy in the company of a Manchester acquaintance George Rooke. Waterhouse's sketchbook from the trip survives and is titled Scraps from France, Switzerland, and Italy. Every notebook sketch is dated and labelled so his itinerary can be followed. In Italy he visited Isola Bella, Certosa di Pavia, Milan, Bergamo, Monza and Venice where he remained for two weeks in August. Here he sketched the Doge's Palace and St Mark's Basilica. The tour continued in Padua, Vicenza and Verona. By the end of September he arrived in Florence, where he stayed a week, sketching Giotto's Campanile, amongst other buildings. He continued via Siena, Fiesole, Lucca and Pisa to Naples, where he stayed around three weeks and toured surrounding towns. In November he arrived in Rome and stayed into the new year. Returning to northern Italy he revisited several cities before passing through Turin on the way to Basel and Strasbourg.

Much later in life, Waterhouse in his 1890 presidential address at the RIBA had this to say about sketching by architectural students:

If the architect-student knew that it is not by mere number and beauty of his sketches, and by the accuracy of his measured drawings of old edifices, that he could satisfy those who sent him forth on his travels, but by the proofs he was able to afford that he had absorbed and digested what he had seen,....men would be more ready designers after having had such preparation. Having got the ancient examples into their heads, instead of merely in their sketchbooks, they would learn to lean not on illustrations and other extraneous help, but on what had become part of themselves, and so prove not mere copyists, but self-reliant and original designers."

On his return to Britain, Alfred set up in 1854 his own architectural practice based in Cross Street Chambers, Manchester.

== Manchester practice (1854–1865) ==
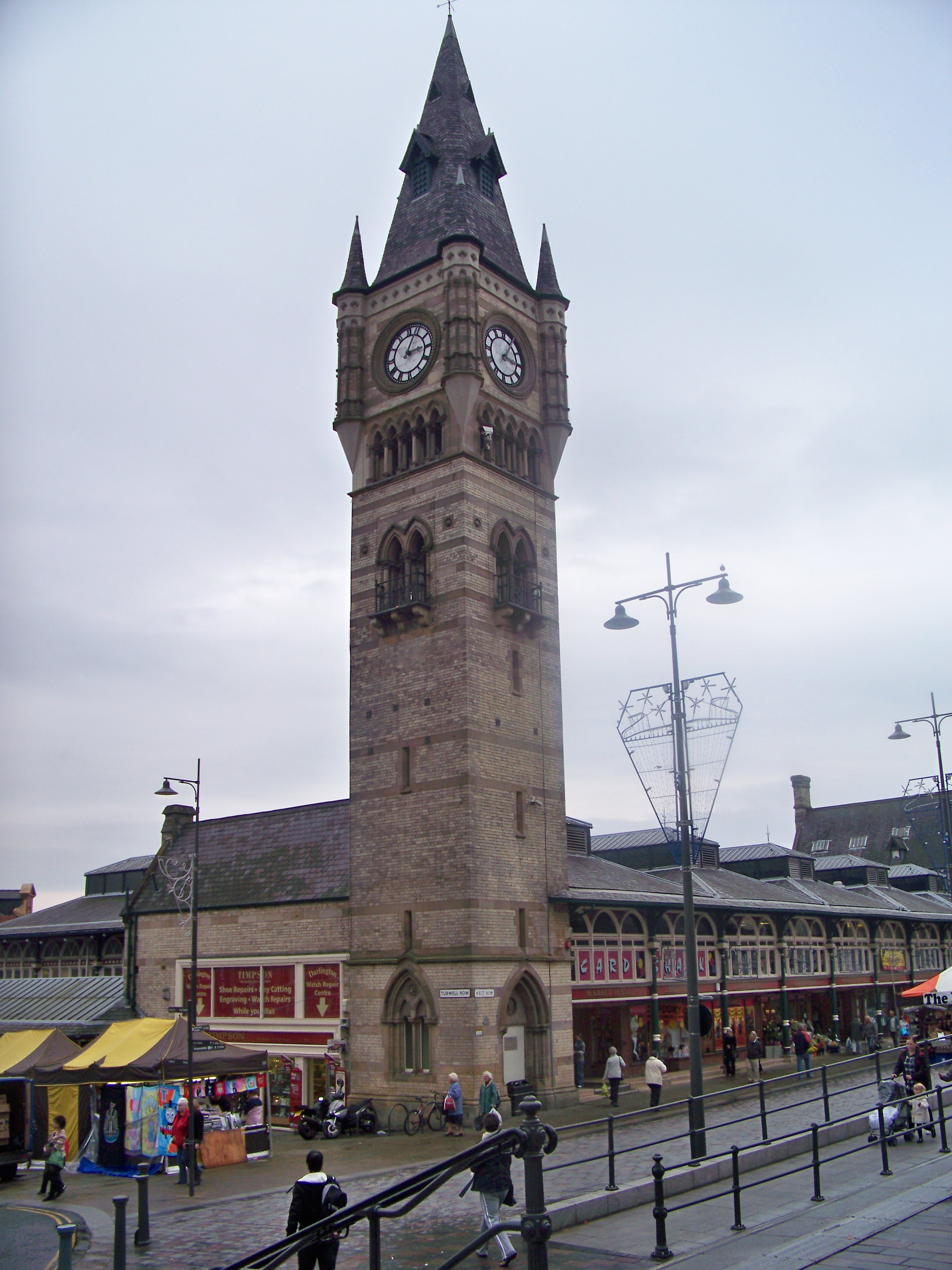
Darlington Market and clock tower (1861-64) Waterhouse's first public building outside Manchester, the market hall was Waterhouse's only cast-iron building

Waterhouse continued to practice in Manchester for 11 years, until moving his practice to London in 1865. At this stage of his career most of his commissions were either in the north-west or north-east of England. His earliest commissions were mainly for domestic buildings. Among Waterhouse's first commissions in 1854 were for his family: a set of stables at Sneyd Park, for his father, who had moved to Bristol, and alterations to the home of his uncle Roger Waterhouse at Mossley Bank in Liverpool. In executing the commission for the cemetery buildings at Warrington Road, Ince in Makerfield (1855–56), he began his move towards designing public buildings in his developing Neo-Gothic style, building a lodge for the registrar, and two chapels, one Church of England in Gothic style, and one for Roman Catholic and Non-conformists in Norman style. His first commission for a commercial building was for the now demolished Binyon & Fryer warehouse and sugar refinery in Chester Street, Manchester (1855). The building was of two floors made of brick with stone dressings and Italianate in style. The intended upper floors based on the Doge's Palace remained unbuilt. Also he designed the Droylesden Institute (1858, demolished) in the Manchester suburb of Droylsden. It contained a reading room and other educational facilities and had some Gothic details. A similar building was the Bingley Mechanics' Institute built (1862–65), located in Bingley, with a hall and reading room in a Gothic style.

His first large new country house design was Hinderton Hall (1856–57), Cheshire, for Liverpool merchant Christopher Bushell, built of red sandstone, slate roofs, stables, gardener's cottage and boundary walls. Hinderton, Gothic in style, is very restrained and plain compared with his more mature works. Representative of the several suburban houses of his early career is New Heys (1861–65), Allerton, Liverpool, built for lawyer W.G. Benson at a cost of £6,700 (approx £800,000 in 2019), built of brick with stone dressing, with slate roof, it included stables, conservatory, garden layout and furniture.

In Nantwich, Churchside, Waterhouse designed the former Manchester and Liverpool District Bank (1863–66), built of red brick. It included the manager's house. Waterhouse's first completely new parish church was the Anglican St John the Divine (1863), Brooklands Road, Sale, Cheshire. It is Gothic, built of Hollington stone, with aisles and transepts, patterned brickwork inside, with external stonework of a single colour. The design of the roof is also restrained compared with Waterhouse's later designs. Other early chapels included three for the Congregational church, Ancoats (1861–65, demolished), Rusholme (1863, demolished) and the Besses o' th' Barn (1863) now United Reform church, all were Gothic in style.

Waterhouse had connections with wealthy Quaker industrialists through schooling, marriage and religious affiliations, many of whom commissioned him to design and build country houses, especially near Darlington. Several were built for members of the Backhouse family, founders of Backhouse's Bank, a forerunner of Barclays Bank. In Darlington Backhouse's Bank is of 1864-67. For Alfred Backhouse, Waterhouse built Pilmore Hall (1863), now known as Rockliffe Hall, in Hurworth-on-Tees. Waterhouse designed for Joseph Pease Hutton Hall in Yorkshire (1864–71), a large house Gothic of red brick with stone dressings and a slate roof. The commission included the gardens; the billiard room and conservatory were added in (1871–74) and there were further alterations and new stables added in 1875. Hutton Hall also had a feature unique in a Waterhouse house: Victorian Turkish baths. The first of his significant public buildings outside Manchester was Darlington town clock and covered market hall (1861–64) in Gothic style, with the market built from cast iron, divided into five sections. The main building contractor was R. Stapp; chimneypieces were provided by Joseph Bonehill; the iron work was by F.A. Skidmore and J.W. Russell & Son and the clerk of works was S. Harrison. The building cost £9,851, with an extension and repairs (1865–66) costing £2,615. The clock tower was paid for by Joseph Pease.

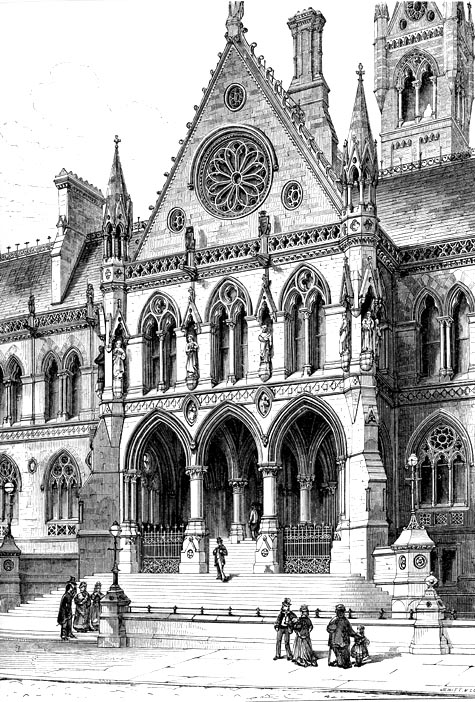
Manchester Assize Courts (1859–65), showing the elaborate carving on the building's facade: what the drawing cannot show is the different coloured stones used

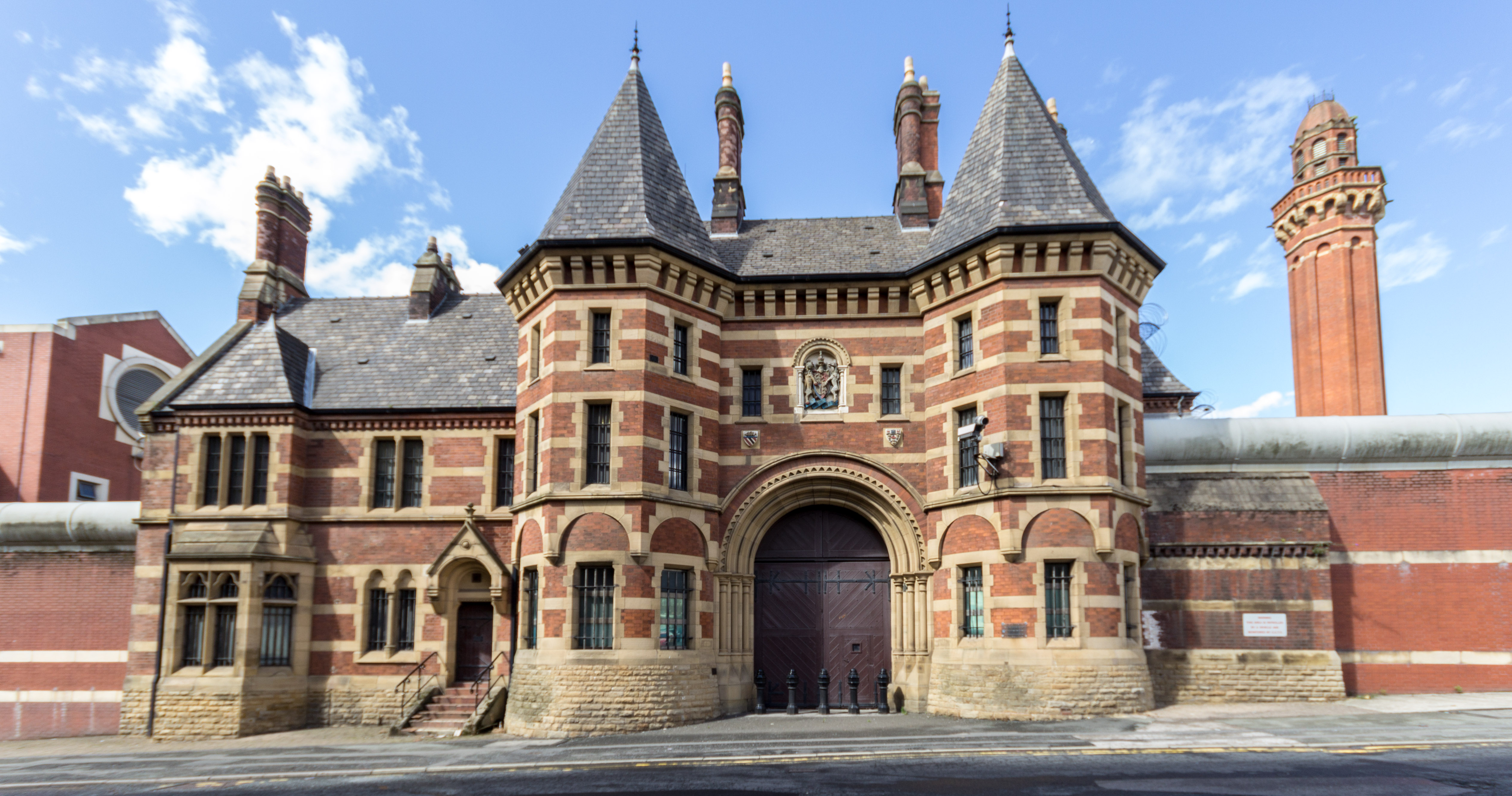
Gatehouse, Strangeways Prison (1861–69), French Chateau style, main arch is Romanesque, with Gothic window details, the tall 'chimney' on the right was part of the ventilation system

During his period in Manchester Waterhouse's most important commissions were for the Assize Courts and Strangeways prison. The competition to design the new Manchester Assize Courts was launched in 1859. It received 107 entries, by many leading architects including: Edward Middleton Barry; Cuthbert Brodrick; a joint entry by Richard Norman Shaw and William Eden Nesfield; Edward Buckton Lamb; Thomas Worthington; and the runner up Thomas Allom. His success as a designer of public buildings was assured when he won the competition. The building, constructed 1859–65 (now demolished) not only showed his ability to plan a complicated building on a large scale, but also marked him out as a champion of the Gothic cause. The building cost £120,000 (approx £14,500,000 in 2019) to build. The Gothic style of the building was influenced by John Ruskin and his views on Venetian Gothic architecture. Designer John Gregory Crace carried out the elaborate decoration in the Grand Jury Room and the elaborate carving in the central hall was by O'Shea and Whelan. The exterior also had elaborate decoration in contrasting coloured stonework with sculpture and carvings. The foundations were dug by H. Southern & Co.; the building's superstructure was erected by Samuel Bramall; heating and ventilation was the responsibility of G.N. Haden as well as O'Shea and Whelan. Stone carving was also done by Thomas Woolner and Farmer & Brindley; ceramic tiles were provided by Thomas Oakenden; stained glass was by R.B Edmundson, Lavers & Barraud, George Shaw and Heaton, Butler & Bayne; furniture and furnishings were provided by Doveston, Bird & Hull, James Lamb, Kendal & Co., J. Beaumont, Minton & Co. and Marsh & Jones Co.; iron work was by F.A. Skidmore & R. Jones; chimneypieces were by J. Bonehill, W. Wilson and H. Patterson; plaster ceiling roses were by J.W. Hindshaw. The clerk of works were John Shaw, G.O. Roberts and Henry Littler. This building was Waterhouse's first exercise in High Victorian Gothic.

John Ruskin, writing to his father in 1863:

I have had a nice day in Manchester....the Assize Courts are much beyond everything yet done in England on my principles. The hall is one of the finest things I have ever seen: even the painted glass is good... It is vast and full of sculpture and very impressive.

The Times edition of 11 February 1867, in an article entitled The New Courts of Law, declared that the Manchester Assize Courts were "the best courts of law in the world. Writing in 1872 in his book History of the Gothic Revival, Charles Eastlake had this to say about the building:

Time has shown that Mr Waterhouse's plan for the Assize Courts is admirably adapted for its purpose and, with regard to the artistic merit of the work, it will be time enough to criticise when any better modern structure of its size and style has been raised in this country.

Eastlake went on to describe the interior:

The interior of the great hall is most successful in its proportions. It has an open timber Hammerbeam roof, and a large pointed window with geometrical tracery, at each end. The doorways leading hence to corridors and adjoining offices are studied with great care; and indeed the same may be said of every feature in the hall, from its inlaid pavement to the pendant gasaliers [Sic]. The Civil Court and the Criminal Court (each holding about 800 people) are respectively to the north-east and south-east of the hall. They are identical in size and arrangement, and are provided with the usual retiring rooms for judges and juries.

The Builder in 1859 described the buildings style:

The character is ...Gothic...yet neither English nor....Venetian .

The Ecclesiologist in 1861 described it as:

New Secular Gothic, partly French, partly Italian, partly English...the most important specimen of civic Gothic which the revival has yet produced.

As a consequence of the success in the competition for the new court building Waterhouse was given the commission in December 1861 to design the new Strangeways Prison. This was immediately behind the Assize Courts. When completed in 1869 the prison cost £170,000 (approx £20,500,000 in 2019). Waterhouse adopted the radial plan of HM Prison Pentonville and showed his plans to its designer Joshua Jebb for his approval. The plan consists of six wings, three storeys high, opening off a twelve-sided central hall. Although the main prison is in a simplified Gothic style, there are also some Romanesque details. The entrance gatehouse is in French Chateau style, with banded stone and brickwork. There was also a Governor's house and boundary walls. The interiors were easily the starkest designed by Waterhouse, devoid of all but the most basic of decoration. The prison was built by the company owned by Mrs Bramall; heating and ventilation was by G.N. Haden; tiles by J. Grundy & Woolfscraft; window glass was provided by R.B. Edmubndson; chimneypieces by W. Wilson; iron work by R. Jones and F.A. Skidmore; fittings for the gas lighting by Hart, Son, Peard & Co. The clerk of works was Henry Littler.

== London practice (1865–1902) ==
Waterhouse's move to London, was at a fortuitous time. The capital was undergoing major expansion and rebuilding in the 1860s. Both his brothers Edwin and Theodore were already living there. Before his move he had already been commissioned to design the Quaker-run Alexander and Cunliffe's Bank (1864–67) in Lombard Street, City of London, (demolished), Italianate with Gothic features, four-storied of stone. The competition to design the Royal Courts of Justice was by invitation only. It was decided in late 1865 to limit it to six competitors, of which Waterhouse was one. The instructions were drafted in 1866. Due to objections the number of invited architects was increased to twelve. But John Gibson dropped out leaving eleven: Waterhouse, William Burges, George Gilbert Scott, John Pollard Seddon, Edward Middleton Barry, the little known Henry Robert Abrahms, the also obscure Henry B. Garling, John Raphael Rodrigues Brandon, Henry Francis Lockwood, Thomas Deane and the eventual winner George Edmund Street. All the competitors chose to produce Gothic designs. Waterhouse's design was based around two large halls that formed a cruciform design. The lower level of the north-south hall was for the general public with short corridors linked to staircases leading to public galleries in the courtrooms. The east-west hall 478 by 60 feet, crossed the lower one at upper level reserved for the use by lawyers. There were four towers the tallest 354 feet in height. Waterhouse explained the building's plan:

In the plan I submit separate entrance is provided for nearly ever class which can be considered independent of the rest...Judges, Jurors, Witnesses, Registrars, Shorthand Writers, and general public would all have their special entrances and might enter of leave the Court without disturbing those around them.

The Building News magazine issue of February 1867 reviewed Waterhouse's drawings of the design:

..finished in such a thoroughly artistic manner that not only do they far transcend the perspectives of all the other competitors, but might very fairly take rank among the architectural drawings of any water-colour exhibition"

There were seven judges. After the first round of voting, the three designs that were in the running were Barry's with two votes, Street's with two votes and Waterhouse's with three votes. Waterhouse's design was supported by the two lawyers Cockburn and Palmer on the jury. After the second round, Barry had four votes and Street three. After much political intrigue, Street was appointed the winner at the end of 1868.

=== Organisation of Waterhouse's architectural office ===
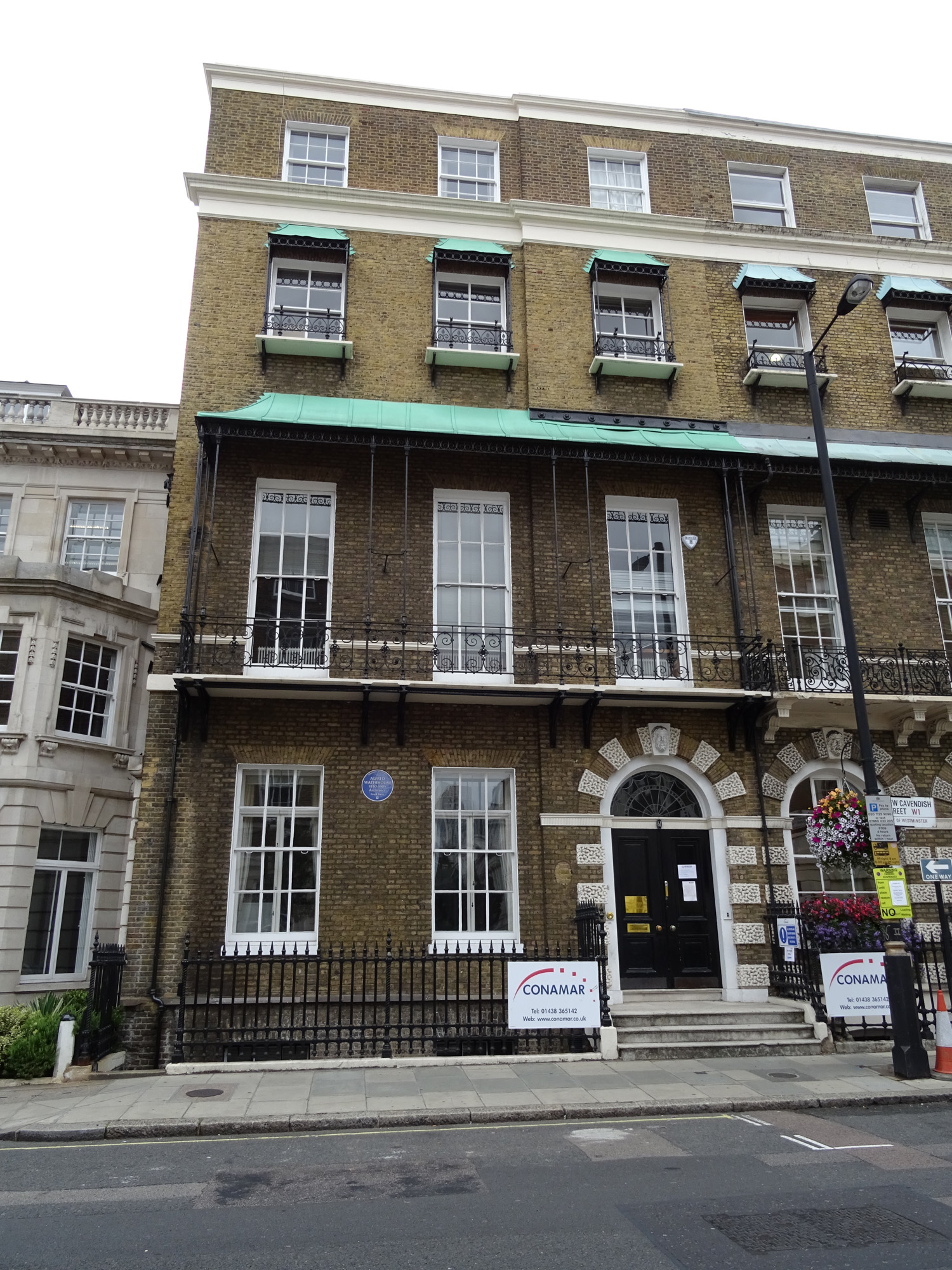
61 New Cavendish Street, Marylebone, London, Waterhouse's practice was based here from 1865, it was also his home, Paul Waterhouse used the house until 1909 after Alfred had died in 1905.

To cope with the large number of architectural projects the office handled, efficient organisation of the office was vital. At its peak the office could be designing up to thirty different projects at a time. Over his 48-year career Waterhouse employed dozens of draughtsmen and assistants. On setting up the London Office Waterhouse's chief clerk, Willey sought the advice of Waterhouse's brother Edwin:

upon one or two features which I think it desirable to introduce into the bookkeeping of this establishment. First we have no Day Book - no book in which charges appear as a matter of course as soon as our clients become liable for them. Each draughtsman keeps a register of his work which is abstracted monthly and yearly...There is also a journal in which the charges to clients are entered. But I believe no rule whatever has been followed in entering these charges. I think the system is chiefly defective as in the Time Abstracts there is no provision for describing what the labour was expended upon-nor for showing whether it was expended upon one work only or upon several. Indeed it is Mr W's belief that many charges for small works given him by clients for whom perhaps large works were at the time in hand have never been made.

The salaries Waterhouse paid ranged from 5 shillings per week (about £30 in 2019) for an office lad to £3 per week (about £363 in 2019) for senior draughtsman like C.H. Scott who worked for Waterhouse from 1859 to 1875 and chief clerk John Willey worked for Waterhouse from 1859 to 1865. A senior draughtsman would typically be responsible for several projects, T. Cooper worked for Waterhouse from 1865 to 1876 covered Backhouse's Bank, Strangeways Prison, Allerton Priory, Foxhill, The Natural History Museum and Eaton Hall. Supervision was entrusted to assistants such as Giles Redmayne who worked for Waterhouse 1859-64, occasionally they would take over jobs in their own right. However, there were never many in the office, Waterhouse would regularly check and correct drawings himself, often he worked alone in the office long after the staff had left for the day. The office had to produce vast numbers of drawings, up to 1875 there were 88 known employees of the office, 29 worked for less than a year some of whom lasted less than a month, 25 draughtsmen were employed for a year or two, of the remaining 33 only 5 lasted through 1865-75.

Under the supervision of one of the seniors a team would be assembled for each job, for example forty draughtsmen were involved at Manchester Town Hall, although it was usually below twenty at any given time. The drawings from 1858 were consistent in style throughout Waterhouse's career, it was a crisp style with strong lines with colour coding, buff red for brick, yellow for stone, brown for timber, blue for metal. Blueprints were introduced into the office in c.1890.

Waterhouse also employed his own quantity surveyor, from 1860 to 1875 this was Michael Robinson, though of the one hundred jobs he was involved in most were in the north. Waterhouse also sought reliable clerk of works, for example J. Battye, he worked on the Manchester Assize Courts, Yorkshire College and the Victoria Building University of Liverpool. Building contractors were vital in ensuring Waterhouse's designs were both soundly built and faithful to the design, he favoured firms like Parnell's of Rugby who built 16 of his buildings or Holland and Hannen who built 13 buildings. He often chose locally based building contractors like Stephens & Bastow of Reading for his buildings in the area.

==== Artists, suppliers and sub-contractors ====
Also of importance to the success of Waterhouse's architectural practice were good quality subcontractors, for example for stained-glass in his early career he favoured Lavers, Barraud and Westlake, whereas the more famous Clayton and Bell only received two orders from Waterhouse, later he preferred Heaton, Butler and Bayne. Frederic Shields designed the sixteen stained-glass windows in the Chapel at Eaton Hall as well as the accompanying mosaic decoration. Hardman & Co. was used occasionally for metalwork. In the 1860s he used Mintons or Maw & Co for ceramic tiles. Later he preferred Craven Dunnill or William Godwin. For furniture Maple & Co. and Liberty's were favoured, though for Holborn Bars the Gloster Wagon Company provided the office furniture. He tried Francis Skidmore for decorative iron work at Eaton Hall, but finding him unreliable turned to Robert Jones of Manchester and Hart, Son, Peard and Co. for the rest of his career. Jesse Rust & Co. were responsible for executing many mosaic floors in Waterhouse's buildings and the wall mosaics in Eaton Hall Chapel. For heating systems he favoured Haden's of Trowbridge or W.W. Phipson. Other suppliers were Guynan's for blinds and Gibbons of Wolverhampton for locks.

Many of Waterhouse's buildings include carving and sculpture, Thomas Earp was commissioned on about a dozen occasions most notably Harris's Bank Leighton Buzzard and St Elizabeth's Reddish. Farmer & Brindley were favoured for sculpture, working on nearly one hundred of Waterhouse's buildings, including a tombstone in West Norwood Cemetery, the pulpit in Stanmore Church and the extensive carving on Eaton Hall, plus all the models for the terracotta decoration on the Prudential Assurance buildings. The ceiling of the Great Hall, at the Natural History Museum, is decorated with paintings of plants from across the world, the paintings are executed in a subdued palette and with gilding for highlights, the individual panels have the Latin name of the plant below. Designed by Waterhouse the ceiling was painted by Best & Lea of John Dalton Street, Manchester. The most famous artworks to adorn one of Waterhouse's buildings are The Manchester Murals, painted by Ford Madox Brown in the Great Hall at Manchester Town Hall.

==== The Waterhouse drawings collection ====
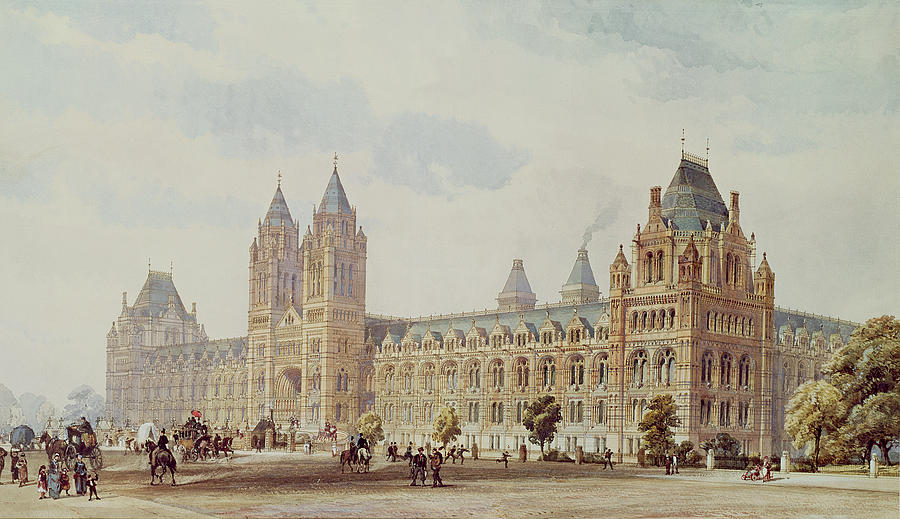
Waterhouse's watercolour perspective of the Natural History Museum London 1876, in the collection of the V&A Museum. Note the side facades – the east one is just visible on the right – were never built.

The Royal Institute of British Architects Drawings Collection housed in the dedicated study room at Victoria and Albert Museum contains over 9,000 of the drawings from Waterhouse's practice. The collection covers pages from note-books up to metre square drawings, rough onsite sketches to highly finished watercolours perspectives of complete buildings. The drawings span Waterhouse's full career from the 1850s to 1901. Each finished drawing has two numbers normally in the top left corner: the first of upper number is the 'office number' that related to a now lost register in which the draughtsmen's time was recorded; the second number is the 'job number', records the sequence of drawings for an individual commission, against which charges for the client were calculated. Each of the completed drawings is also dated, some surviving sheets are either unnumbered or damaged. A smaller commission may have needed as few as fifty drawings. Most of the drawings are anonymous and thanks to the uniform style of production it is not possible to distinguish individuals, though some of the seniors in the office like G.T. Redmayne were allowed to initial drawings. In the very early years of his practice the lettering used on the drawings was Gothic, but this was abandoned by the mid-1860s for a plain script. Waterhouse was known for his ability to paint watercolour perspectives, sometimes they were produced for architectural competitions such as the entry for The Royal Courts of Justice competition and Manchester Town Hall, but based on their dates sometimes they were produced towards the end of the building process, most likely for publication. Some of the drawings were produced onsite with annotations by the clerk of works alerting the office staff to problems in the design, in a few cases the replies to these have survived. Some drawings were annotated by the client for example The Duke of Westminster queried the design of the screen in the Chapel at Eaton Hall. The collection allows a detailed picture of how the office functioned to be built up, although not unique for the period it is rare. None of the sets of drawings is complete and several of Waterhouse's commissions are no longer represented in the collection.

In addition to the collection at the RIBA, the Natural History Museum holds a significant quantity of drawings by Waterhouse relating to the design of the terracotta sculpture on the building. The 136 pages of drawings are bound together in two volumes and cover the period 1874 to 1878. The subject matter is not just flora, insects, fish, lizards, snakes and animals, some of extinct species, but ornament as well. Extinct species decorated the eastern side of the building internally and externally, living species likewise decorated the western half of the building as well as the North Hall and Main Hall. The designs are for the sculpture on the top of the facade, gargoyles, column capitals, friezes, relief panels, lunettes, spandrels and other architectural features of the building, both external and internal. These drawings would be turned into the finished terracotta by Gibbs and Canning, who employed Brindley and Farmer and their employee a Frenchman M. Dujardin to do so.

Other institutions have holdings of Waterhouse drawings: the Public Record Office have drawings for the Natural History Museum; the Victoria and Albert Museum holds several of his perspective drawings; Manchester School of Architecture have drawings and perspectives of Manchester Town Hall and some of his other buildings; Balliol College, Oxford, drawings for his work at the College; The Waterhouse family still own some of his drawings, sketches and watercolours.

===== Gallery of drawings produced by Waterhouse's practice =====
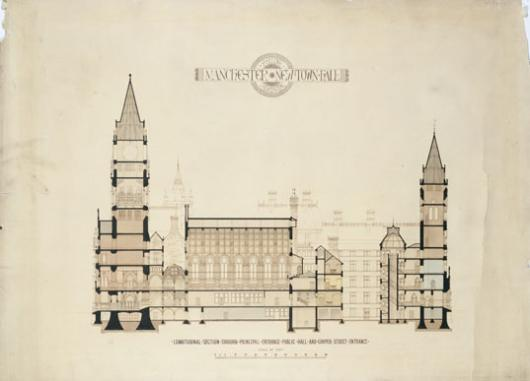
Cross section through Manchester Town Hall for 1866 entry in the competition, note the use of colour coding, much faded with age

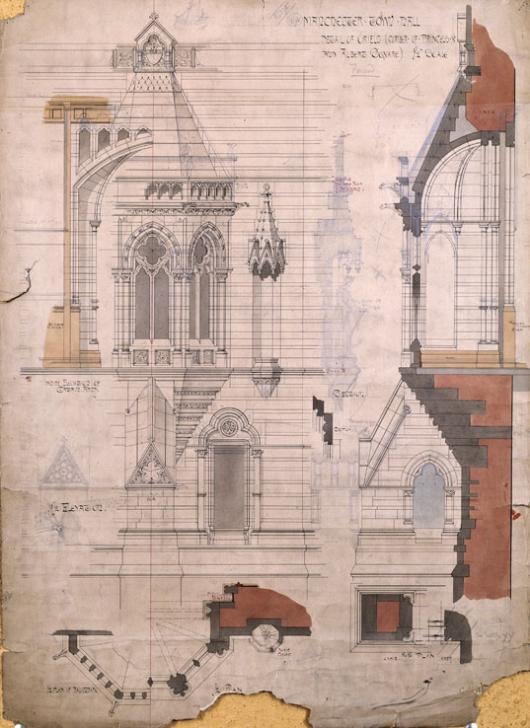
Working drawing for a Gothic oriel window on Manchester Town Hall c.1868, located on the first floor on the corner of Princess Street and Albert Square, it lights the Banqueting Room, judging by the damage this was almost certainly used on the building site

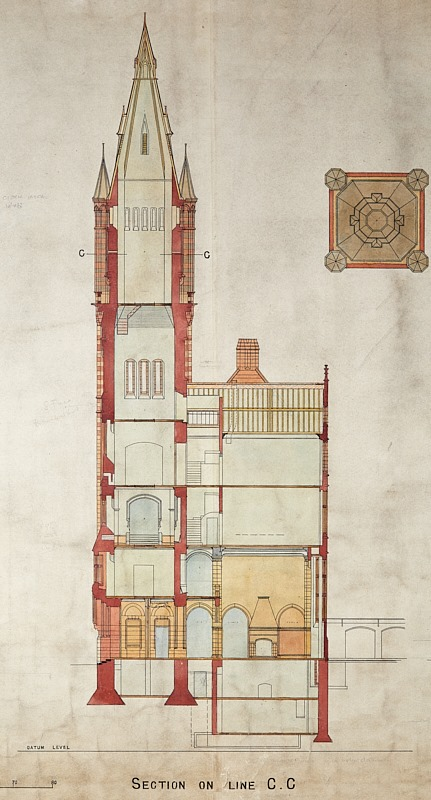
Cross section of the tower of the Victoria Building University of Liverpool c.1887

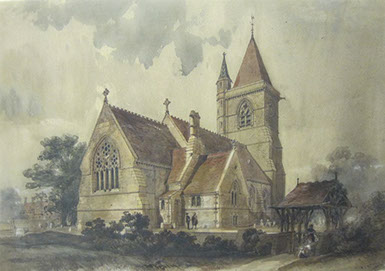
Watercolour of the design for Blackmoor Parish Church 1870

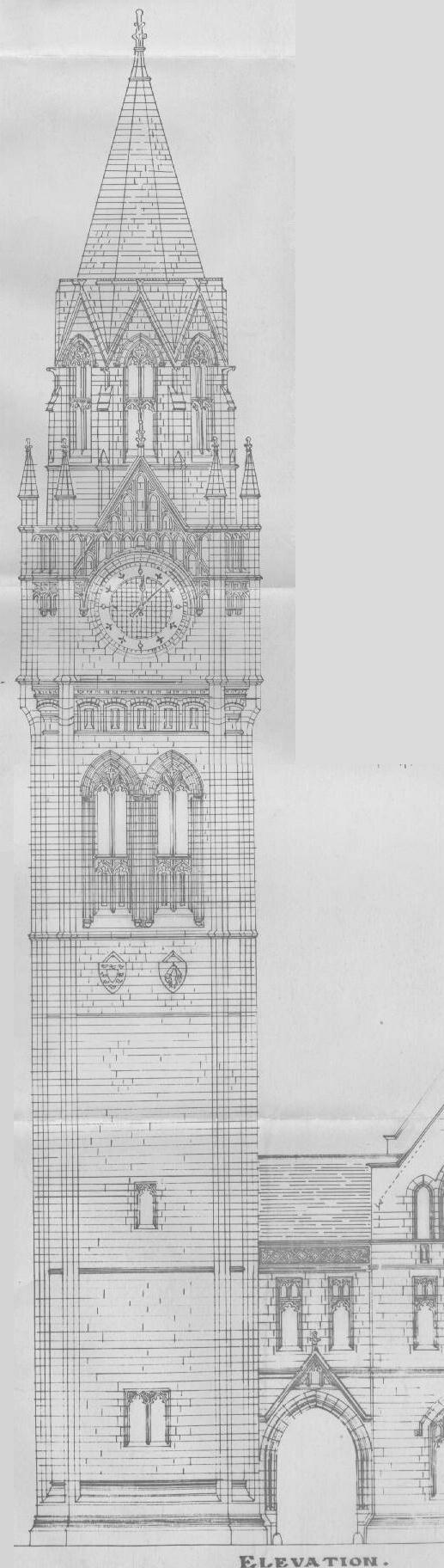
The design for the Clock Tower at Rochdale Town Hall c.1885

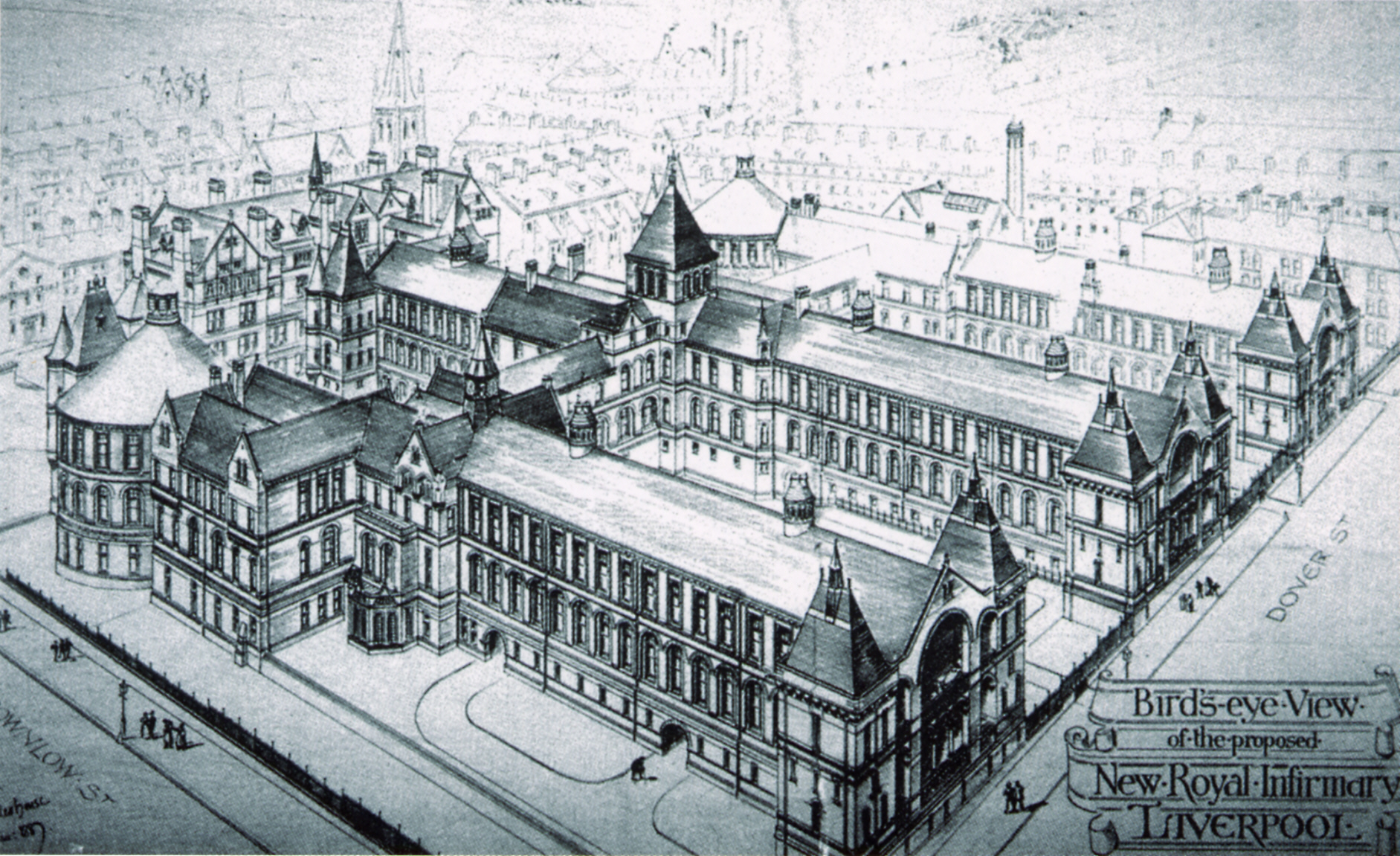
Aerial view of the design for Liverpool Royal Infirmary c.1886, the administration building is top left, the three blocks of medical wards on the right, visible are the two round structures containing the surgical wards, all are linked by the spine corridor

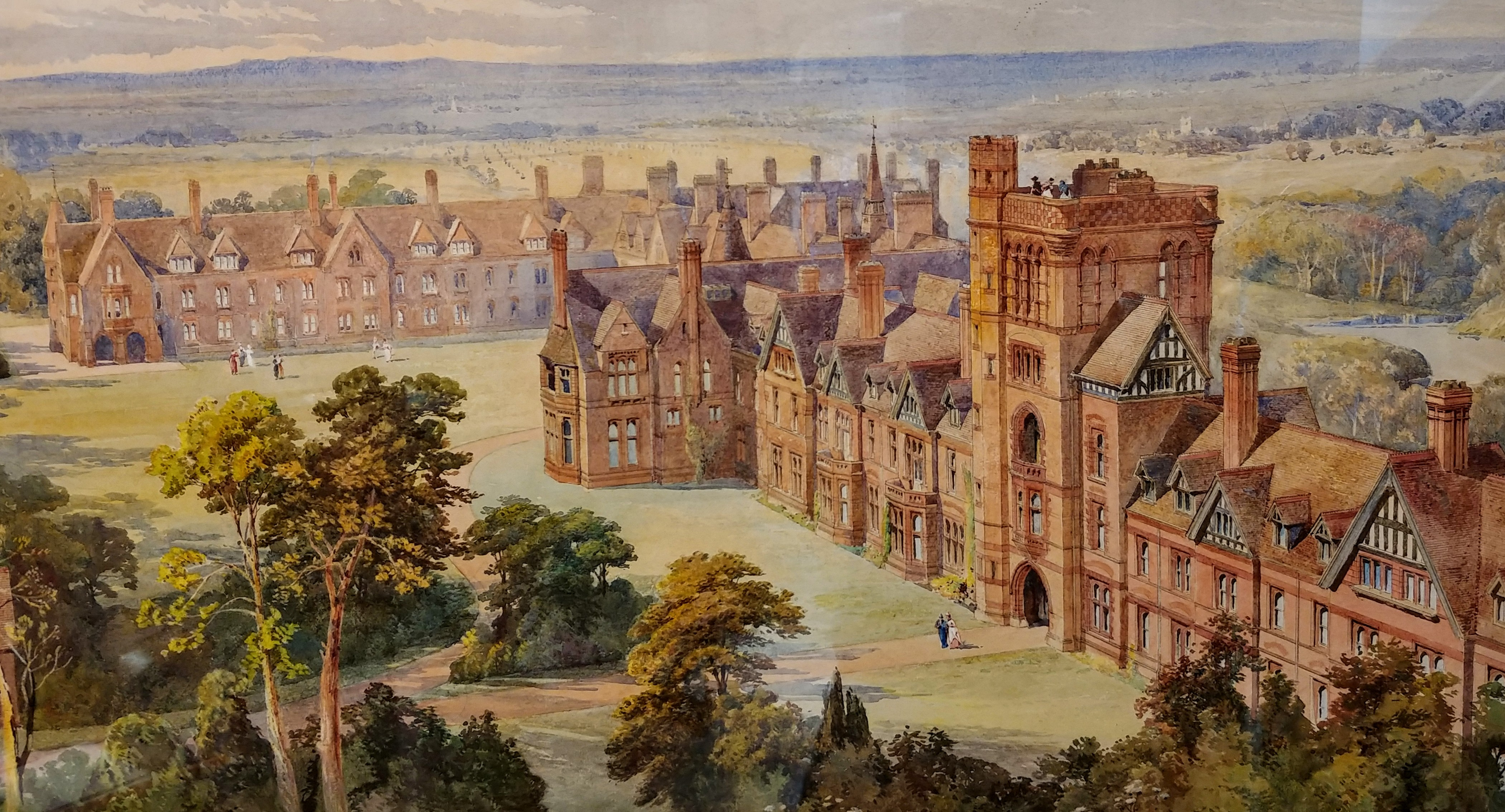
Watercolour Perspective of Girton College, painted by Waterhouse in 1887, at this date the buildings on the right with the gate-tower were under construction

==== Waterhouse as a planner of buildings ====
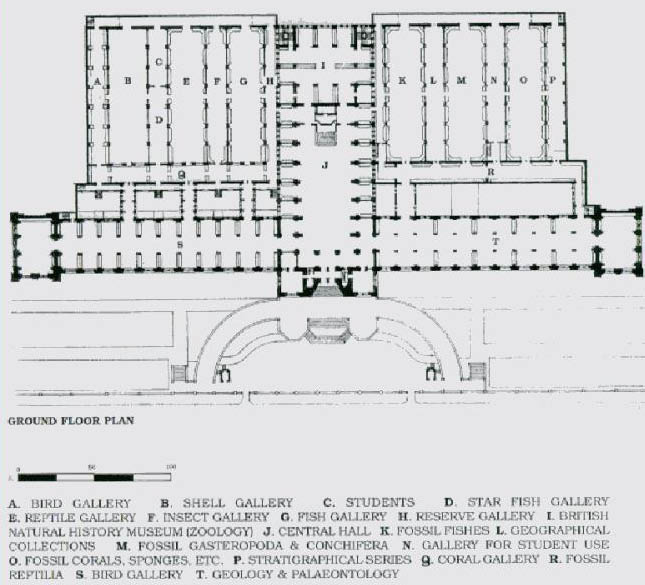
Plan of the Natural History Museum London 1881, showing the layout of the galleries on the main floor

Waterhouse has a lasting reputation as a planner of efficient buildings, he was adept at using awkward sites to advantage, and with his public buildings combining large and small rooms and circulation spaces in a coherent manner.

Part of Waterhouse's presidential address at the Royal Institute of British Architects in 1890 addresses the subject of planning buildings:

Your buildings must faithfully adapt themselves to those for whom you build: must embody their requirements, and give what they want, in the most direct way possible, Do not let the conventionalities of style interfere with this. First find out exactly what is wanted; never think about the elevation of your building, till you have ascertained this, and embodied it in your plans as fully and perfectly as you can. Afterwards clothe the building so planned in the most fitting dress you can devise. That dress may be in many cases extremely simple, in others ornate; it may have to be sometimes severe, sometimes of exquisite beauty, if you can make it so. As you have in the first instance been solicitous that your building should adapt itself in every way to the needs and conditions of the people who are to use it, so now strive that every detail of the dress in which you clothe it shall help to make its purpose clear

==== Building materials and service technology ====
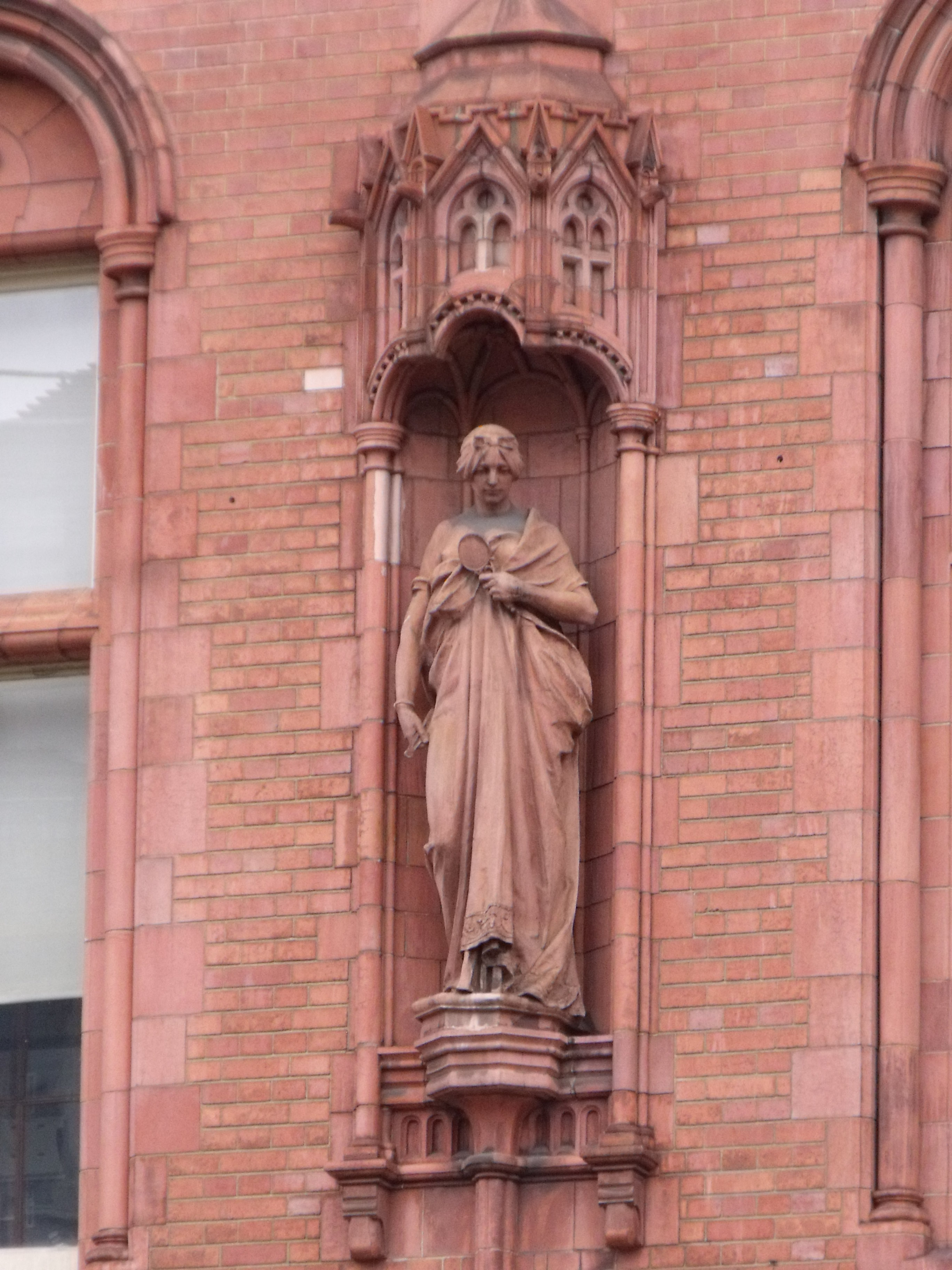
Terracotta Gothic niche and statue of Prudence, Holborn Bars, above the main entrance arch on High Holborn c.1901, the statue is almost classical in style it was sculpted by F.M. Pomeroy

Waterhouse is well known for his use of terracotta and faience as a building material, one of the driving factors being its resistance to air pollution, an increasing problem as the industrial age advanced. He relied on Gibbs and Canning to supply the terracotta for the Natural History Museum, who he worked with to improve the quality of the material. He used Gibbs and Canning for Holborn Bars, though for the regional Prudential buildings terracotta from Ruabon was used. Waterhouse liked terracotta because of its versatility giving him control over the texture of his buildings. Waterhouse had this to say about irregularity in colouring found in terracotta:

the fire would at once give us those beautiful tints of which we might avail ourselves if we chose boldly to use them

He used terracotta in buildings of all styles from the Romanesque of the Natural History Museum, the Early English Gothic at Girton College, or the Perpendicular Gothic at St Paul's School Hammersmith, even neoclassical at the Parrot House Eaton Hall. When Burmantofts Pottery developed their process to produce faience in 1879 Waterhouse started using it for his interiors. Most notably at The Victoria Building, University of Liverpool; the Chapel, Royal Liverpool Infirmary; Yorkshire College; the National Liberal Club and the final phase of Holborn Bars. He especially liked to clad columns in faience, but walls and fireplaces as well. He also made much use of glazed tiles and terracotta within buildings, for example in the corridors at Manchester Town Hall.

He was fairly cautious in the use of cast iron, a result of a problem with the market building at Darlington, his only known building failure. On the opening day the floor gave way, pitching two prize bulls and a spectator into the basement. The problem was traced to a faulty casting and Waterhouse was exonerated of any blame. This left him distrustful of the material, though he did use it in his designs. When using the material he used either Andrew Handyside and Company or J.S. Bergheim, both of whom supplied the iron for Manchester Town Hall. He was more at home using decorative wrought iron, especially for balustrades, iron screens and gates, finials and other decorative uses of the material.

Waterhouse was a great enthusiast for the use of brick, especially as the abolition of the Brick tax in 1850 had lowered the price of the material. Until the early 1870s much of Waterhouse's brickwork was polychrome in nature using decoration such as diapering, later he preferred plain brick often with dressings of contrasting material. His sketchbooks are full of details of brickwork on the continent. He never used coloured tiles on his roofs but occasionally designed patterned slate roofs, as on Manchester Town Hall. He also enjoyed using stone, he delivered a lecture on the subject at the Royal Academy of Art in 1885. He used polychromatic stonework at Manchester Assize Courts. His timber work is characterised by its solidity and large size of the members.

Generally he provided open fires to heat his buildings, in Manchester Town Hall he used a Plenum space heating system, distributing hot air up the stairwells. From the 1880s he increasingly used electric light instead of gas lighting he used in his earlier buildings, he also introduced lifts and Plenum heating and ventilation.

===== Gallery of external decorative elements on Waterhouse's buildings, often appropriate to or symbolic of the buildings use =====
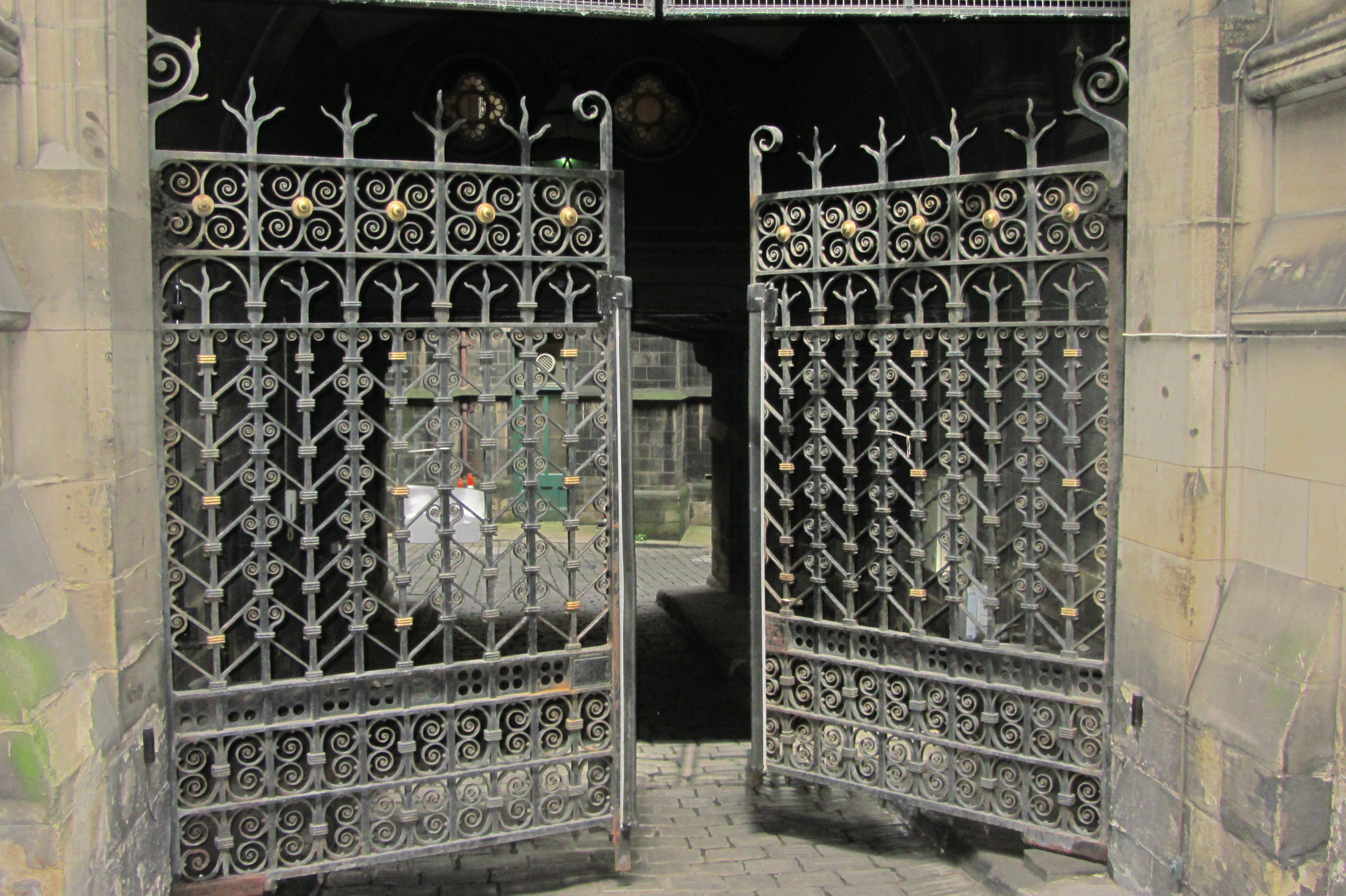
Wrought iron gates, Manchester Town Hall, located on Lloyd Street, they lead to the courtyard to the south of the Great Hall

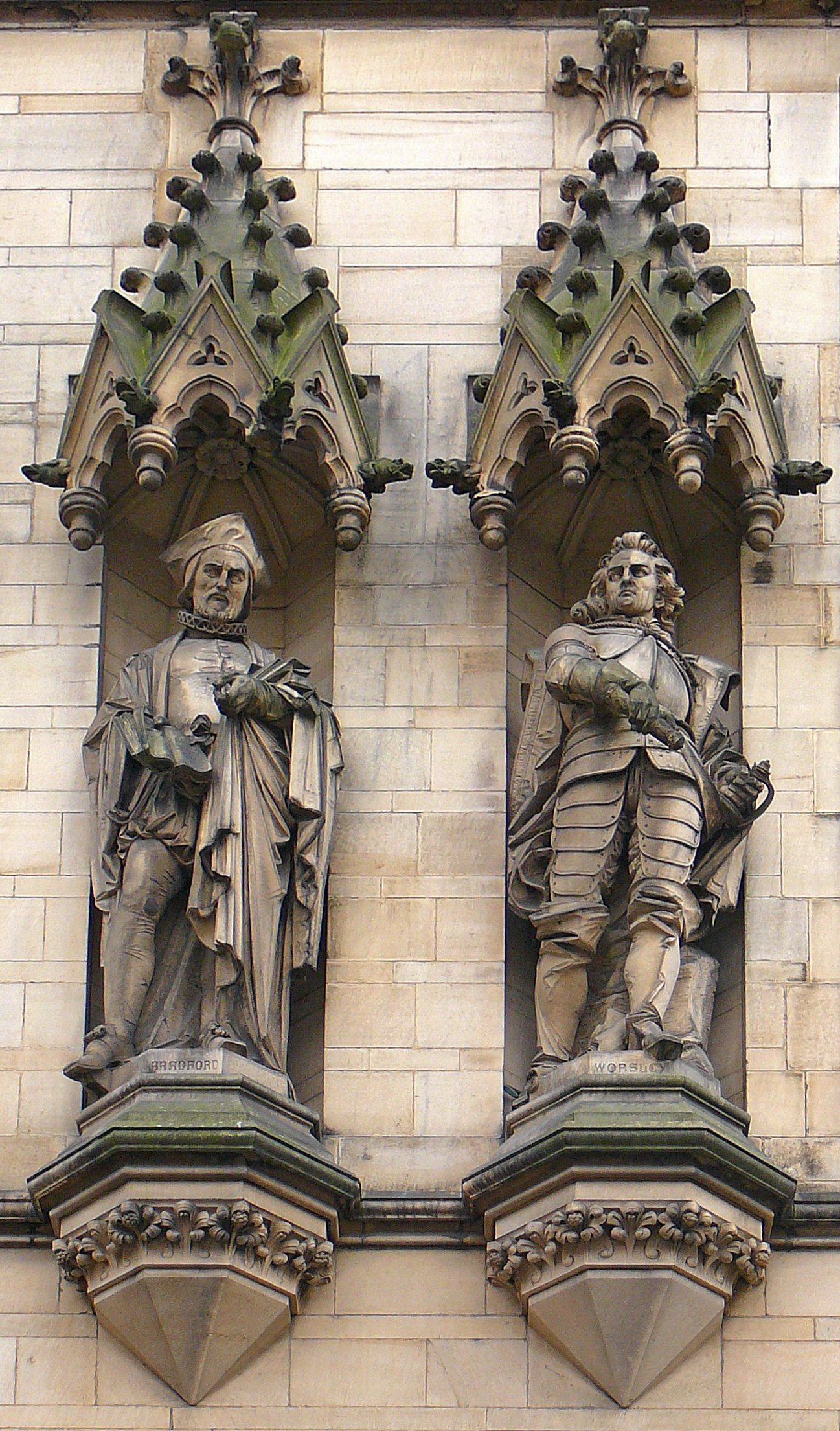
Stone sculptures of John Bradford on the left and Charles Worsley executed by Farmer & Brindley, on the main facade of Manchester Town Hall

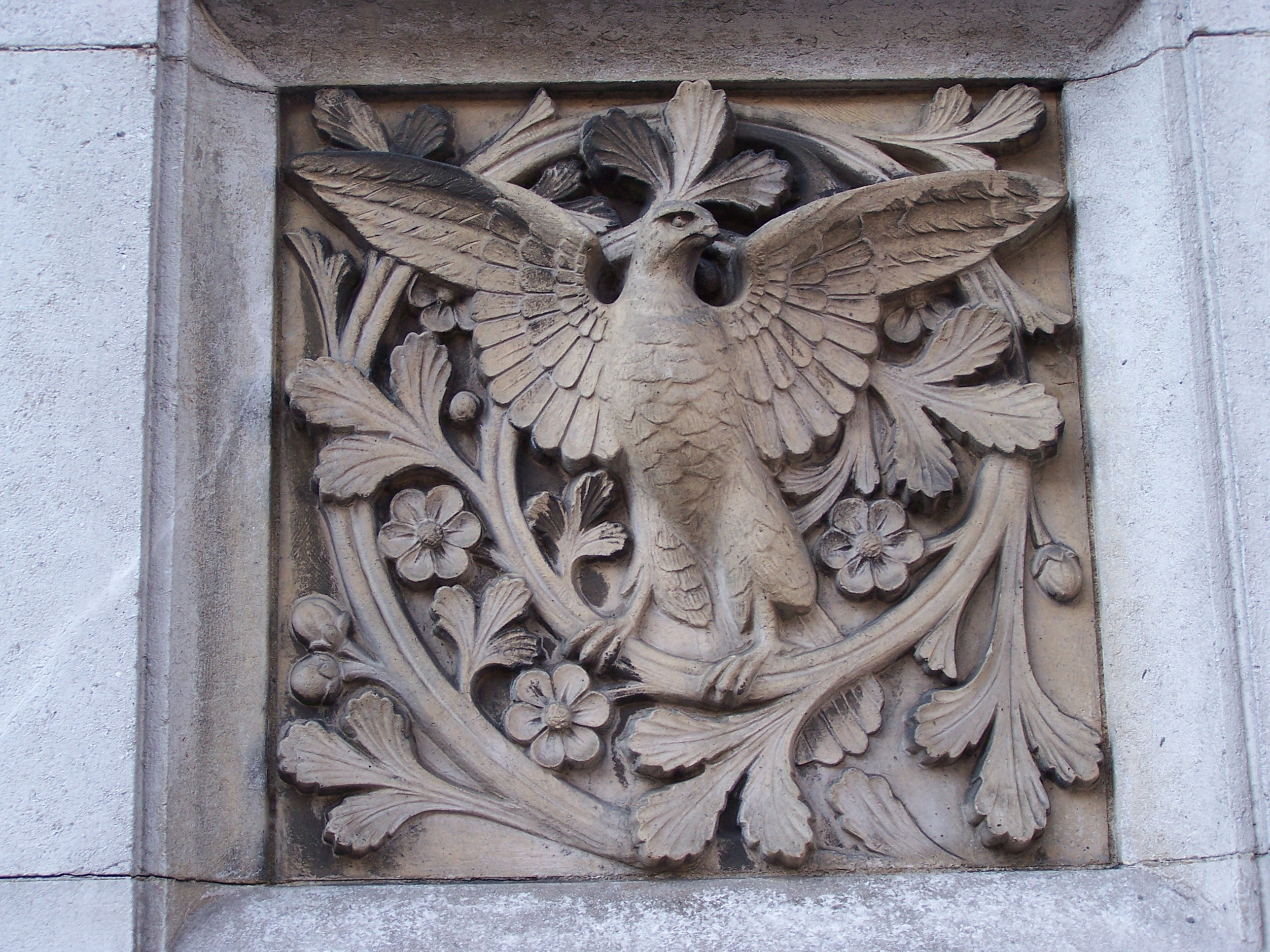
Terracotta sculpture of a hen harrier on a gate pier, Natural History Museum (1870)

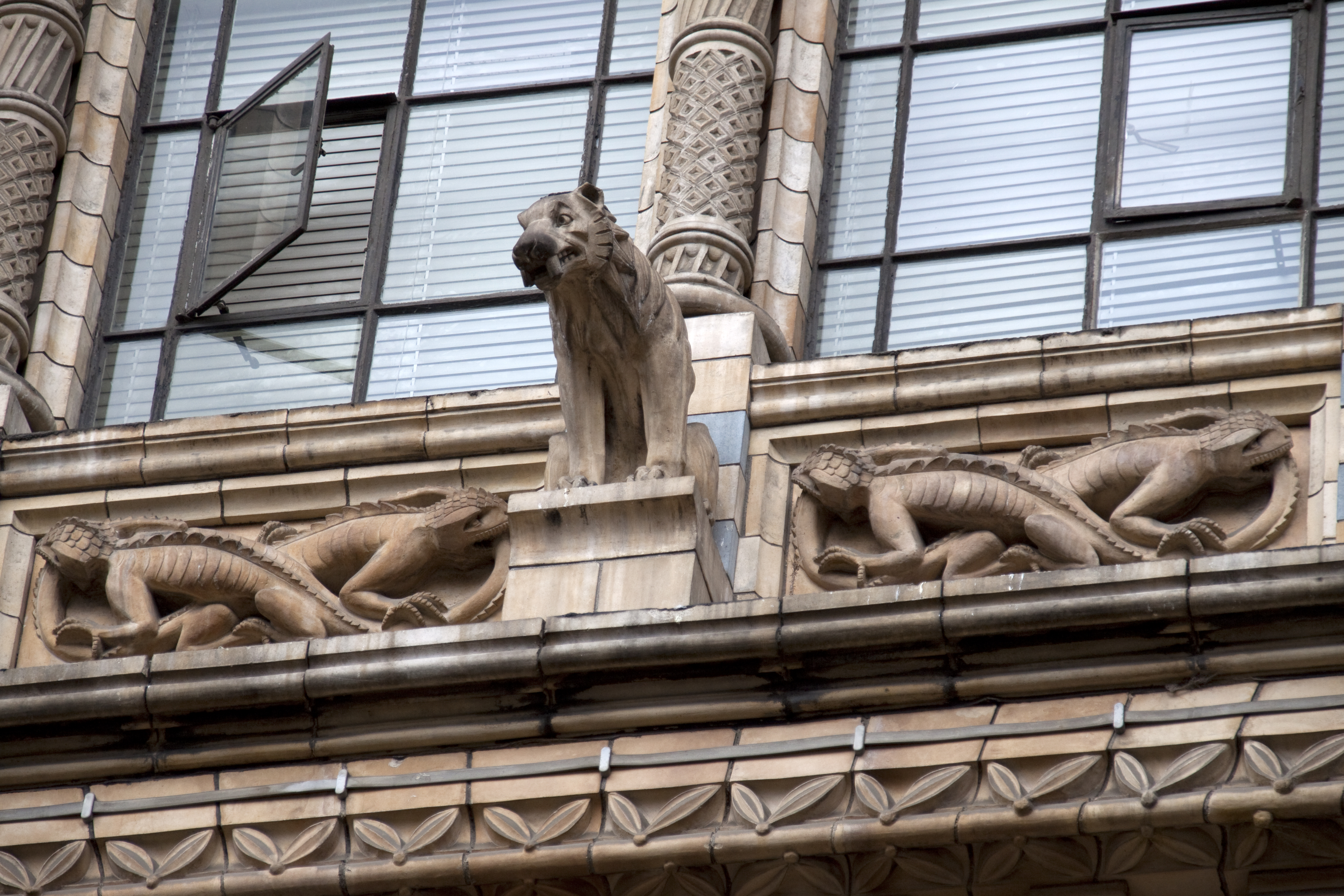
Terracotta sculptures of a Sabre-toothed tiger and lizards, below the second-floor windows of the east wing, Natural History Museum

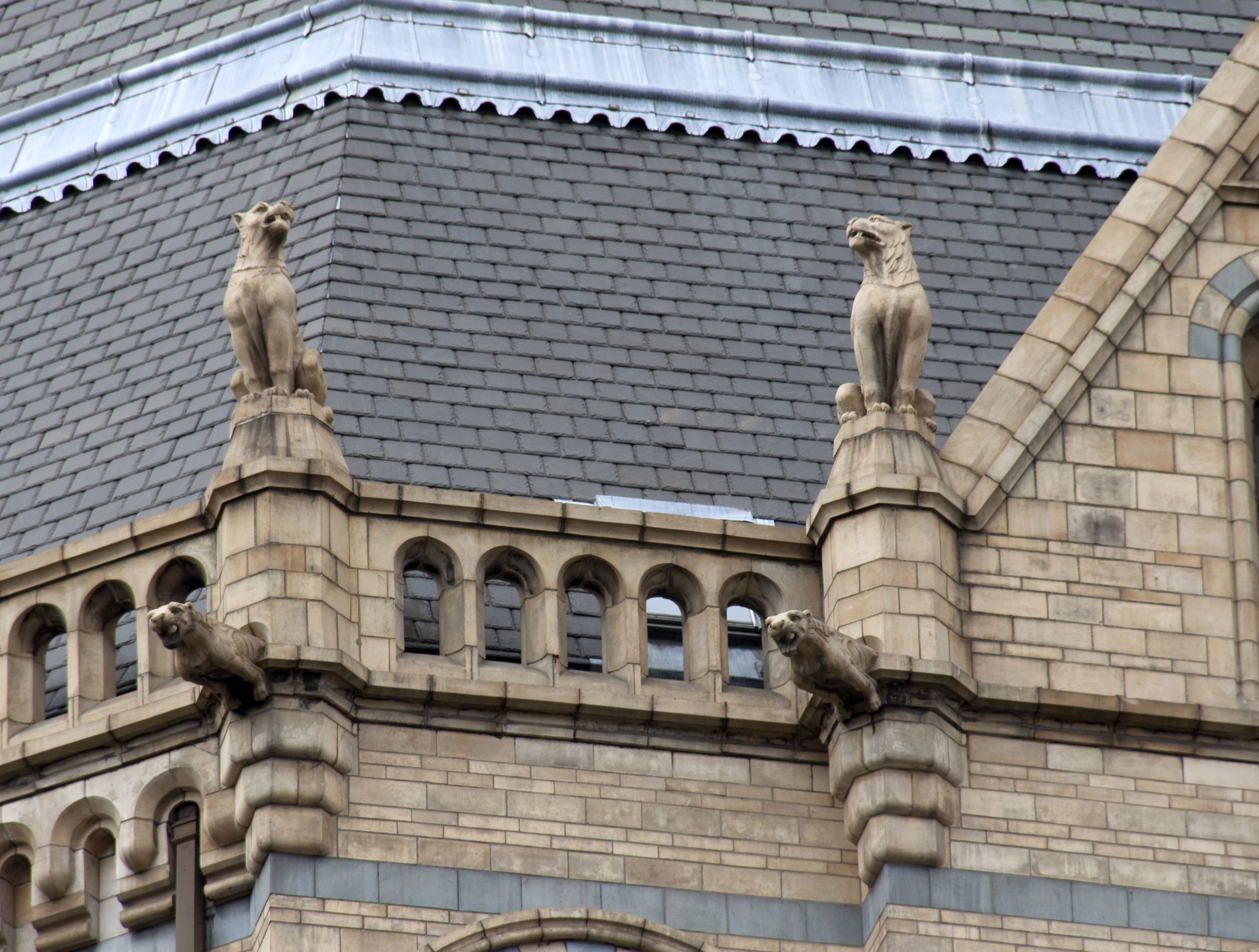
Terracotta lioness gargoyles and sculptures of sitting panthers on the western end tower, Natural History Museum

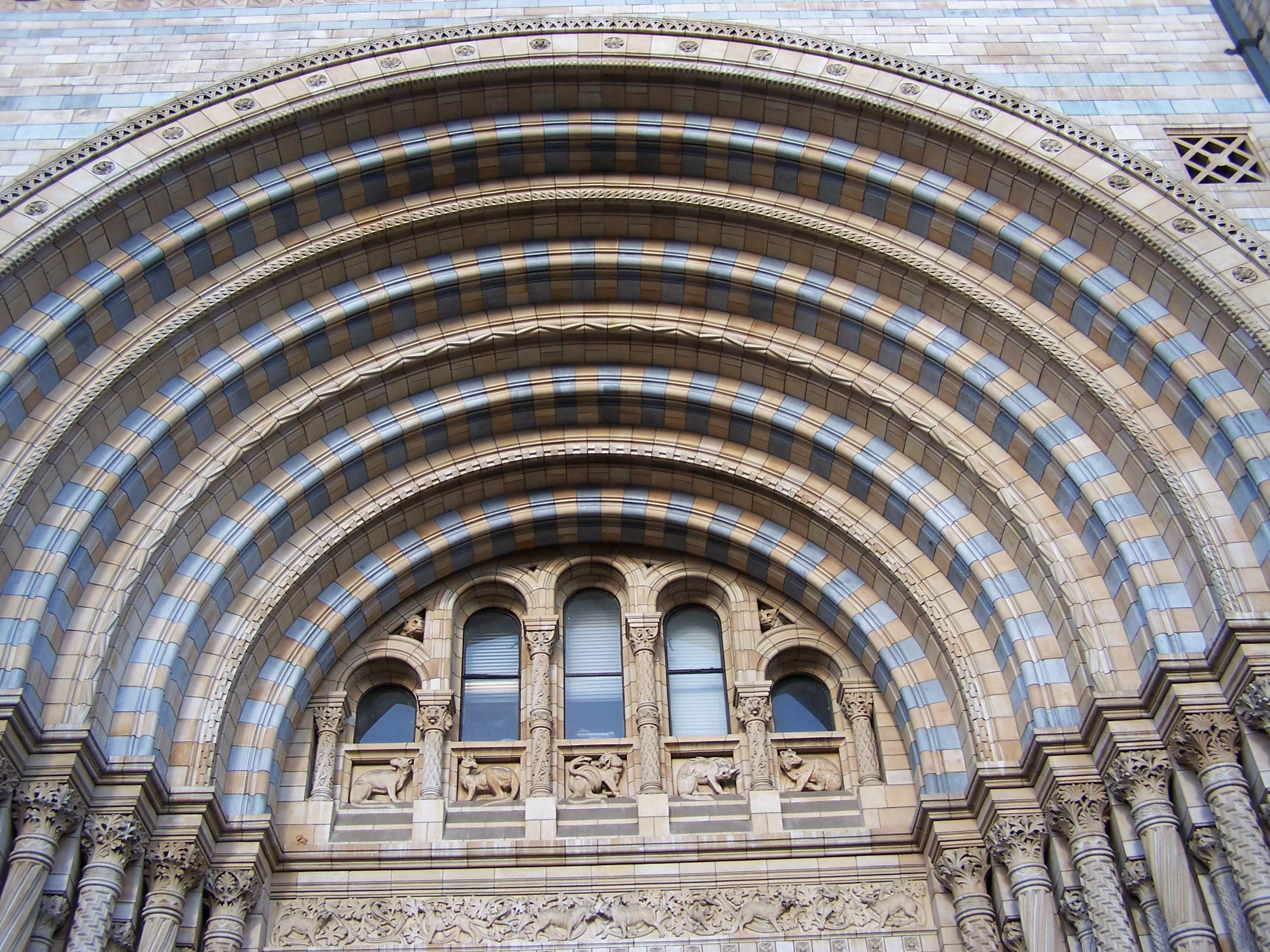
The series of arches above the main entrance, Natural History Museum, note the use of buff and blue-grey terracotta and sculptures, the main sculptures are: a jaguar; a kangaroo; a lioness being constricted by a snake; an American brown bear; a hyena.

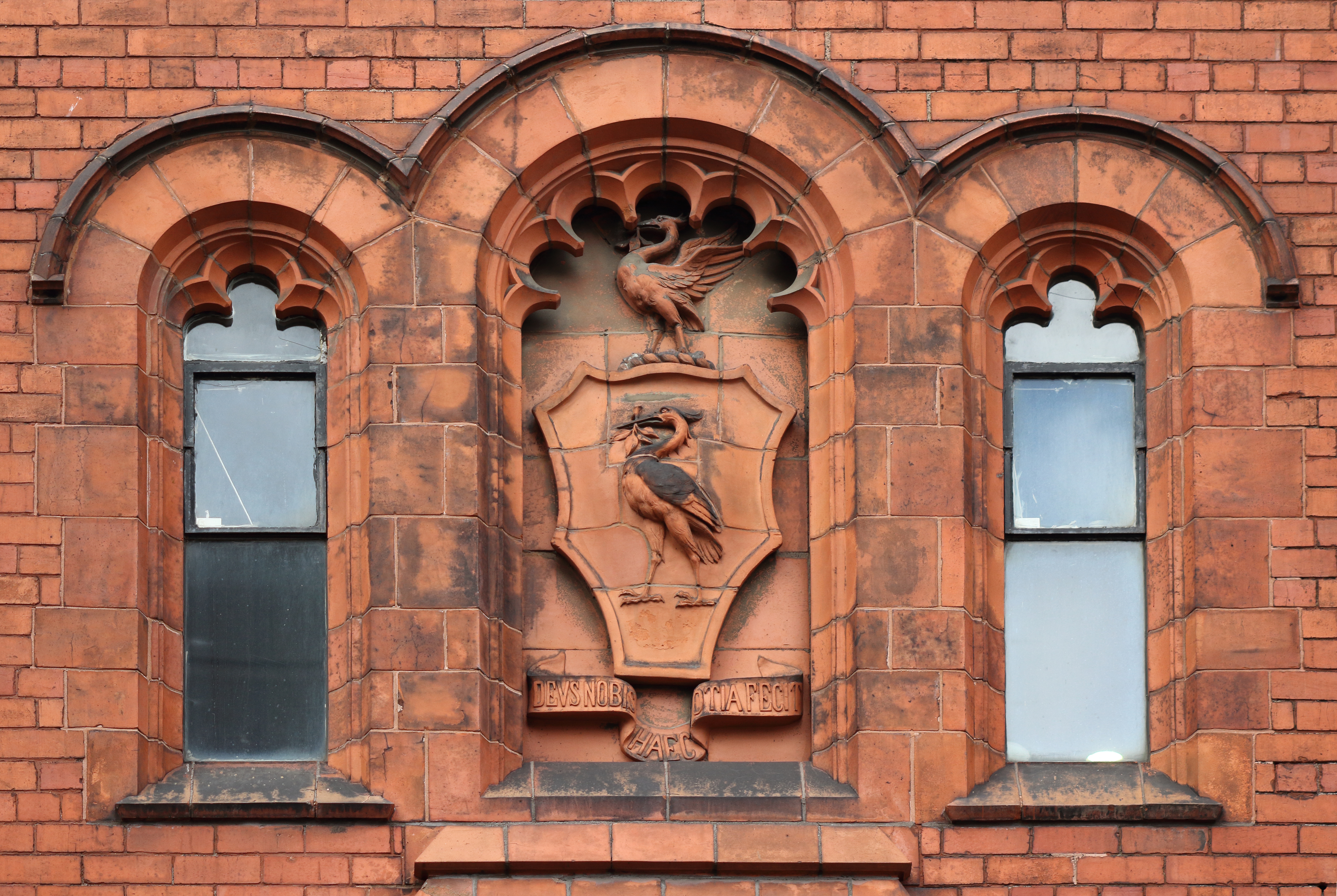
Terracotta coat of arms of the City of Liverpool, Victoria Building, University of Liverpool, located on the second floor above the main entrance

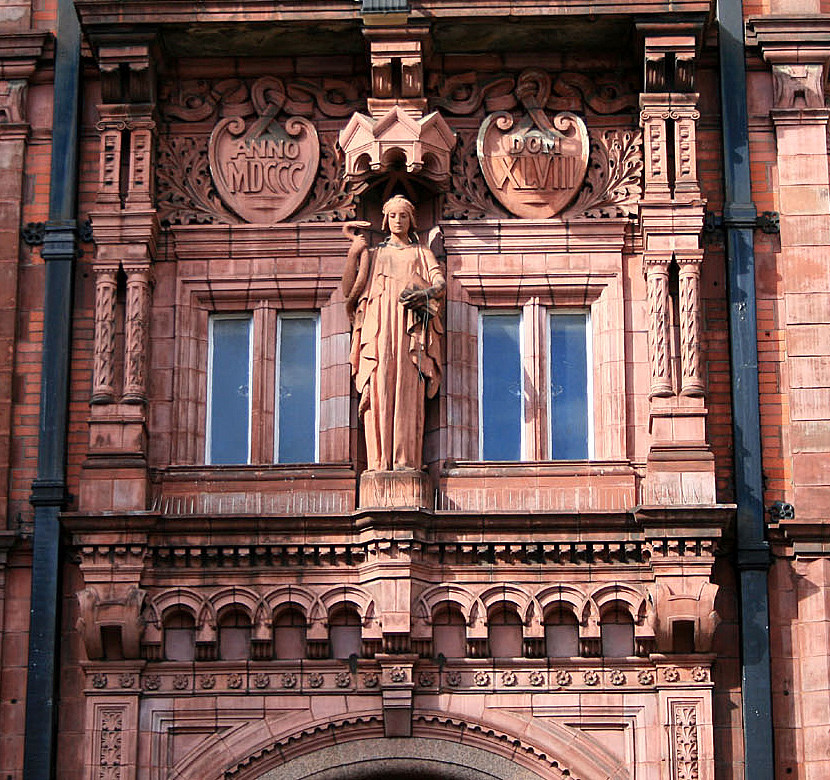
Terracotta sculpture and decoration above main entrance, with a statue of Prudence in the centre, Prudential Assurance Building, Nottingham

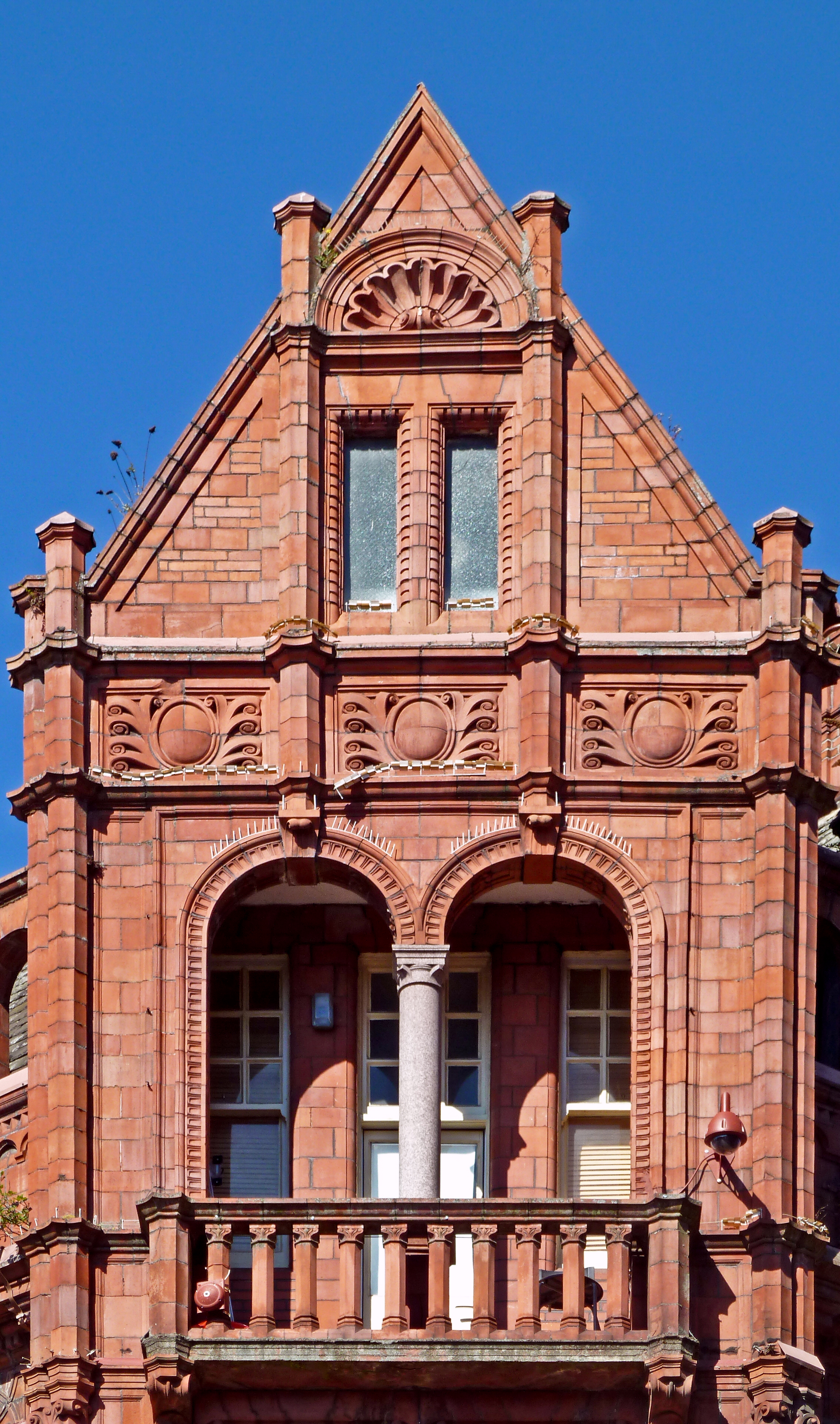
Corner gable of terracotta with granite column, Prudential Assurance Building, Bradford

==== Interior design, furniture and fittings ====
Waterhouse designed furniture but only for his own buildings, and only for a specific commission, ensuring stylistic harmony. His first known design being a desk in the 1850s for his father. Buildings that have Waterhouse designed furniture include Manchester Town Hall, both the grand rooms and the office areas; classroom desks at Reading Grammar School; office furniture for the Prudential Assurance offices and the National Liberal Club. He preferred simple sturdy designs for his furniture.

For eighteen of his buildings including Manchester Town Hall, he used the contractor Robert Pollitt to execute the painted decoration. Extensive correspondence survives between Waterhouse and Minton's and Maw's about patterns and colours that their tiles came in, both for floors and walls.

When it came to fireplaces Waterhouse usually designed them in timber, but in his grander buildings like Manchester Town Hall and Eaton Hall he used stone and marble. The most important have elaborate carved decoration. He also often designed fireplace mantels. Often there is a hierarchy of design, in his Refuge Assurance Building in Manchester, for instance, polished stone and timber in the boardroom, faience in the public offices and simpler designs for the managers and clerks offices. The Manchester Town Hall fireplaces contain tiling in the fireplace, some with medieval designs, others classical designs, Turkish designs and Japanese in the Mayor's Suite.

Staircase balustrades in his domestic work were usually either timber or iron often with elaborate designs, he preferred iron, faience or stone in his public buildings. He also designed light fittings such as the large gasoliers in the Great Hall at Manchester Town Hall. He designed grilles and screens such as those on his staircase at Balliol College, Oxford. Floors of terrazzo or mosaic are common in circulation spaces of his public buildings. His early ceiling designs tended to have ceiling roses by J.W. Hindshaw, usually of bold geometric design. Later he tended to pattern the whole ceiling with simple ribs. Rarely did he design painted ceilings, Manchester Town Hall, Eaton Hall and the Main and North halls at the Natural History Museum, being exceptions. Waterhouse had this to say in his 1891 Presidential address at the RIBA about stained glass:

Of all the stained glass with which the churches of this country have been flooded within the last half century, there is not one bit in a hundred that could not in my opinion, be very easily spared. In the majority the drawing is bad, the sentiment is mawkish, and the colour, which is the real excuse for shutting out the cheerful light of day, is the worst thing about these stained glass windows; and yet they are there for all time, unless conflagrations, or another revolution conducted like our first by iconoclasts, intervene to rid us of them.

In domestic and public buildings he preferred glass in muted greys and pinks of simple geometric patterns, he rarely uses heraldic or narrative designs, Eaton Hall was an exception with the Arthurian Scenes. When he used figured glass he would turn to designers like Heaton, Butler and Bayne, or his friend Frederic Shield, who designed windows at Eaton Hall Chapel, for the restoration of St Ann's Church, Manchester, the chapel at Coodham in Scotland and St Elizabeth's Reddish. Waterhouse took interior design seriously, liking to control the overall look, this is why he liked using faience, in his 1890 presidential address at the RIBA he had this to say:

It enables the architect to insure that his more important apartments remain as he designed them. Most of us have been occasionally disconcerted in discovering that some interior which depended greatly on its harmony of colour, and which we may have thought more or less a success when it left our hands, had been handed over when in need of repainting to the tender mercies of some decorator, who failing to appreciate the delicate scheme of colour upon which we had prided ourselves.....had sown discord and vulgarity broadcast over our creation

===== Gallery of internal decorative elements in Waterhouse's buildings, showing different styles, materials, techniques and designs =====
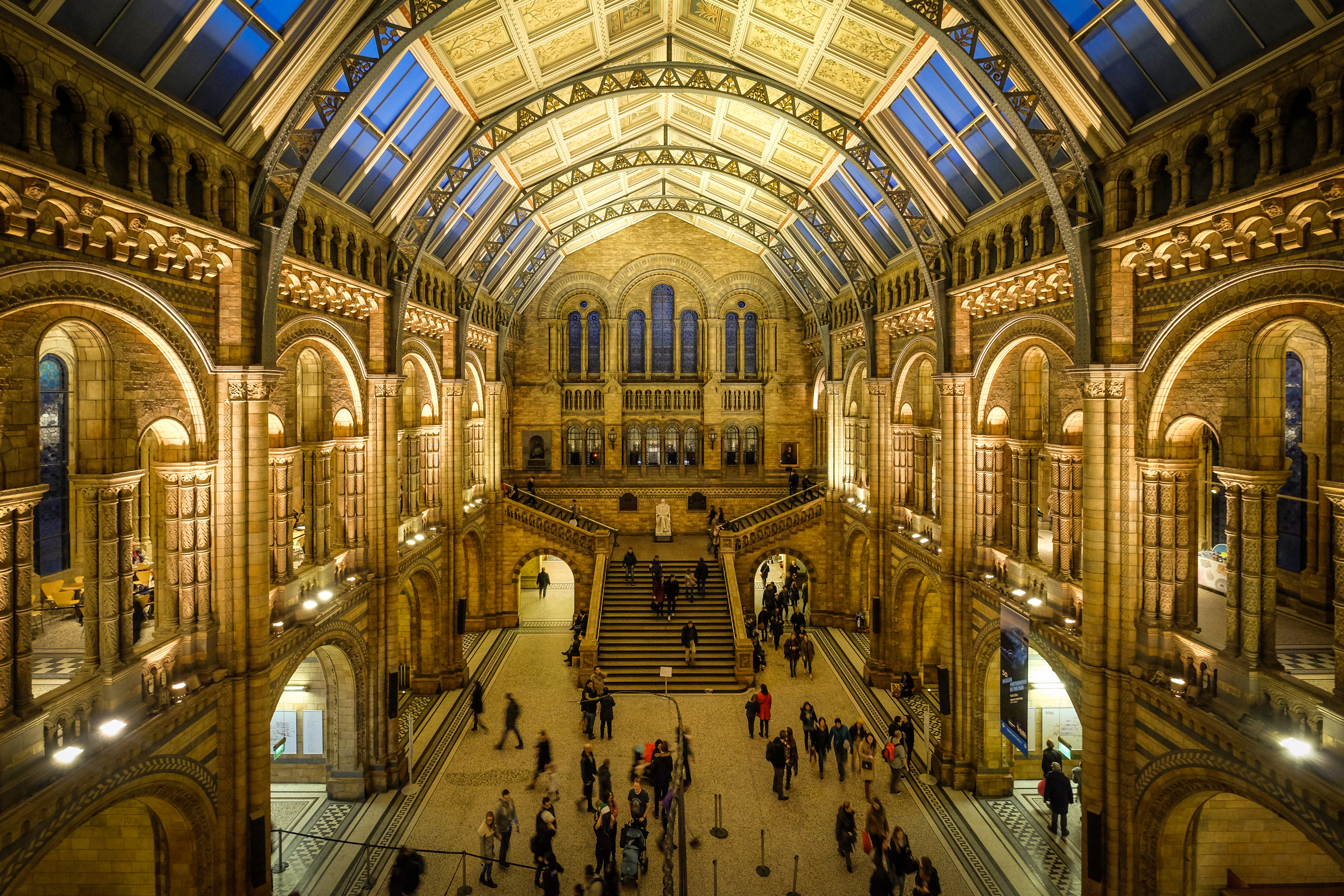
The Main Hall, The Natural History Museum, note the cast-iron roof trusses, with the ceiling panels painted with plants from across the World, the skylights are the main source of light and the imperial staircase rises to the first floor on the end wall, the hall has aisles and on the floor above galleries, as in the nave of a Romanesque cathedral

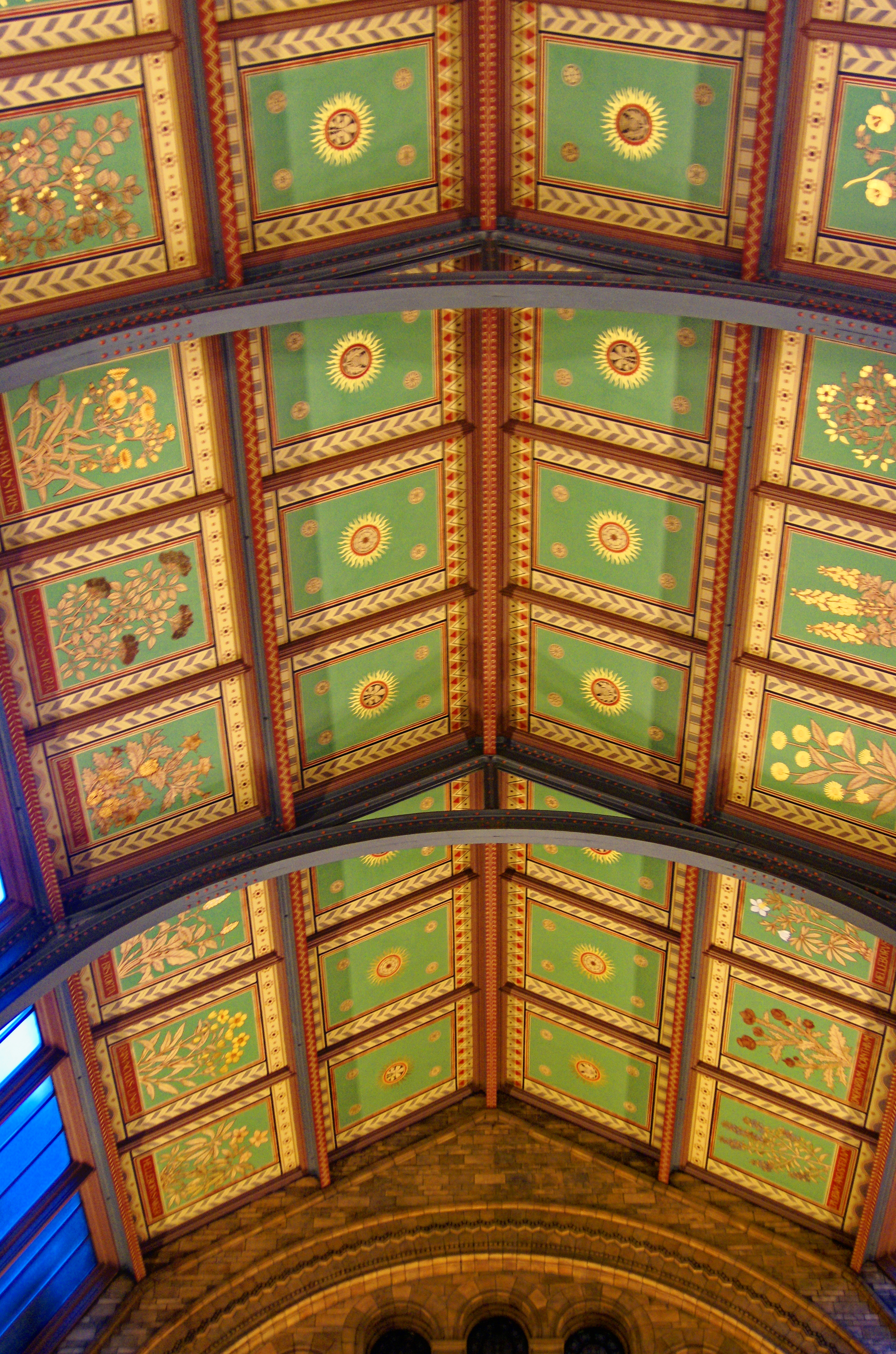
The painted ceiling, North Hall, Natural History Museum c.1881, designed by Waterhouse, painted by Charles James Lea of the firm of Best & Lea, depicting native British plants, subdued colour palette with subtle gilded highlights is used, note the unobtrusive cast-iron roof trusses, very different from his wooden roofs

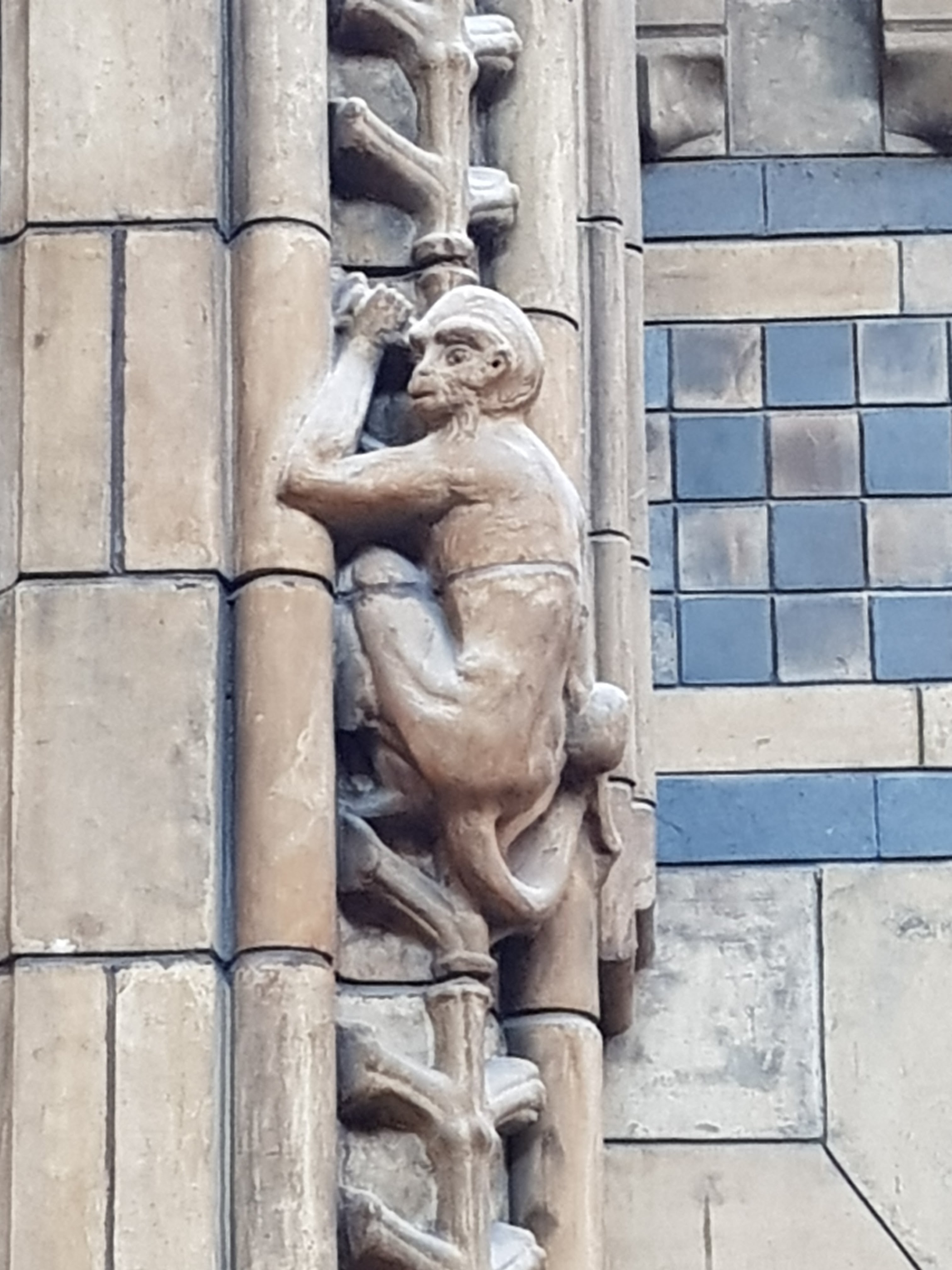
Terracotta monkey, one of several in the Main Hall, Natural History Museum

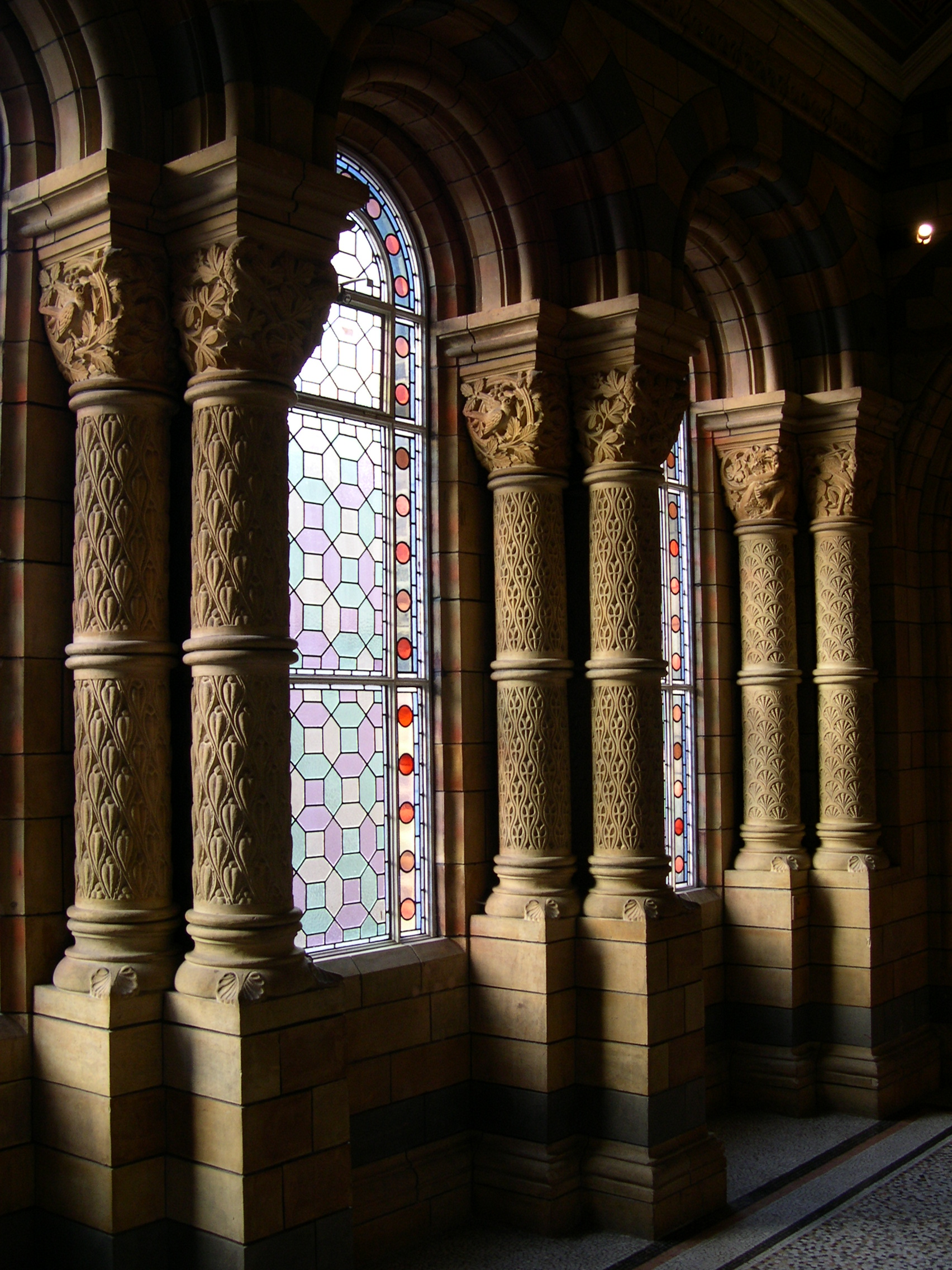
Windows behind the main staircase, The Natural History Museum, Romanesque round windows, note the colonettes with their carved capitals and elaborately decorated shafts, also typical Waterhouse window glass in geometric patterns and shades of pink and blue

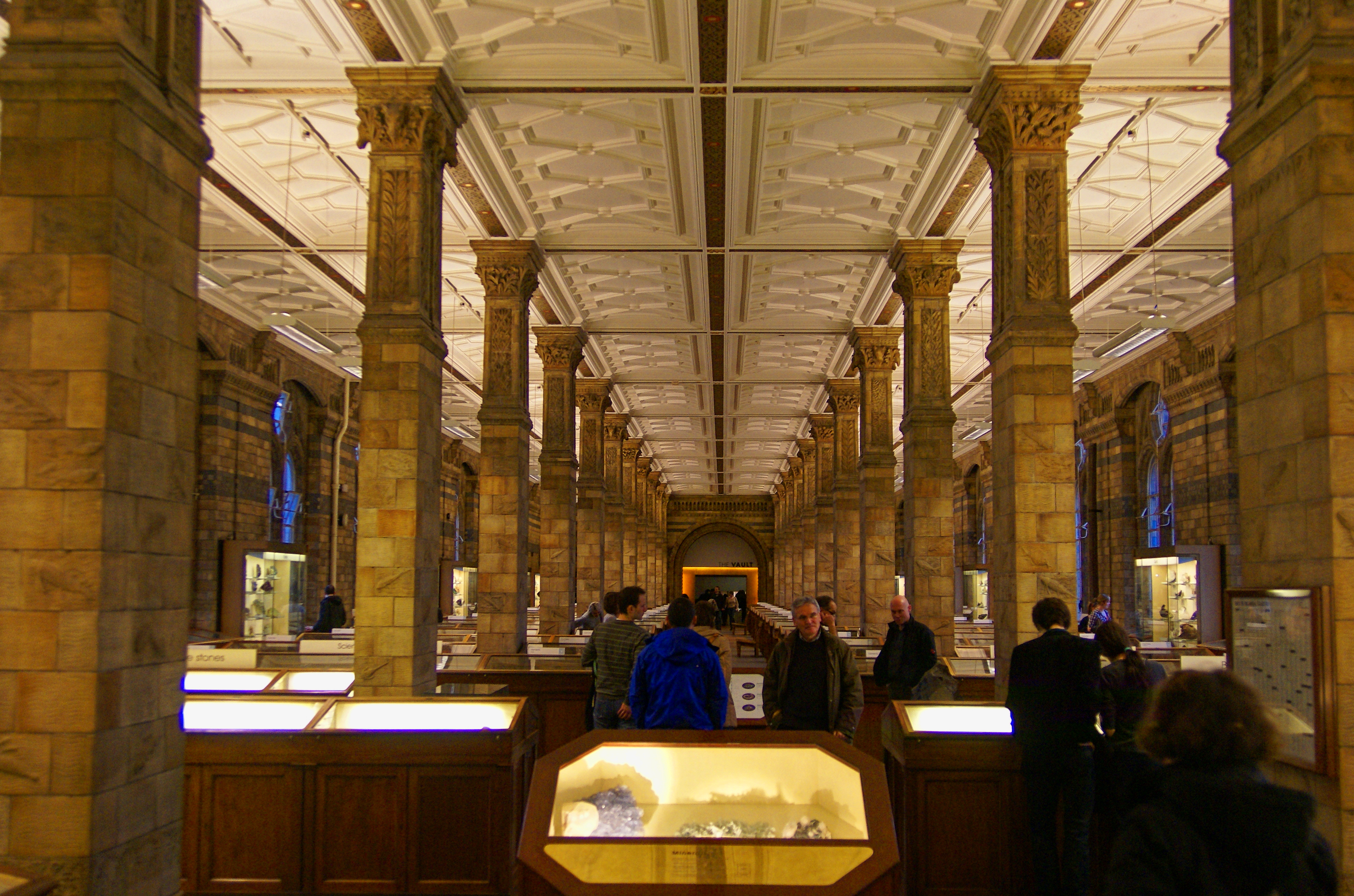
The first floor gallery in the east wing at the front of The Natural History Museum, with a typical Waterhouse white ceiling with geometrical patterning contrasting with the terracotta walls and columns, each column has a core of iron, supporting concrete vaults hidden by the ceiling, part of the fireproofing of the building

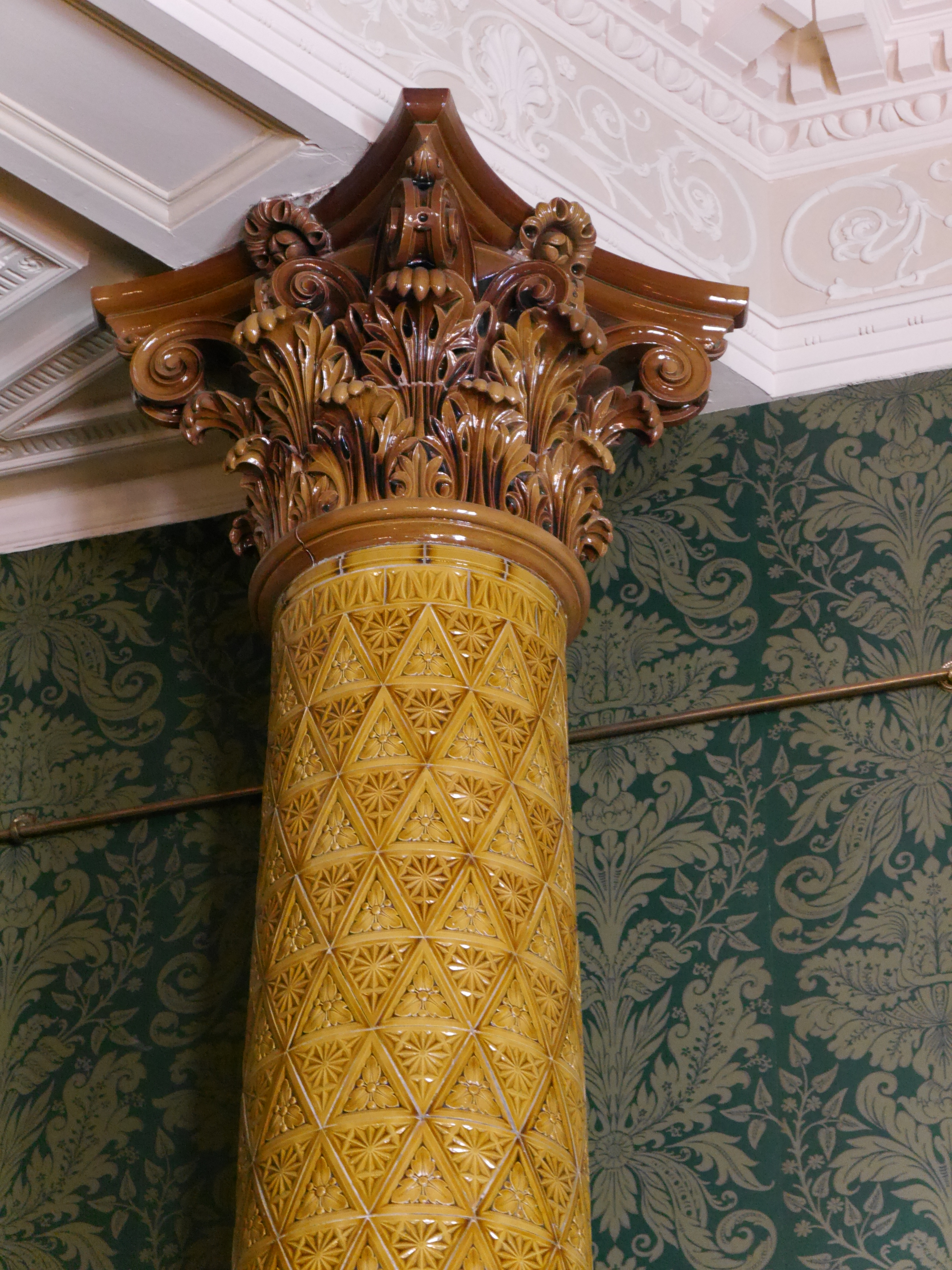
Detail of one of the faience clad classical Corinthian columns in the current Smoking Room formerly the Writing Room, National Liberal Club, note the darker colour of the capital almost brown compared with the yellow of the shaft, also visible is the plasterwork cornice

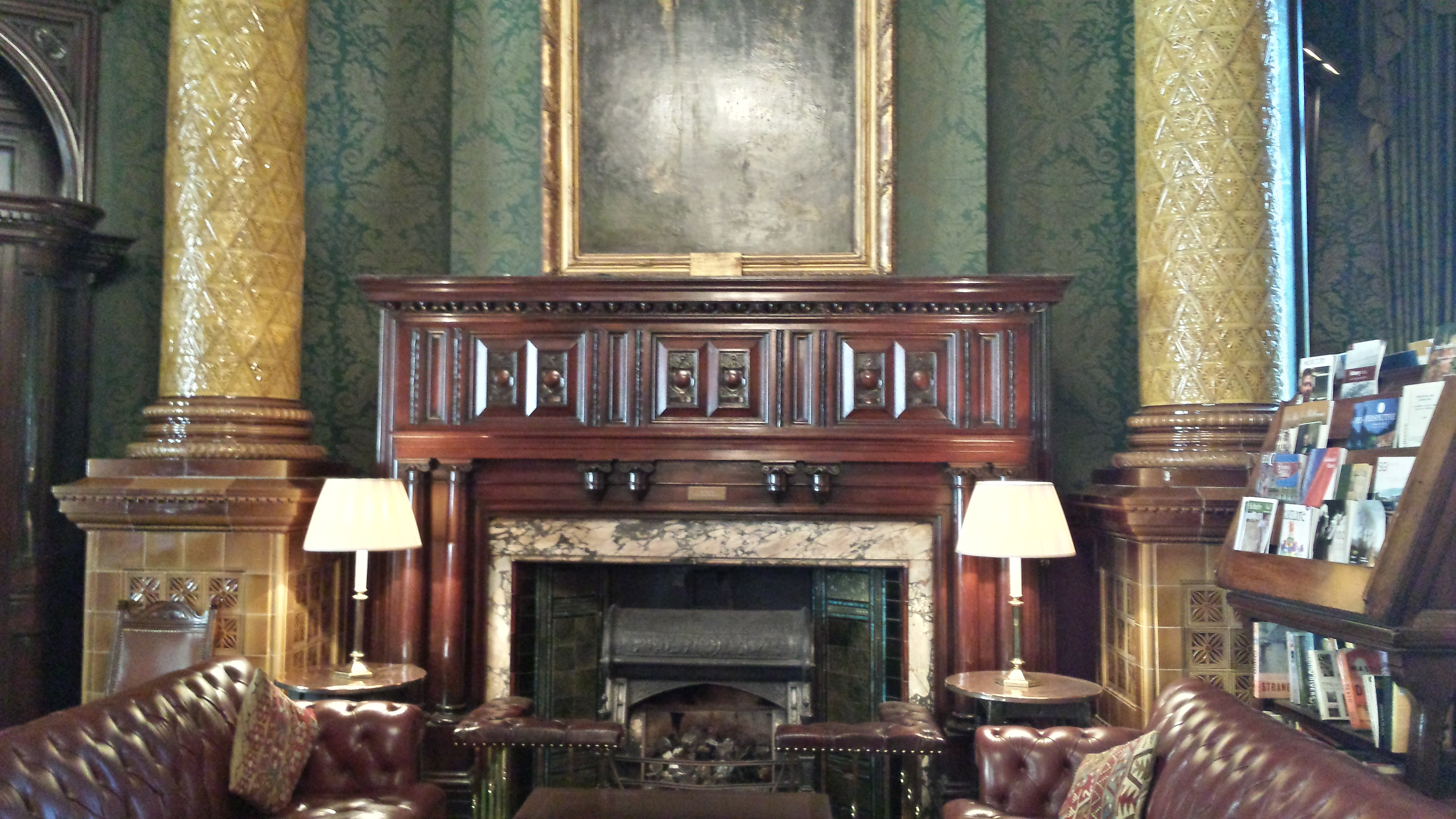
Fireplace in the current Smoking Room, National Liberal Club, note wooden mantle enclosing marble fire-surround, with dark tiles within the fireplace

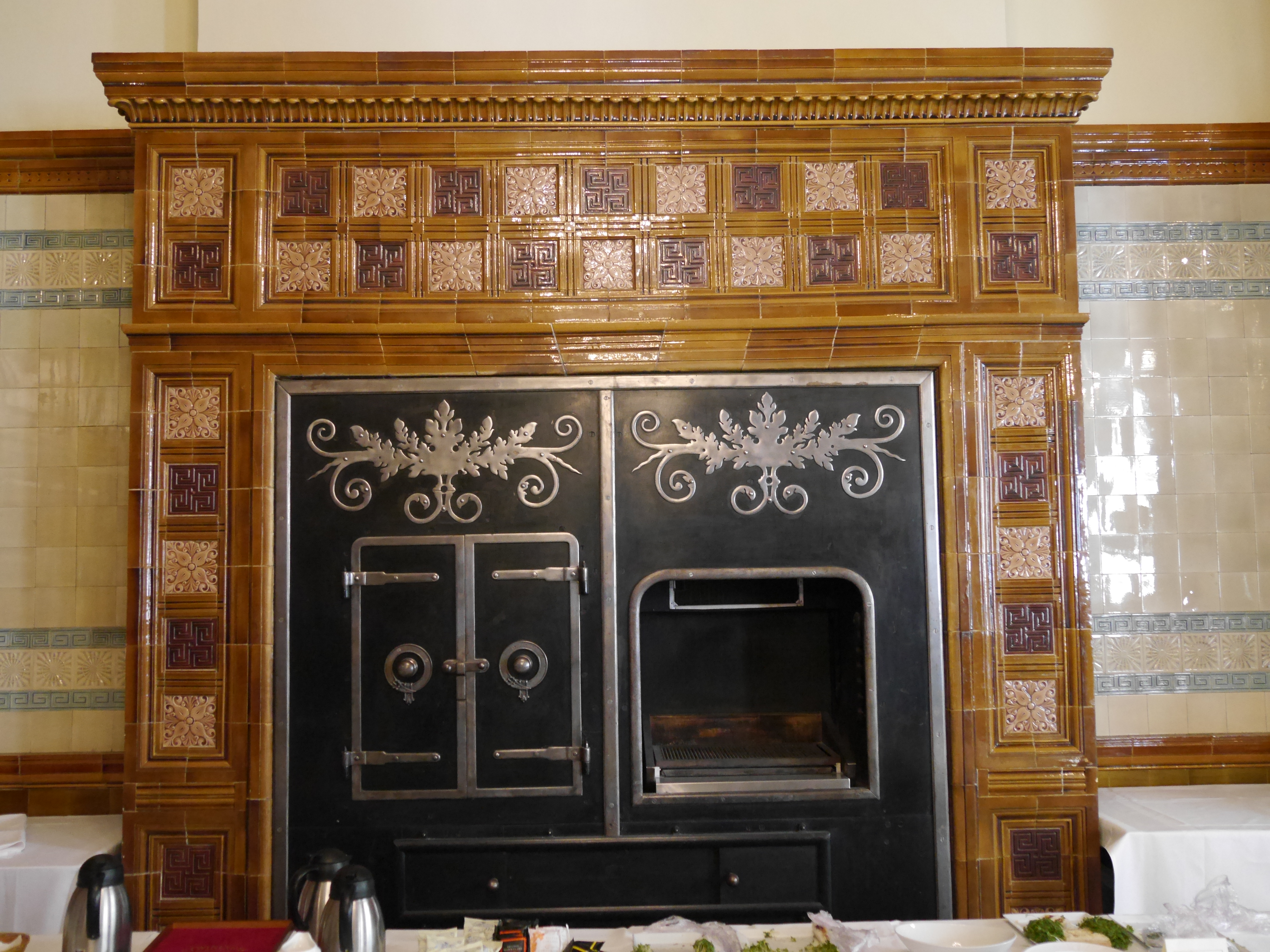
Classical style faience oven surround and tall dado, in the former Grill Room (now called the David Lloyd George Room), National Liberal Club, showing Waterhouse's use of colour in the faience and the simple design of the metalwork on the oven and grill

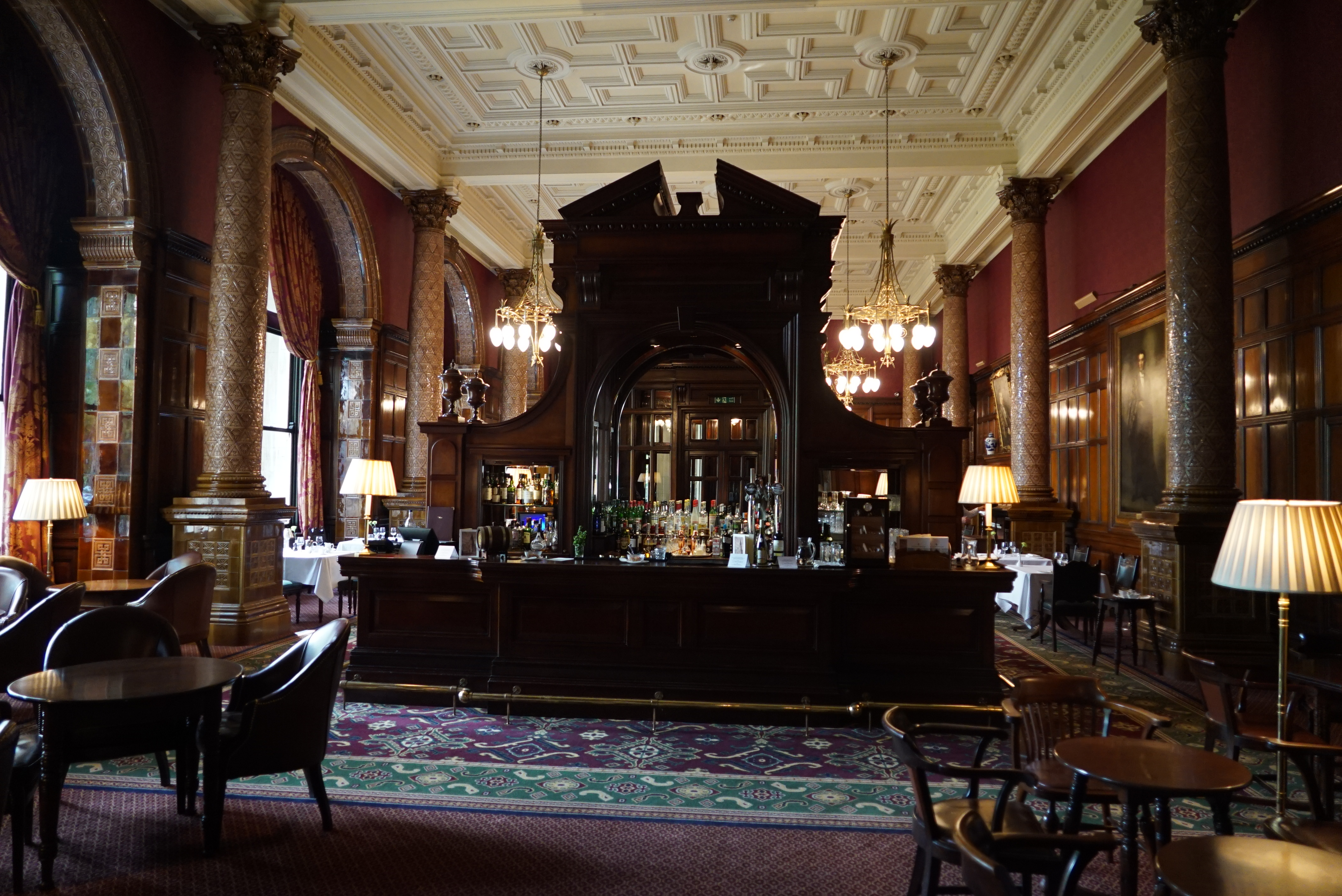
The classical style bar in the dining room, National Liberal Club, London (1884–87), an example of Waterhouse's furnishings, made of solid mahogany, note the geometrical patterns of the ribs in the plasterwork ceiling and the pendant light fittings

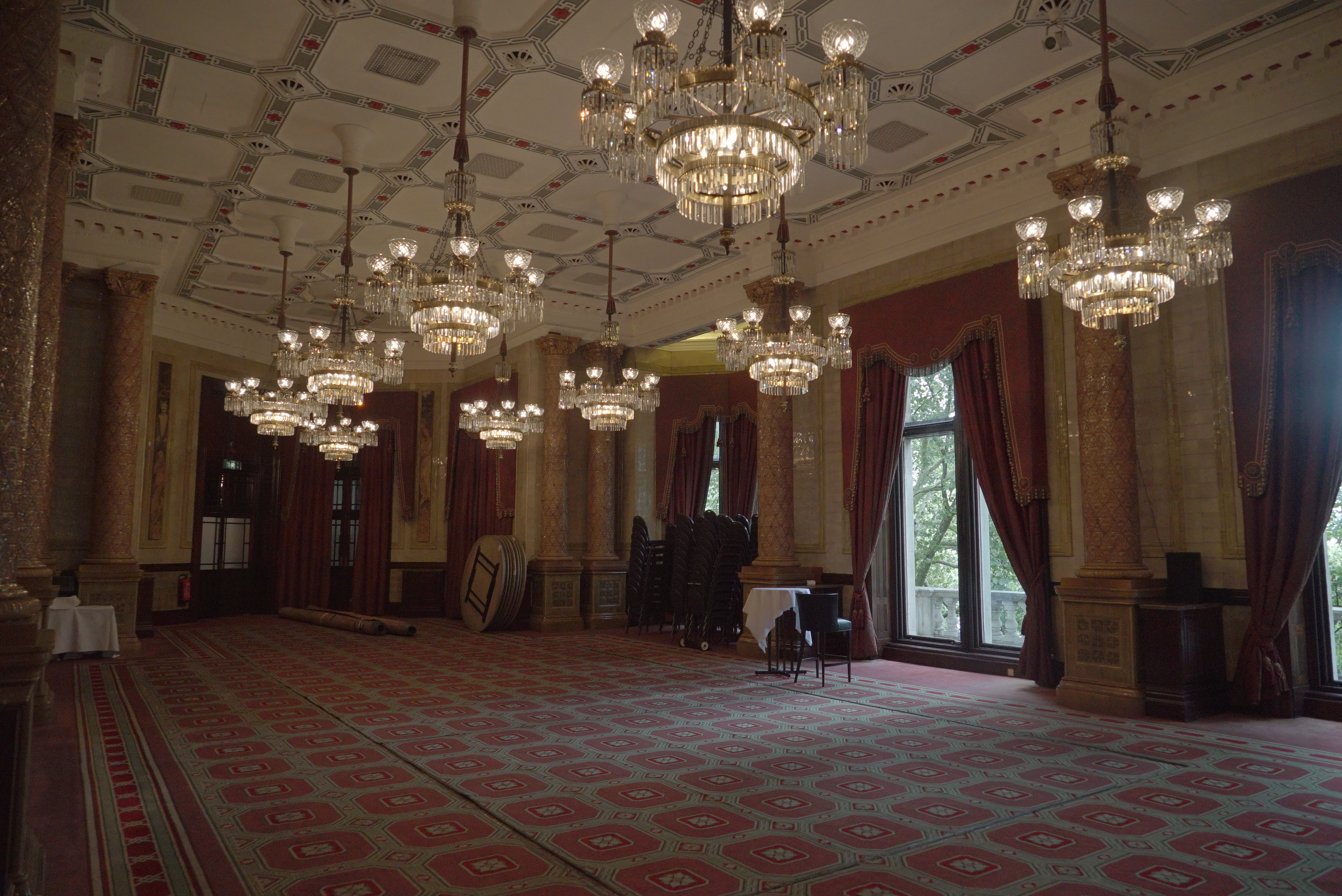
The former Reading Room, The National Liberal Club, this is on the first floor and served the Gladstone Library accessible through the end door on the left, the door on the right leads to the secondary staircase that links all floors in the building, note the vents in the ceiling for the mechanical ventilation system, the walls as well as the columns are clad in faience, the light fittings are not the originals

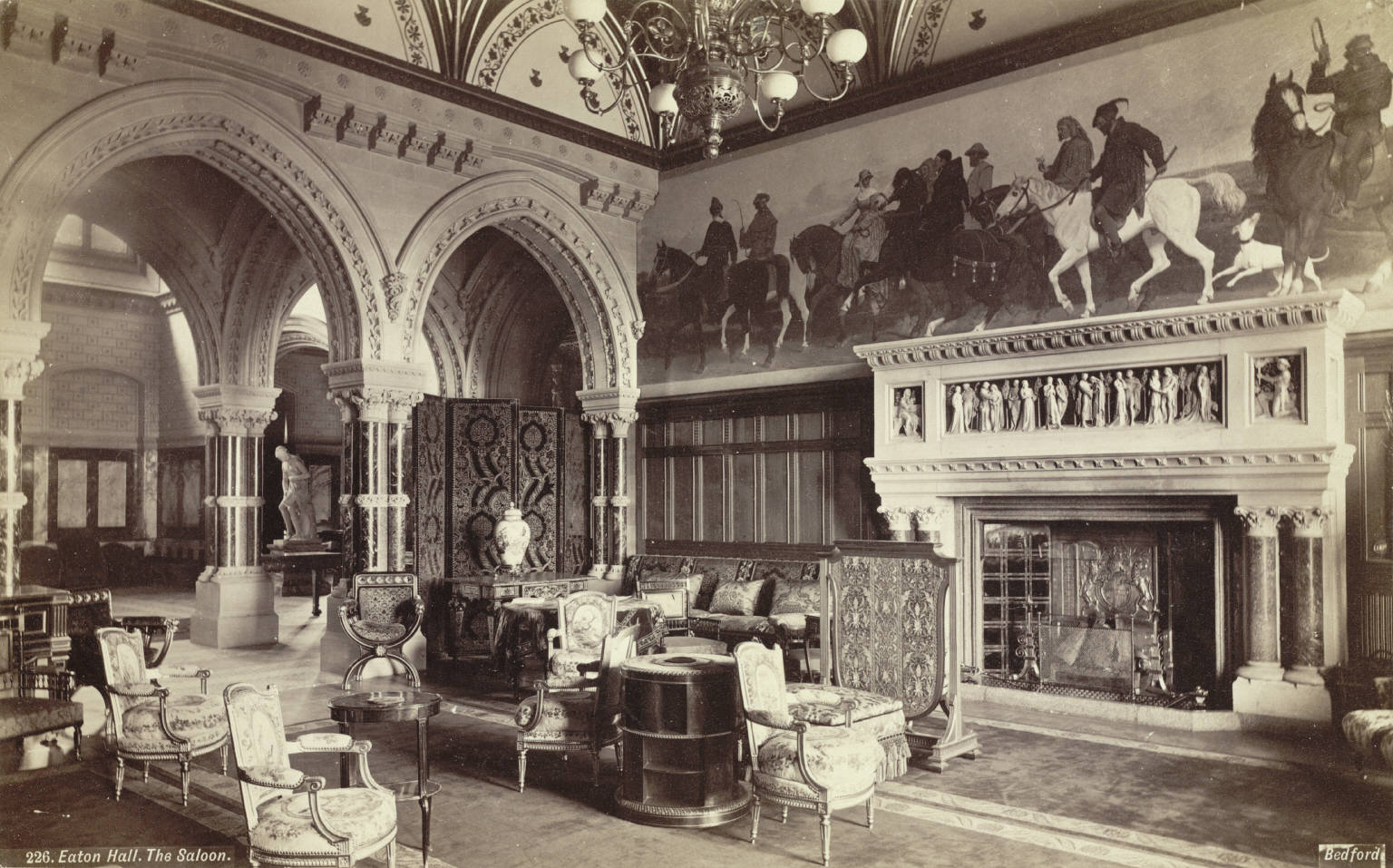
The Saloon, Eaton hall (c.1883 destroyed c.1962), note the Henry Stacy Marks murals of the Pilgrims from The Canterbury Tales, the elaborately carved marble fireplace, columns and arches, the rows of columns and arches delineate the corridor passing through the building, beyond which is the Entrance Hall with its elaborate mosaic floor.

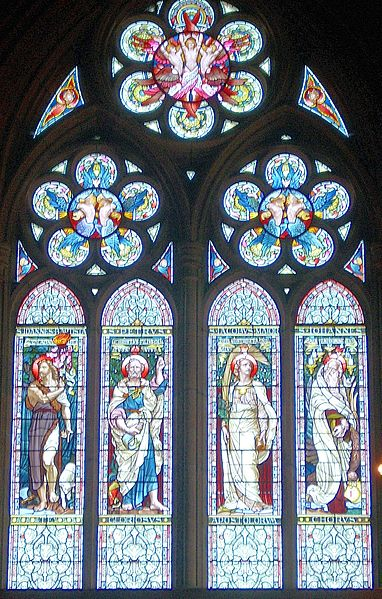
The east window, Eaton Hall Chapel, designed by Frederic Shields (the altar unusually is at the west end), this shows the stained-glass of light colours that allow plenty of light through that Waterhouse liked, also his use of geometrical window tracery. The main figures depicted are John the Baptist, Saint Peter, James the Great and John the Apostle

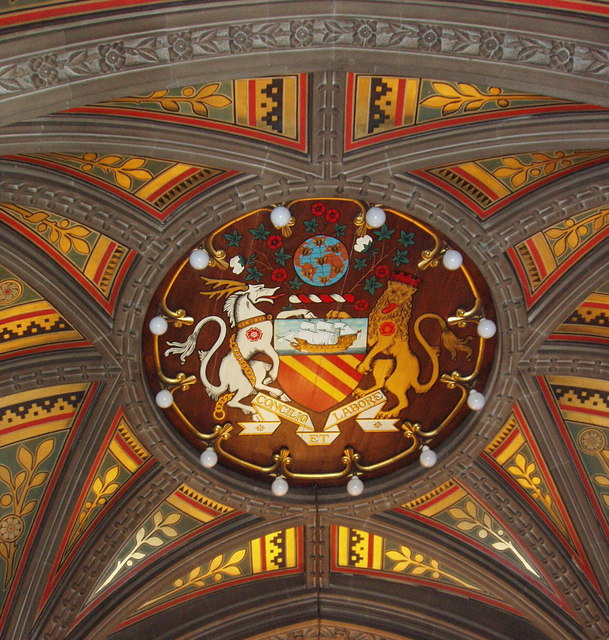
Painted coat of arms of Manchester on the vestibule lierne vault beneath the main tower, Manchester Town Hall, the work of Robert Pollitt

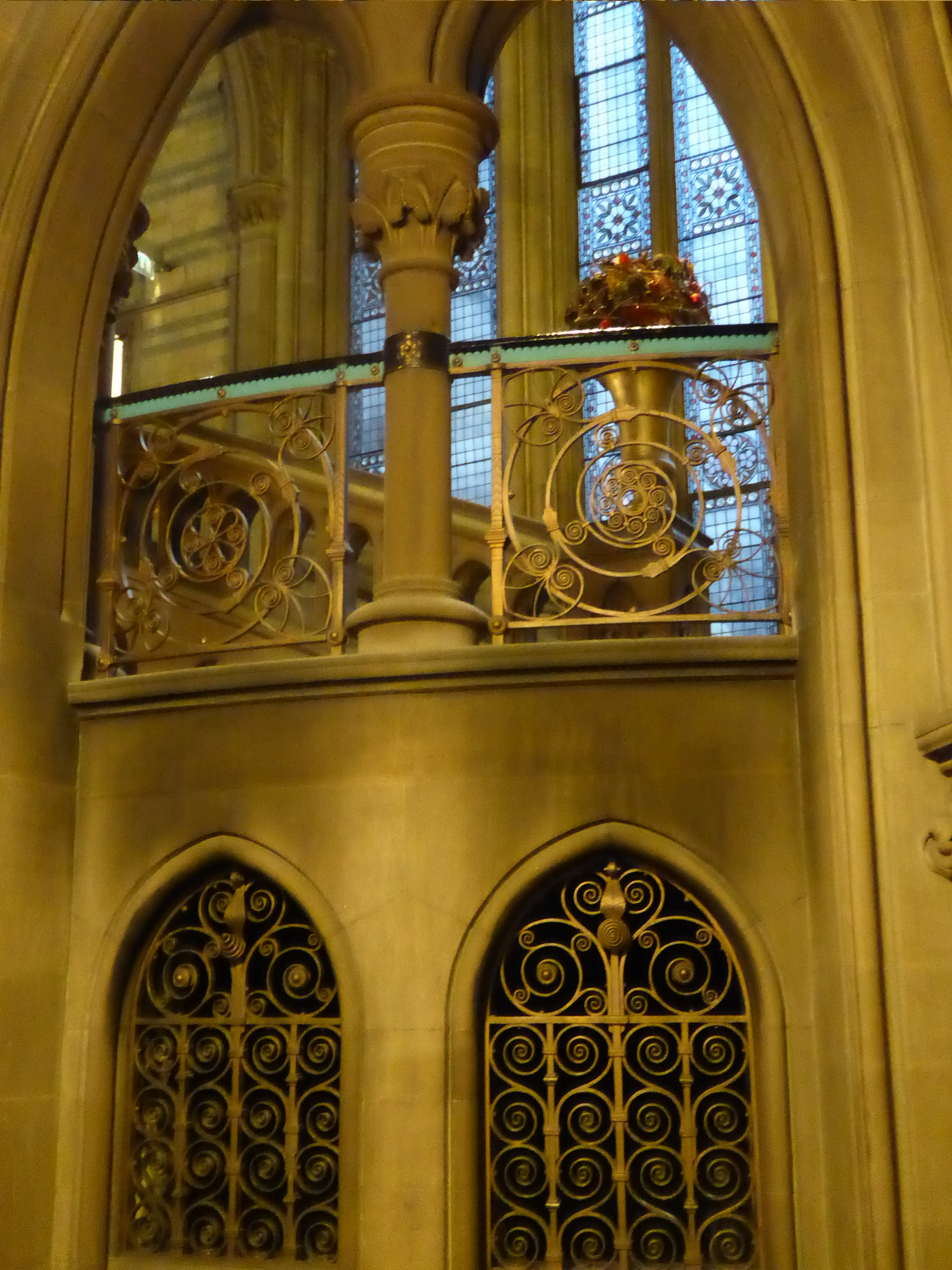
Gothic style ironwork, on the lower flight of the Main Staircase, Manchester Town Hall, with typical Waterhouse glass in the background

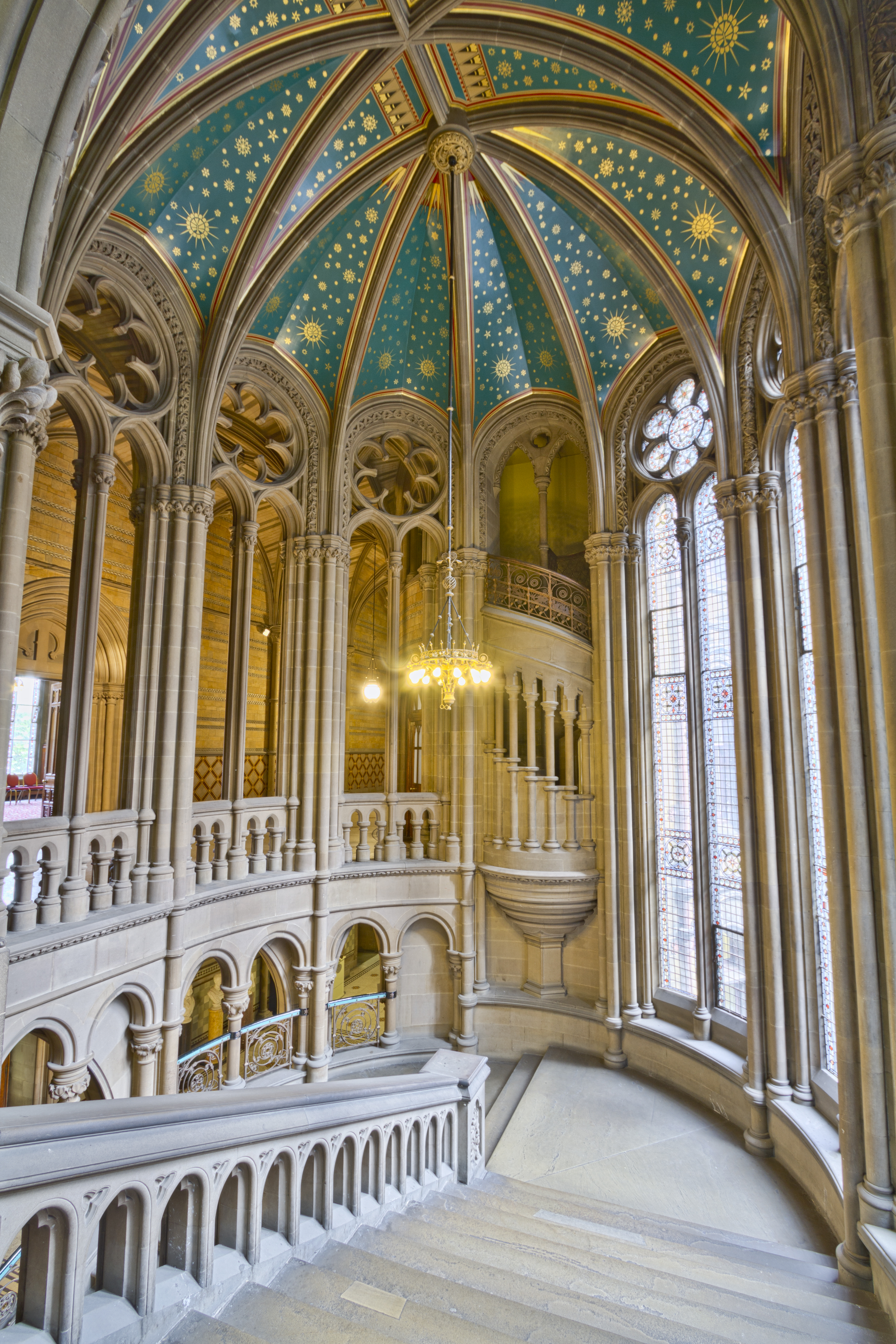
The principal staircase, Manchester Town Hall, with a spiral staircase projecting into it and typical Waterhouse glass and a painted ceiling of a blue sky with golden stars and suns on the vault. The staircase has stone steps and balustrade, the columns on the left allow natural light to flood into the corridor off which the major rooms of the building open, this is one of the most spatial complex designs of Waterhouse's career

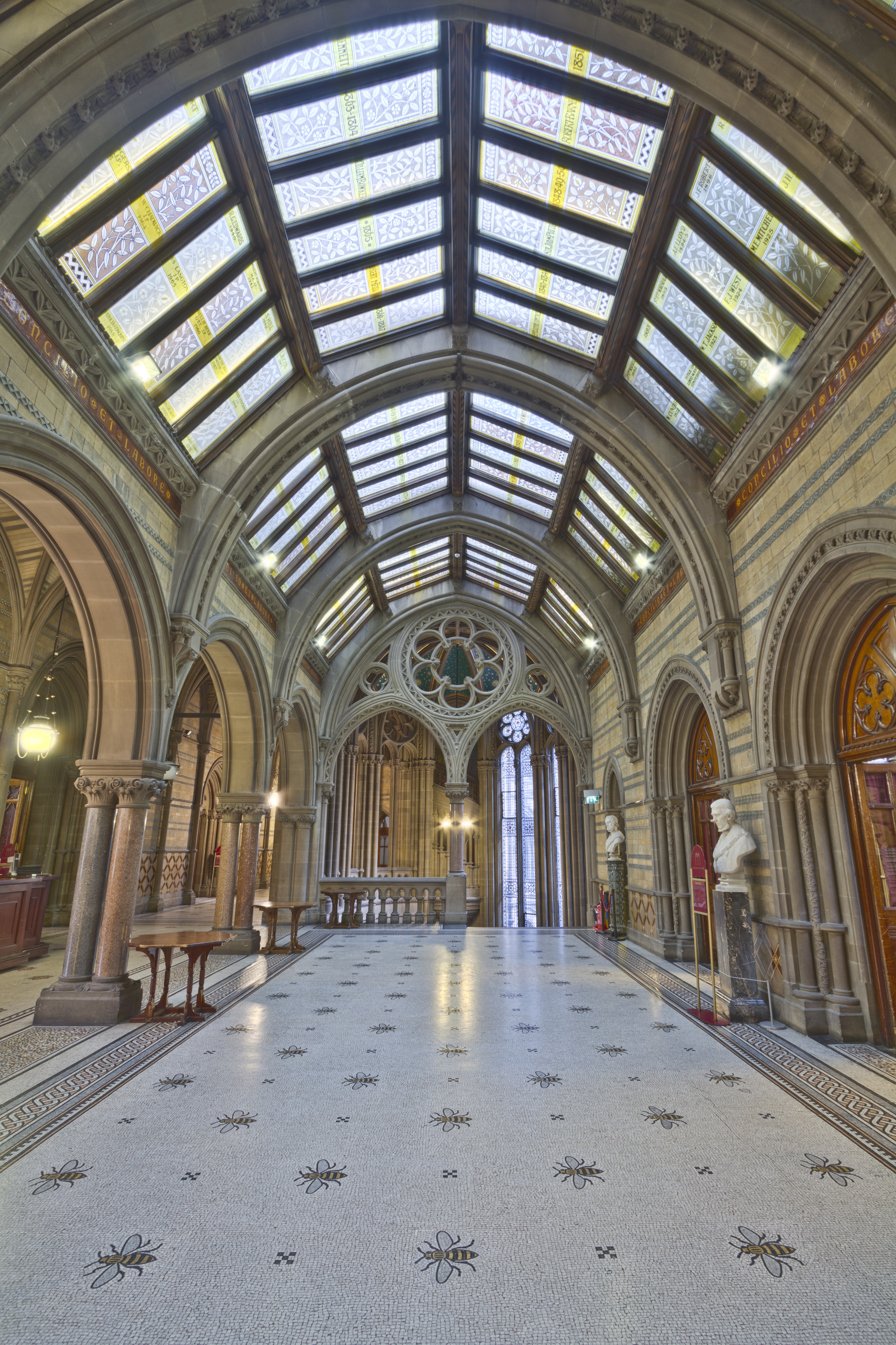
The landing outside the Great Hall, Manchester Town Hall, showing the mosaic floor, and skylights providing light not just for the landing but to the adjacent corridor, the column shafts are of grey or red granite, the arches are of stone, the dado has a pattern formed of plain ceramic tiles, the upper walls are clad in buff coloured terracotta, interspersed with thin bands of blue terracotta, the doors on the right lead into the Great Hall

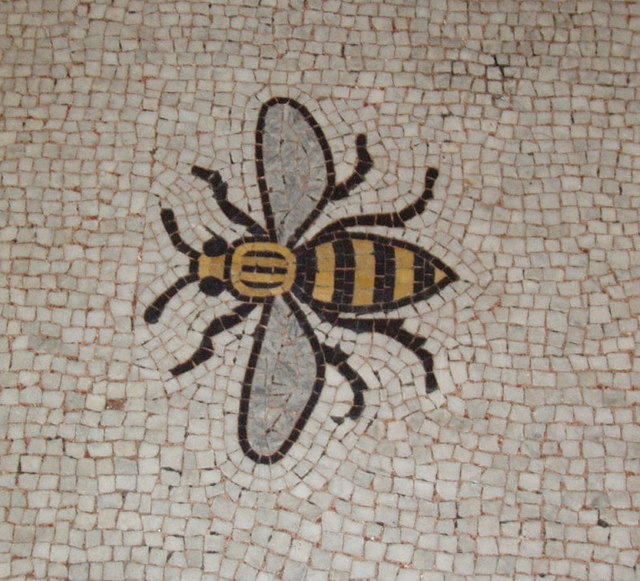
Mosaic bee, on the floor of landing outside Great Hall, Manchester Town Hall, symbolic of Manchester's industriousness

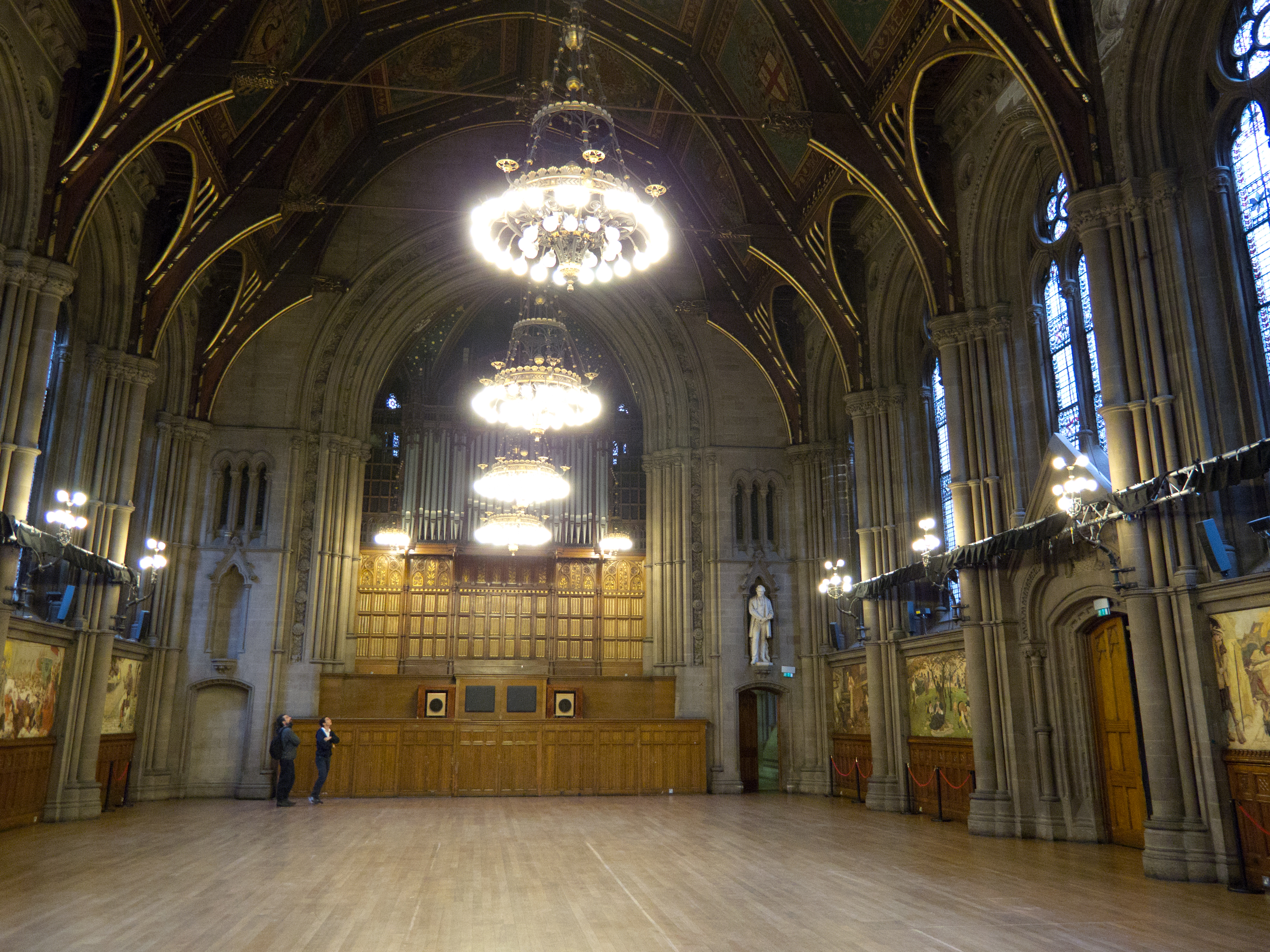
The Great Hall, Manchester Town Hall, is 50 feet wide and about 100 feet long, with Waterhouse's wooden roof with painted coats of arms, gasoliers and its lower walls decorated with Ford Madox Brown's The Manchester Murals

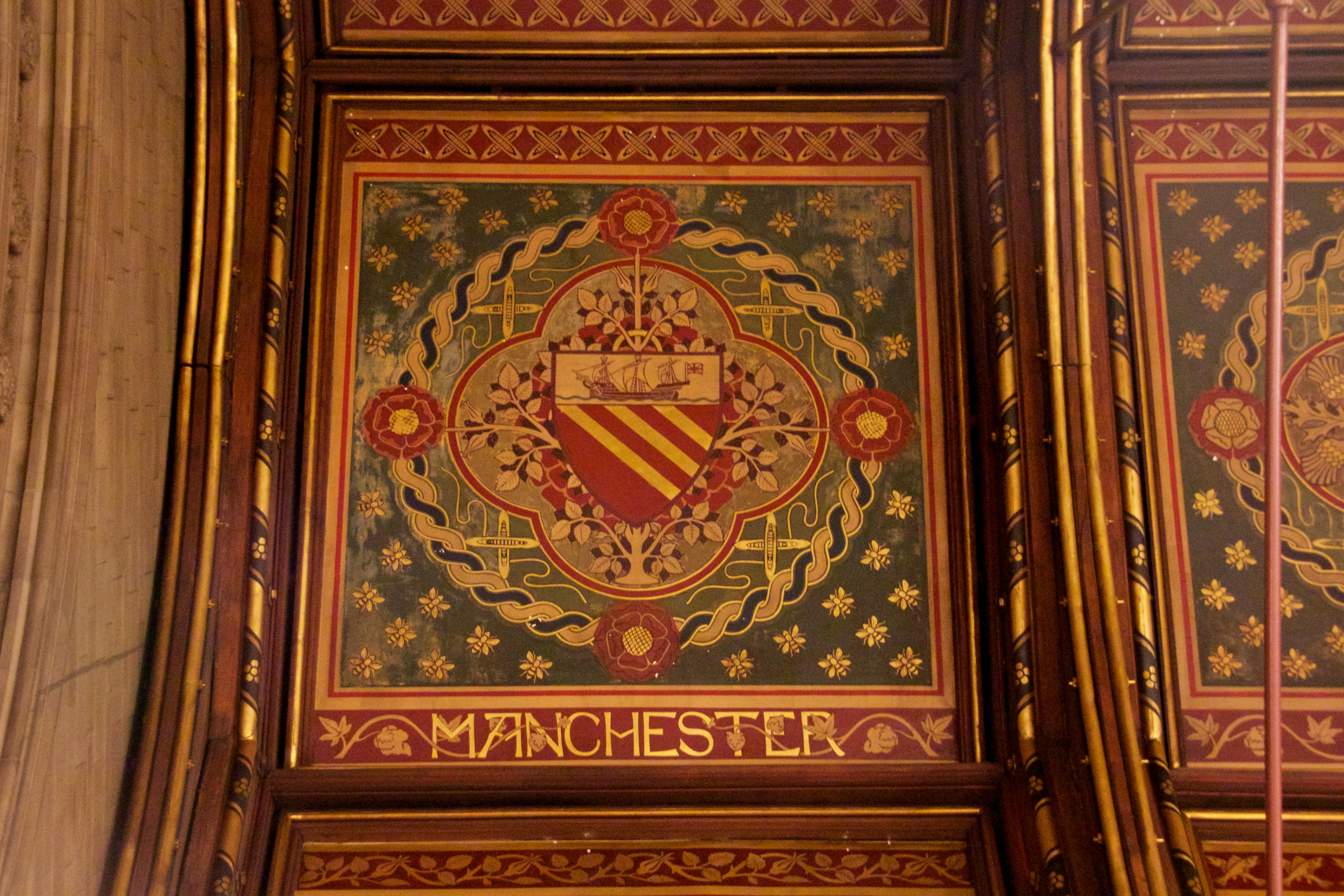
Painting of coat of arms of Manchester, on the roof of the Great Hall, Manchester Town Hall, the other coats of arms on the roof represented cities and countries Manchester traded with

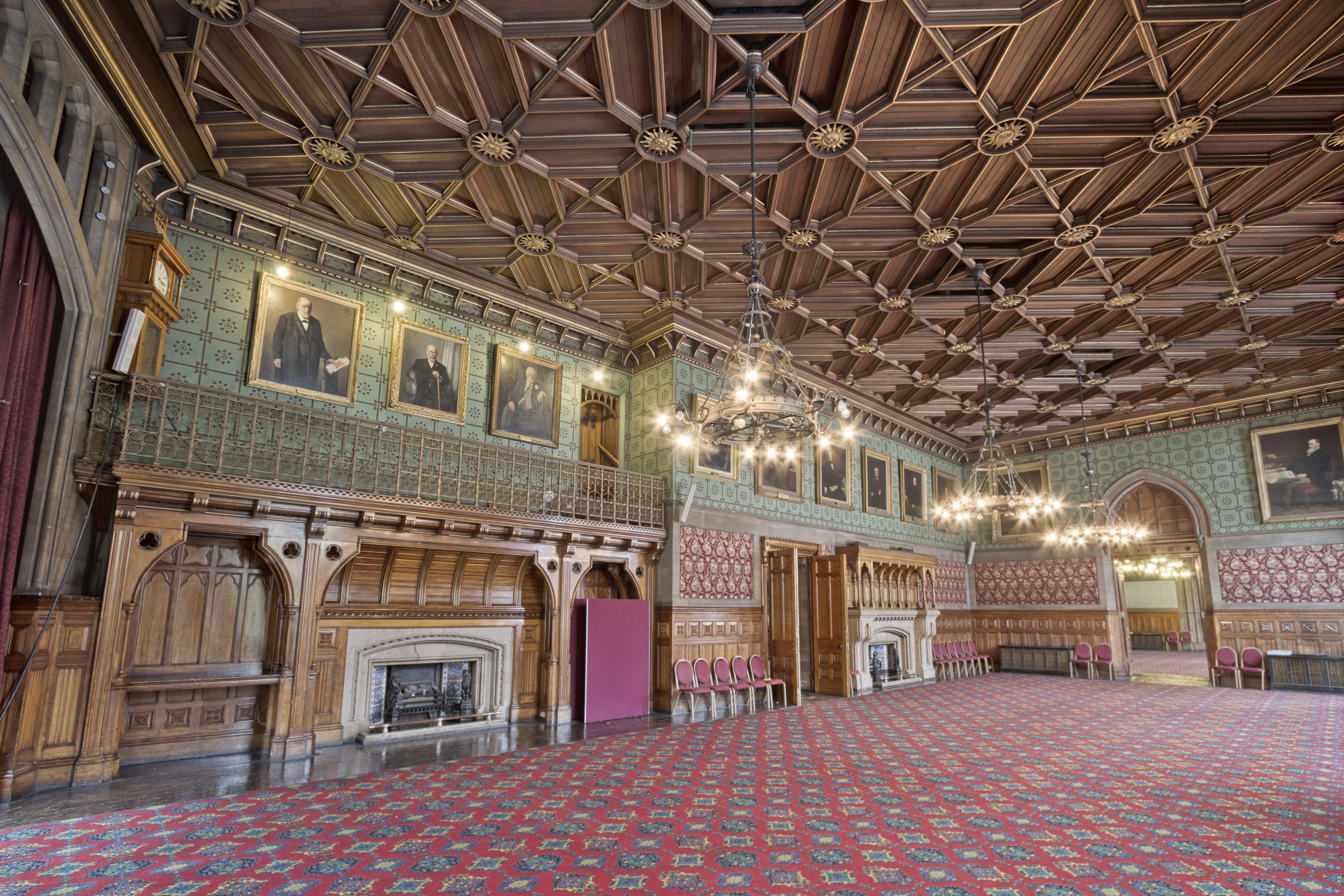
Gothic style Banqueting Room, Manchester Town Hall, showing a typical later style Waterhouse ceiling, note the fireplaces with stone fire-surrounds with tiled interiors and solid wooden over-mantles, on the left is an upper gallery with wrought-iron balustrade, for musicians to play on, the pendant light fittings are the original gasoliers converted to electricity.

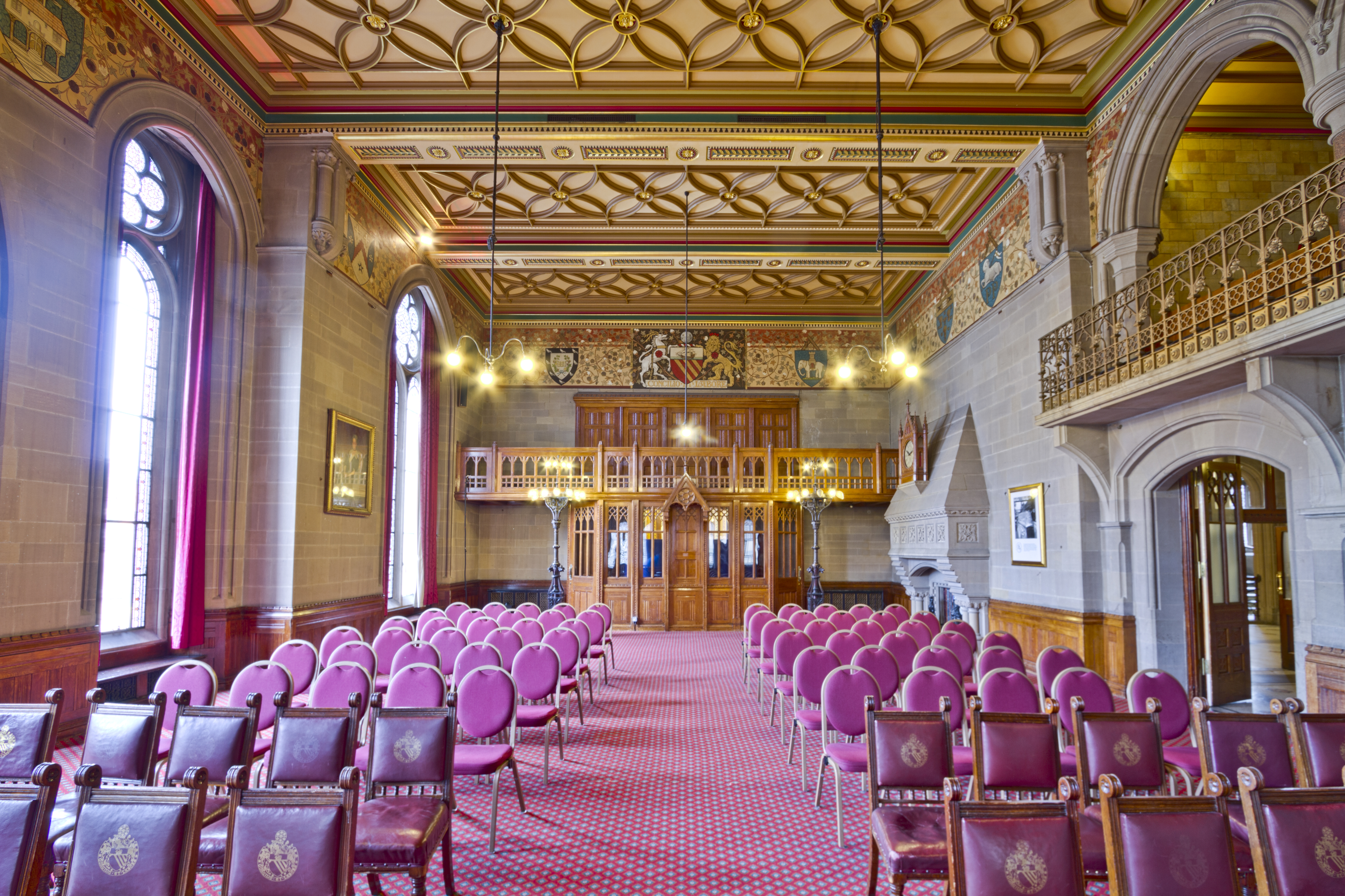
The original Council Chamber, Manchester Town Hall, the painted frieze around the top of walls has tendrils of cotton plants and contains shields with the coat of arms of the surrounding cotton-weaving towns. Note the gallery on the right with wrought-iron balustrade was for members of the public, the recess beneath housed the press, and the stone hooded fireplace, the Mayor's chair used to stand beneath the wooden canopy on the end wall, this was accessible from the Mayor's suite located on the other side of the wall, the wooden gallery above the screen was for the recording clerks

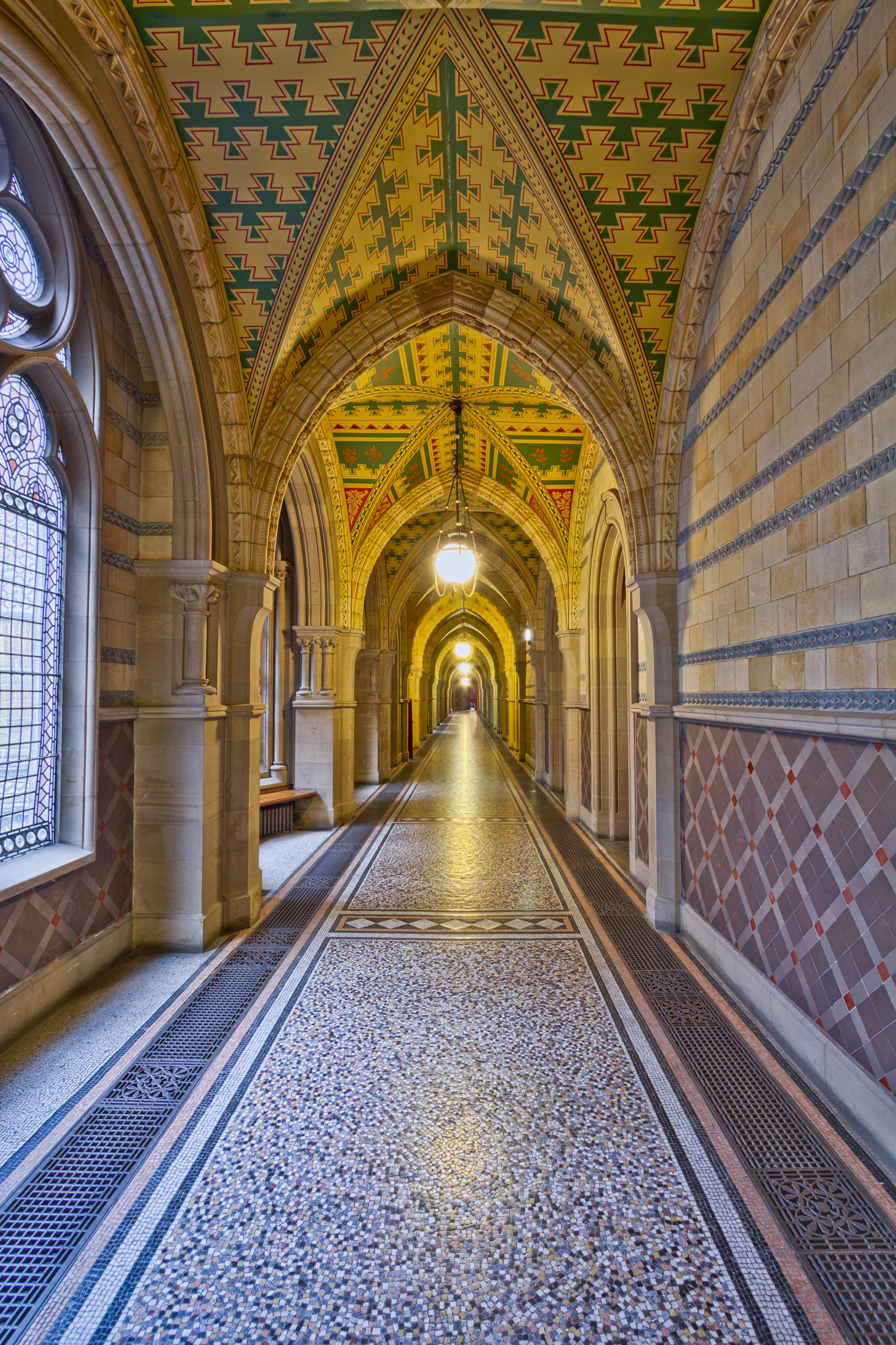
Gothic first floor corridor, Manchester Town Hall, (the corridors higher in the building are much plainer) showing use of ceramic wall tiles of different colours making a geometrical pattern, the upper walls are plain buff terracotta with horizontal lines of blue tiles running through (this was before faience became available), the floor is terrazzo with patterned mosaic borders, the vault painted with geometrical multi-coloured designs, also note the two decorative cast-iron grilles running along the floor, these cover the heating pipes

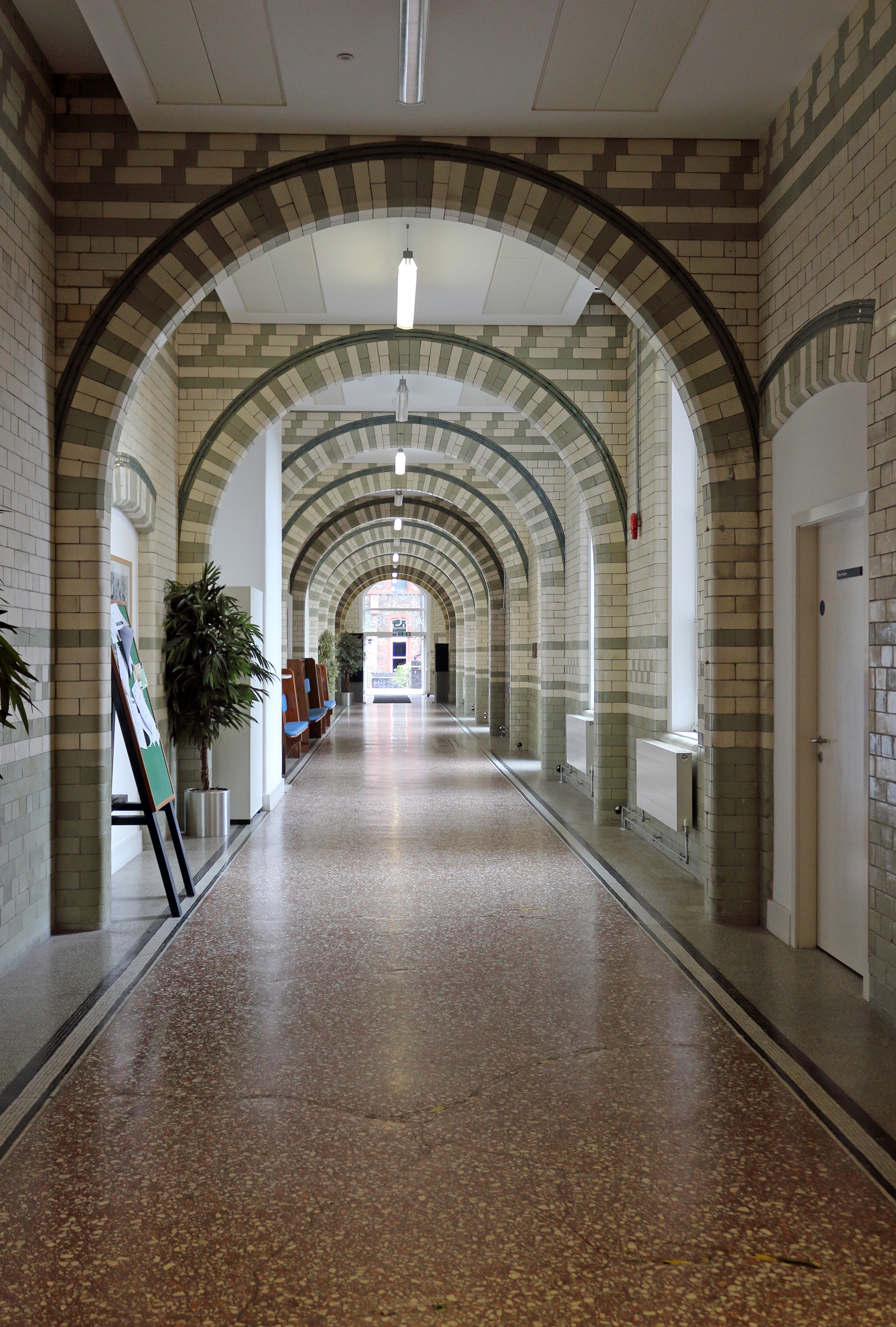
Spine corridor, Liverpool Royal Infirmary (1886–92), strictly utilitarian in style, showing the lack of mouldings and hygienic use of easily cleaned continuous terrazzo floors (normally Waterhouse created borders of mosaic for his terrazzo floors, but the grout would harbour dirt) and white and grey glazed brick walls forming simple patterns, the light colours also shows any dirt

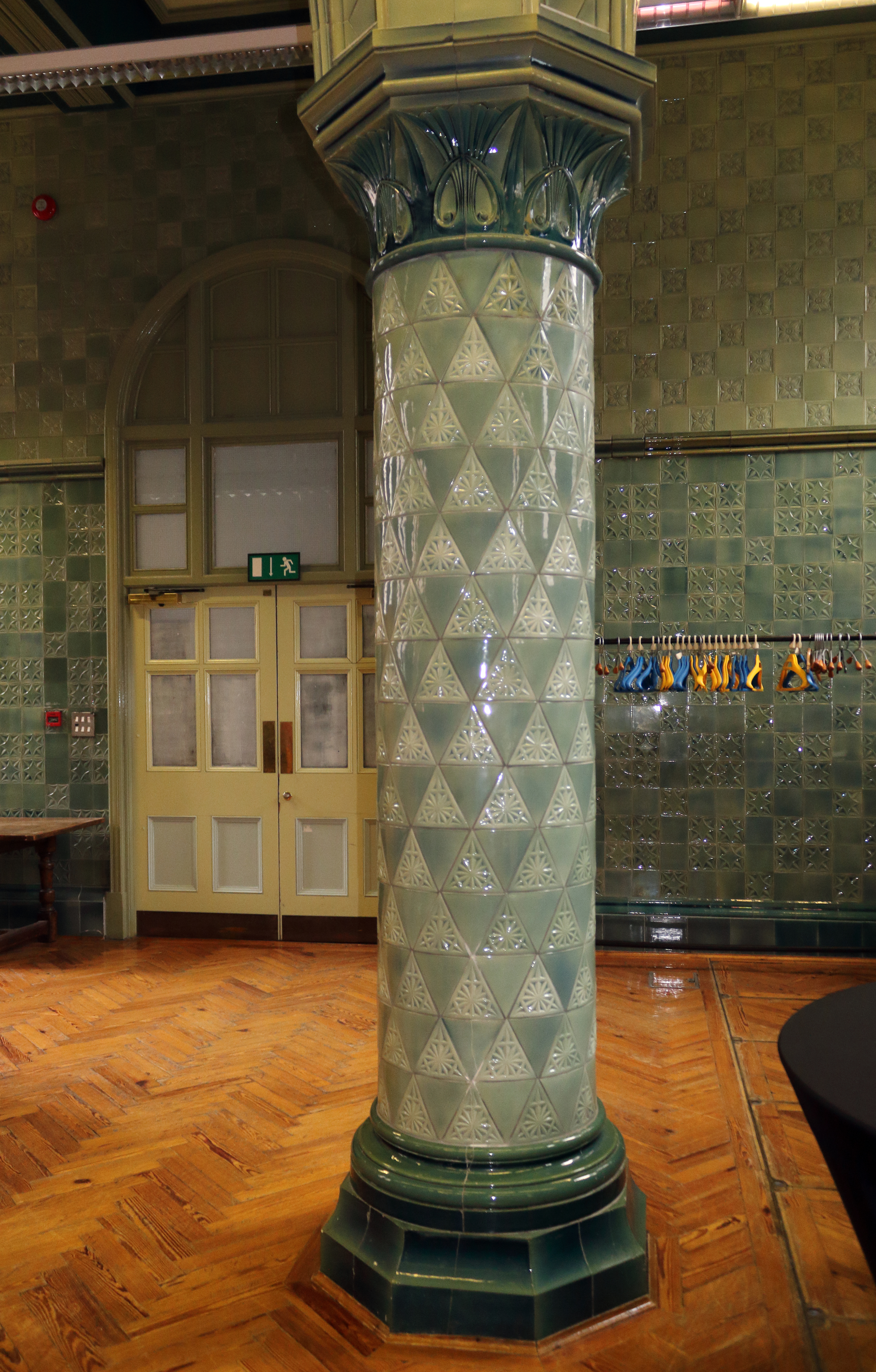
Faience column in the Chapel, Liverpool Royal infirmary, note the use of different shades of green to denote capital and base, also to subtly denote the plain and decorative tiles on the shaft

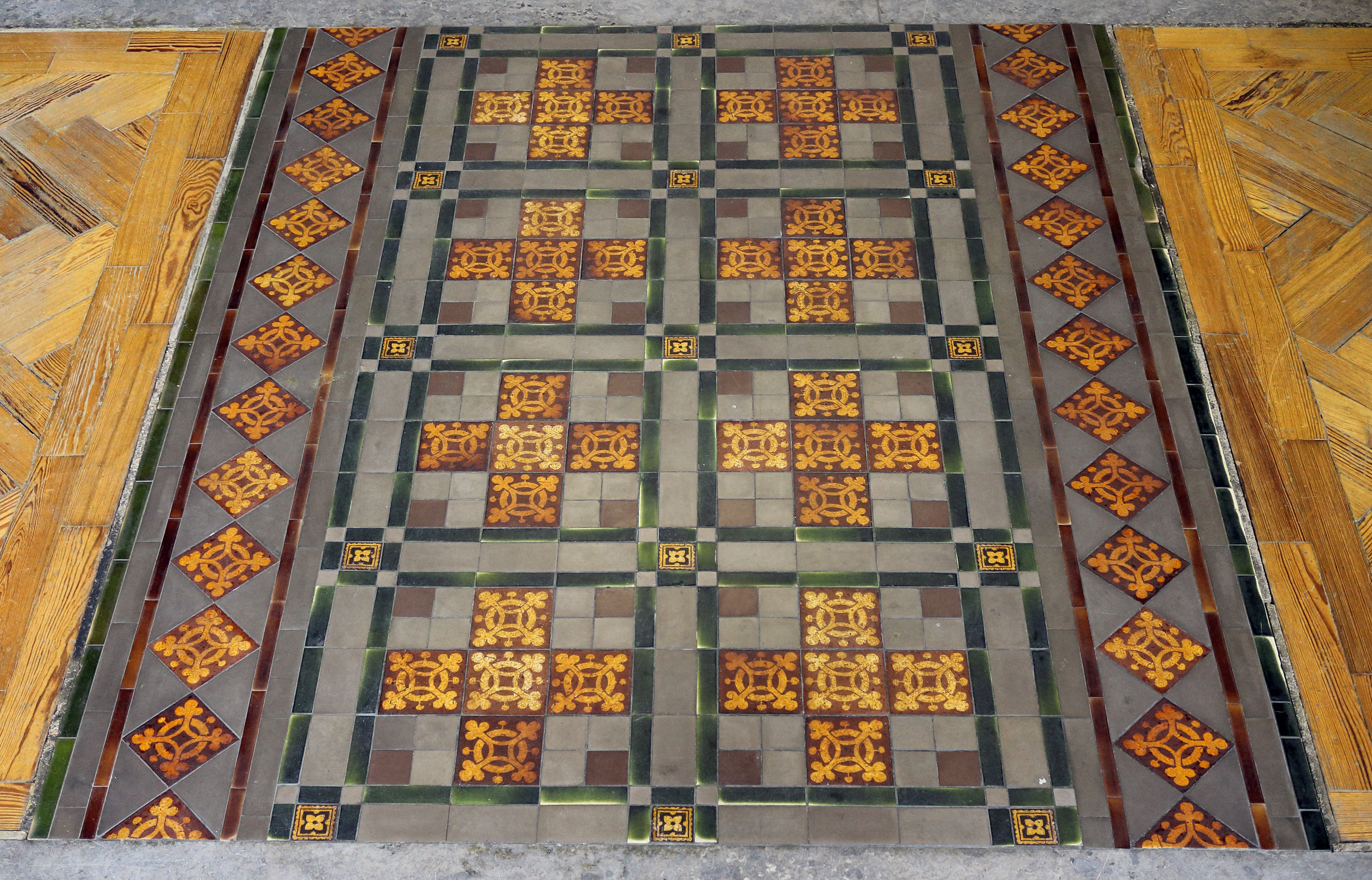
Tiling with plain and Encaustic tiles arranged in geometric patterns, surrounded by parquet floor, the Chapel, Liverpool Royal infirmary

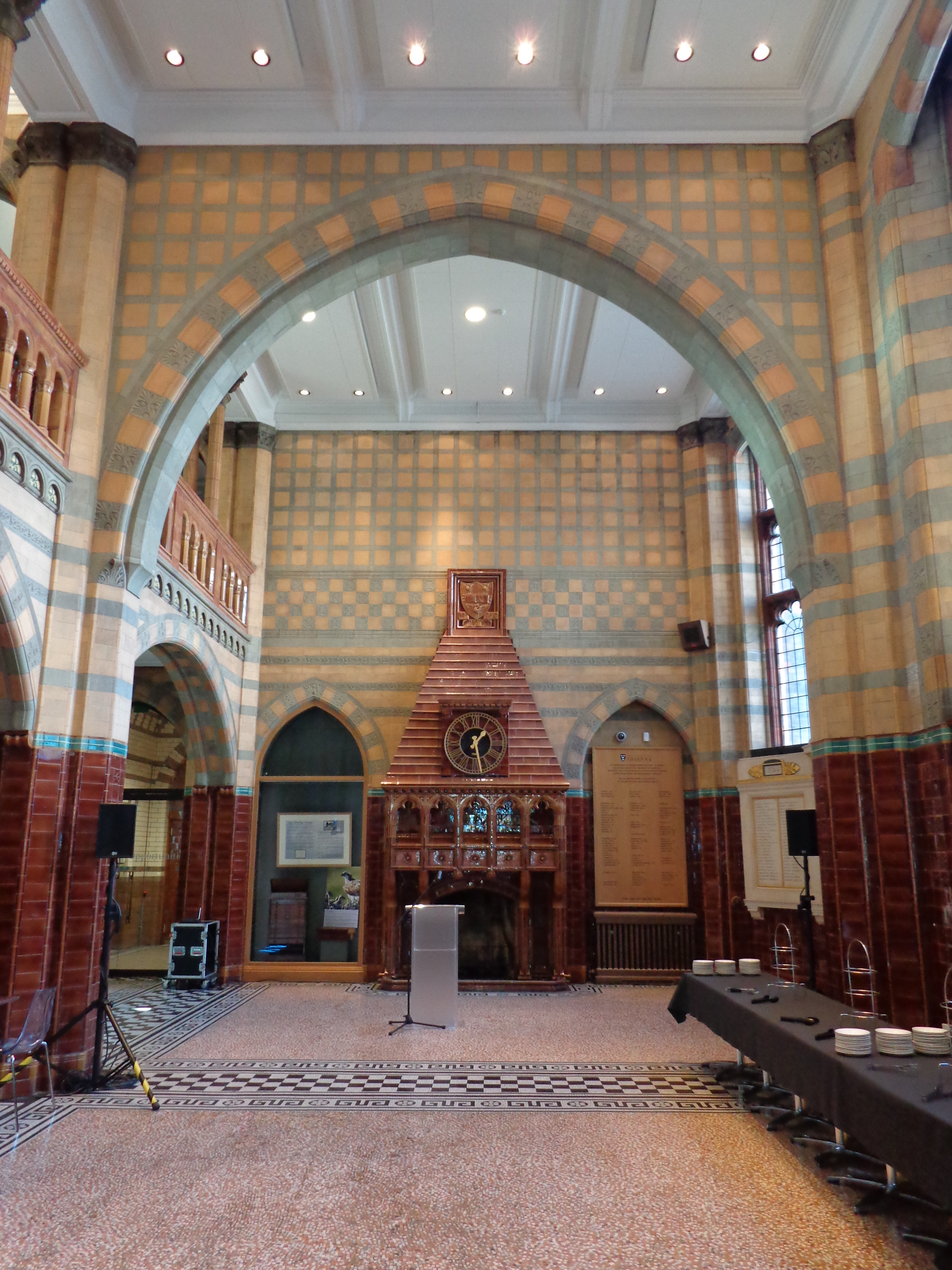
Main Hall, Victoria Building, University of Liverpool (1888), Gothic in style, with multicoloured faience covered walls, fireplace and balustrades, terrazzo floor with mosaic borders, this has some of the most ambitious schemes of coloured internal decoration of any of his buildings

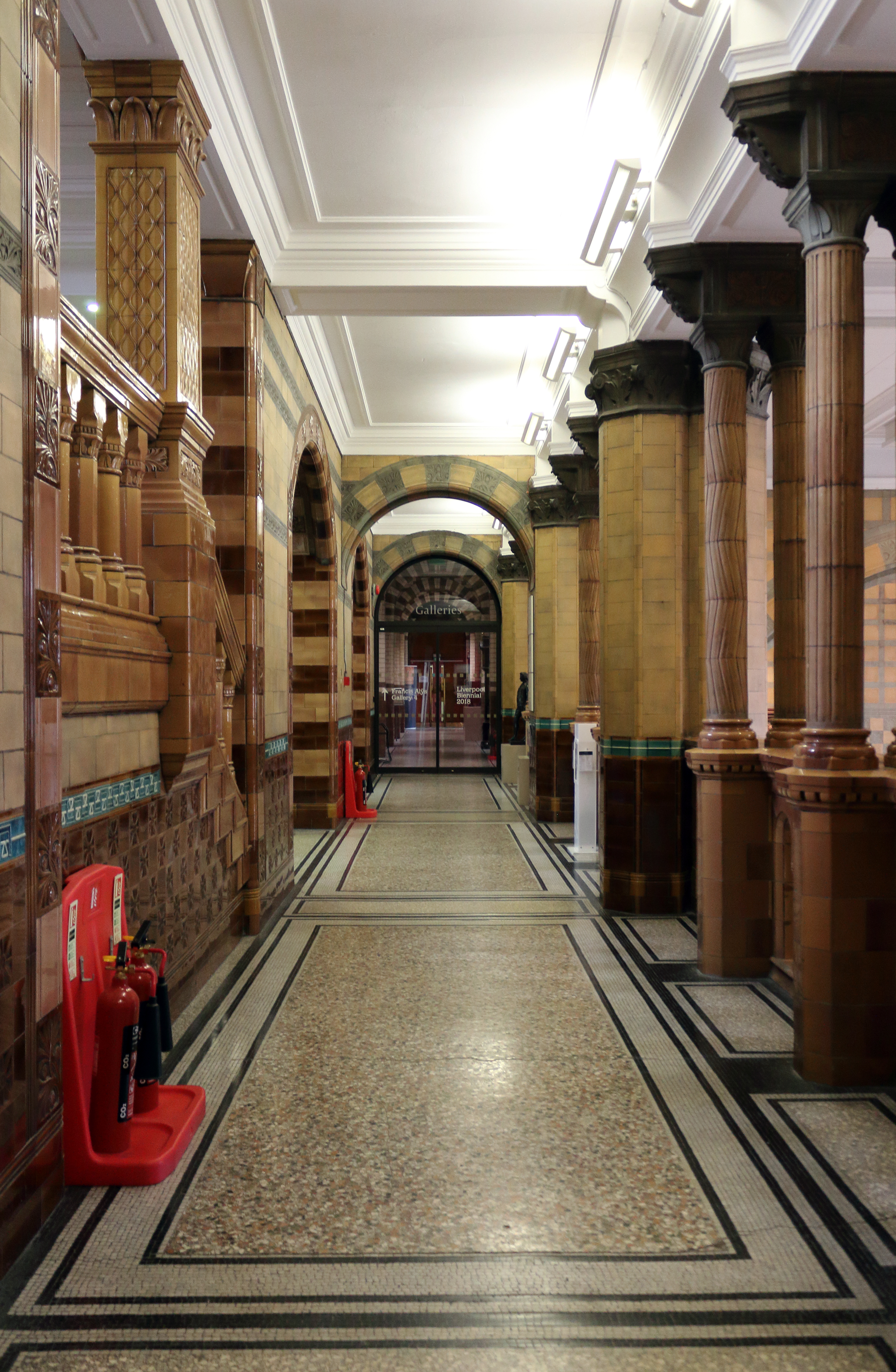
First-floor corridor, with faience tiled walls and terrazzo floor with mosaic border contrasted with the simple white plaster-work ceiling, Victoria Building, University of Liverpool

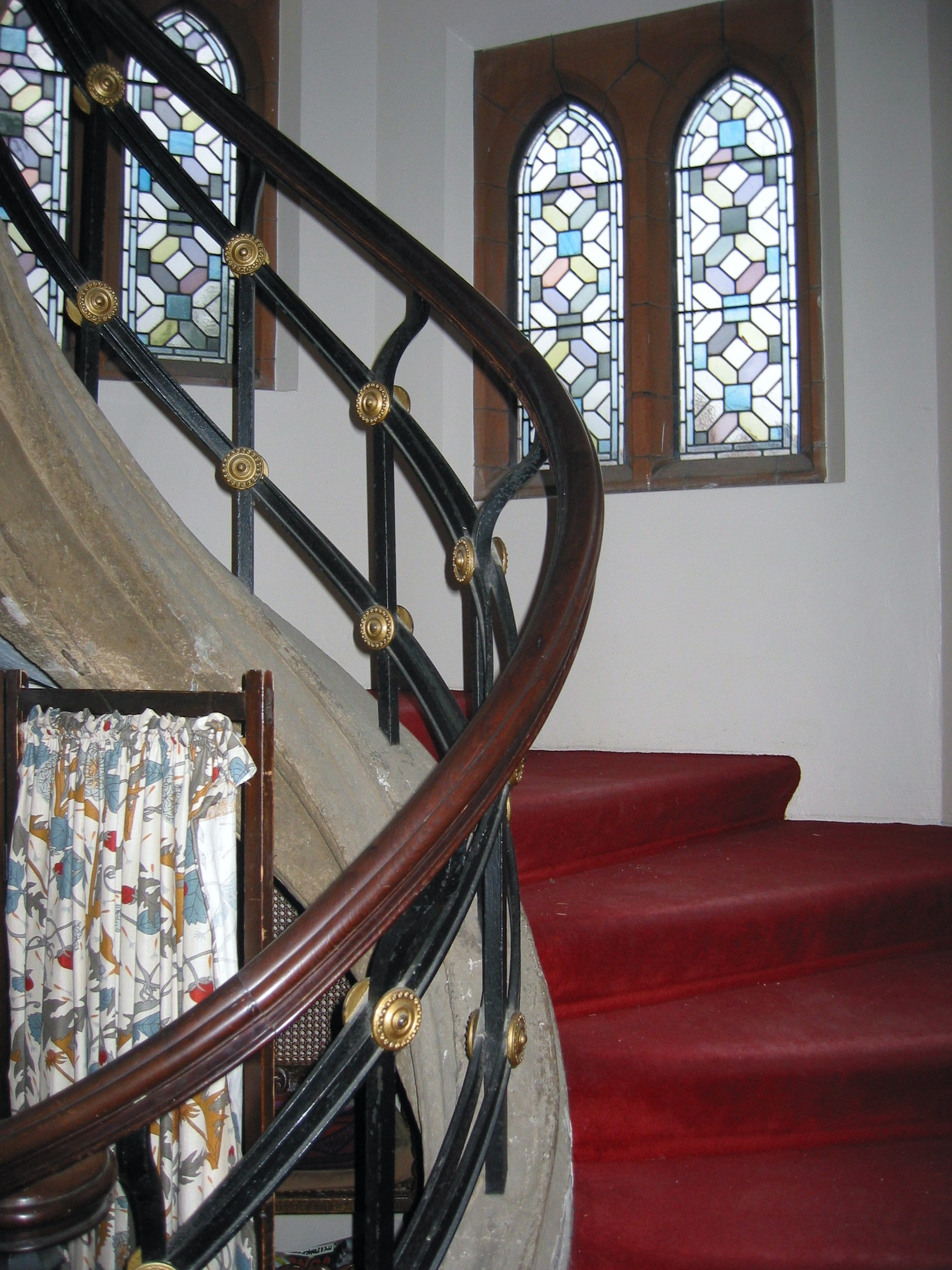
Simple wrought iron balustrade, and typical Waterhouse window glass, staircase, Girton College

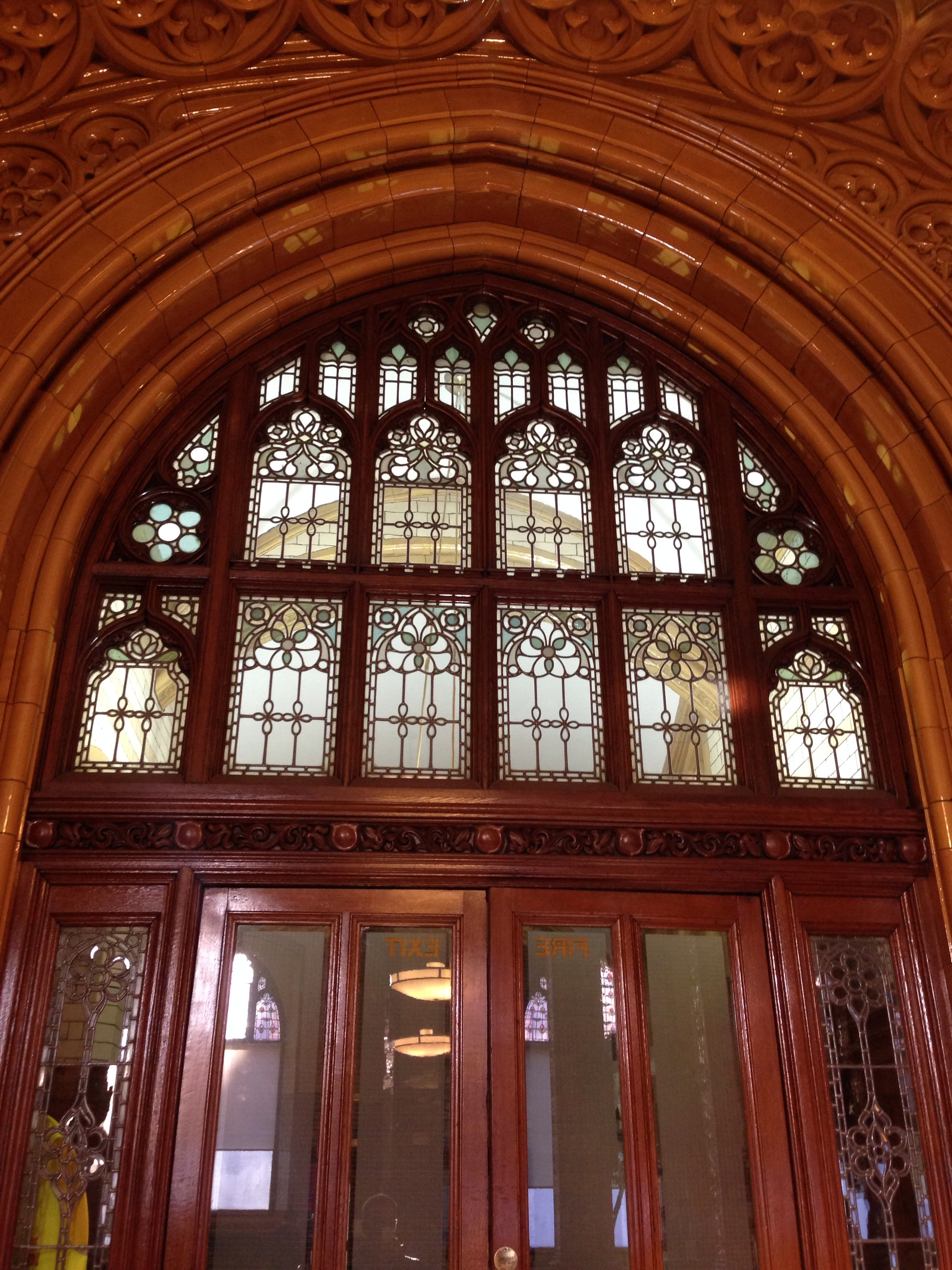
Prudential Assurance, Holborn Bars, Gothic style Woodwork and glazing using simple patterns and grey coloured and plain glass, with dark orange faience surround, in main entrance (c.1901)

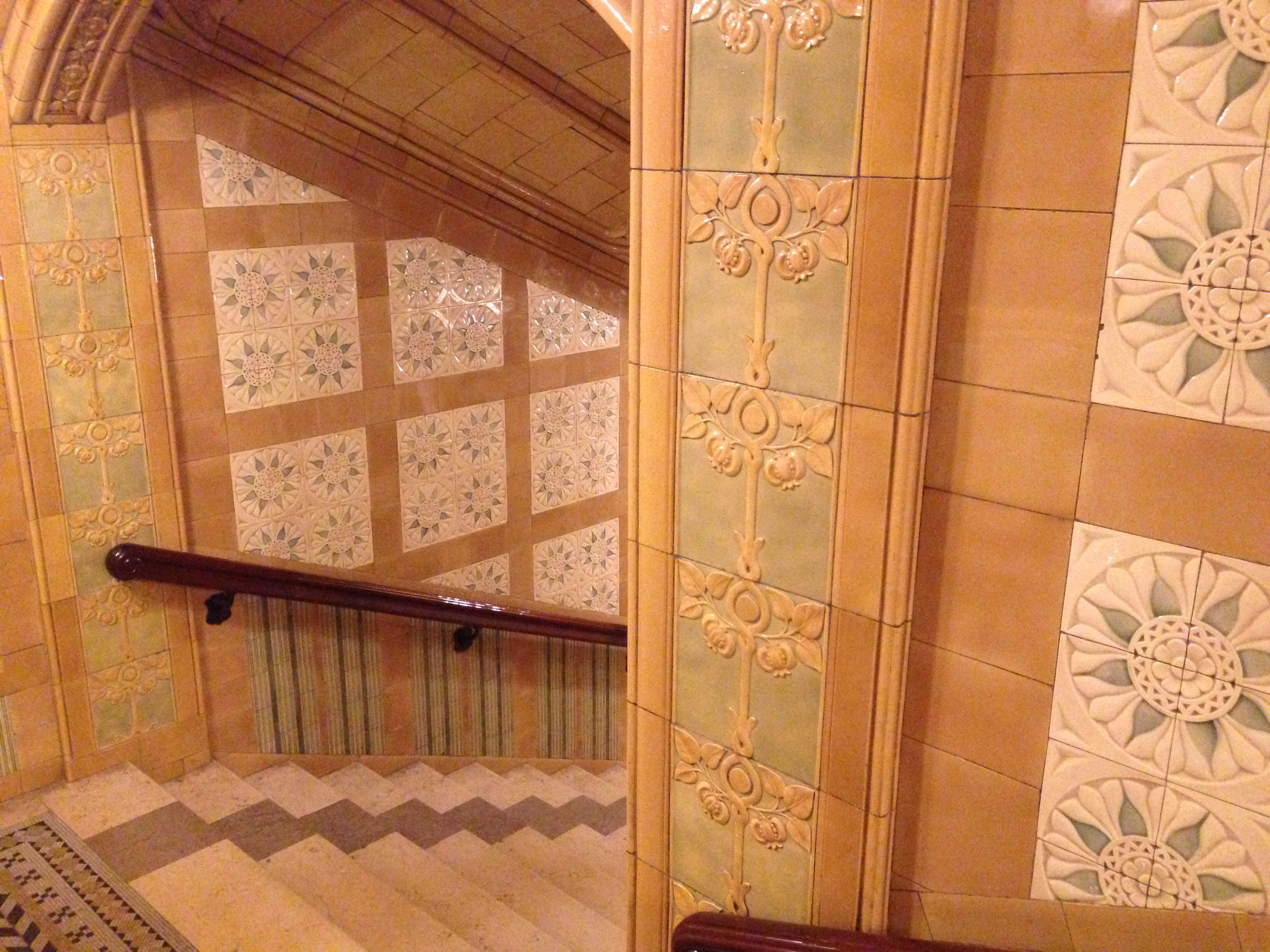
Faience tiling on the Directors' Staircase, Holborn Bars, showing a combination of pale colours and embossed designs, even the ceiling is of faience tiles, just visible bottom left, is the mosaic floor on the landing

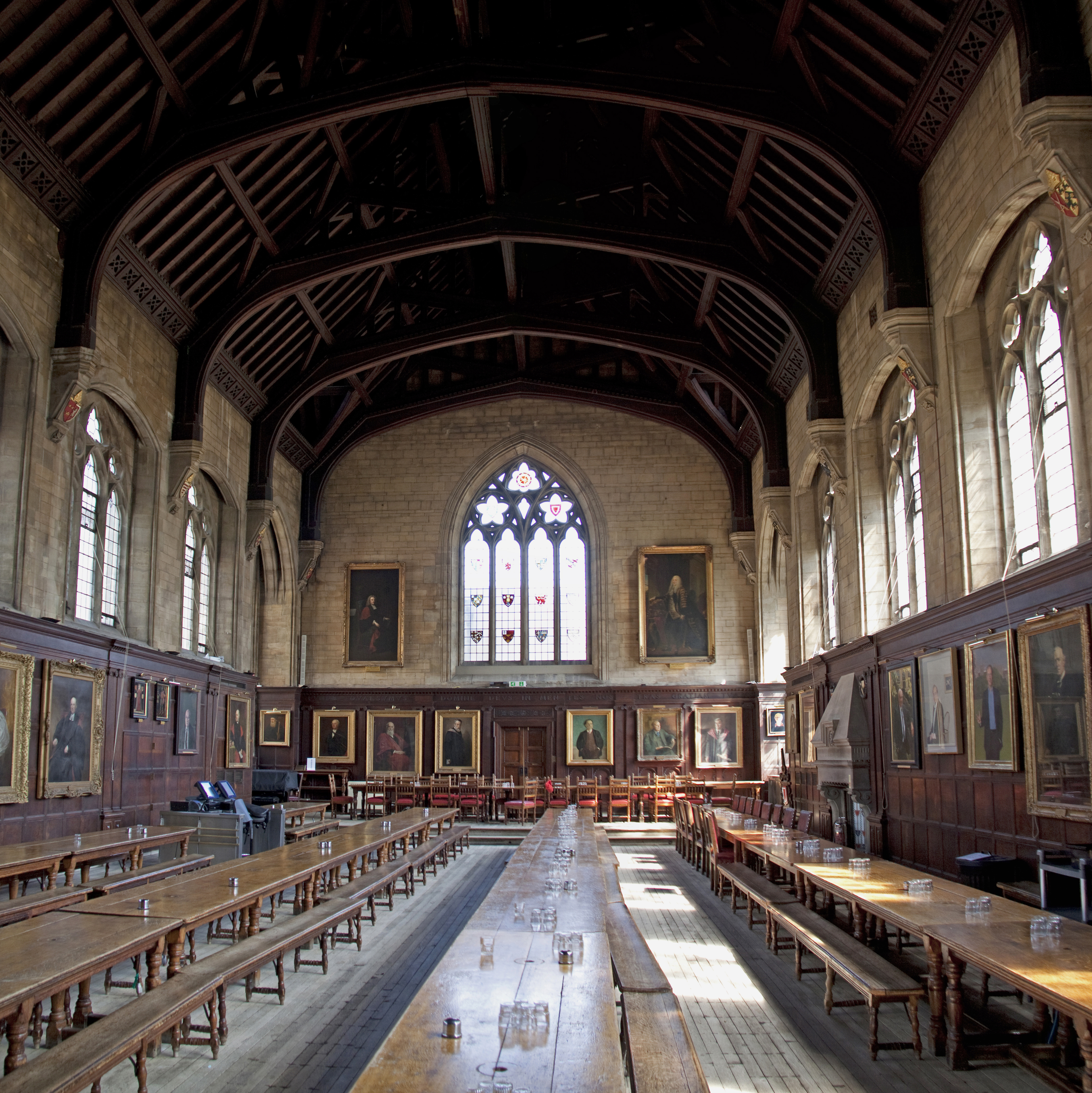
Interior, Hall, Balliol College, Oxford (1883) as with his hall at Girton College, the interior relies on the raw building materials there is no attempt to use tile work or other elaborate decoration save simple wood panelling and natural stonework, note the typically solid wooden braces in the roof resting on corbels that have coats of arms on them, there is also simple armorial stained glass in the end window.

=== Public buildings ===
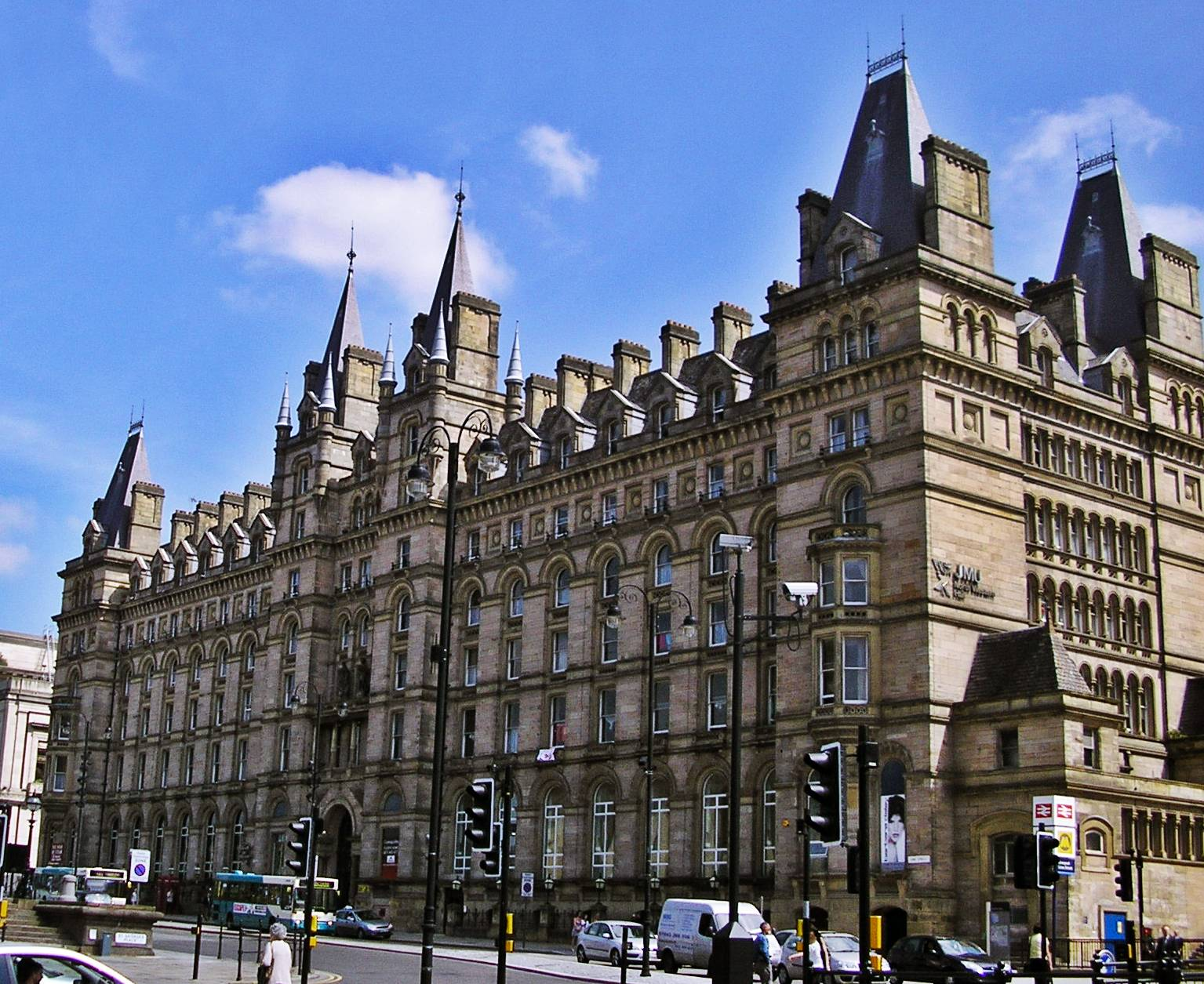
The former North Western Hotel, Lime Street, Liverpool, in a French Renaissance style, with its dramatic roof and towers typical of the style

Waterhouse designed the former North Western Hotel (1868–71), Lime Street, Liverpool, in the style of French Renaissance Revival architecture, it acted as the station hotel for Liverpool Lime Street railway station. Almost symmetrical in design, built from stone, five floors high plus dormer windows in the roof, there are towers with steep pavilion roofs at each corner and also two close together in the centre of the facade these have spire-like roofs with tourelles, the windows are mainly arched, there are double-storey oriel windows at the ends of the facade. Internally there is an impressive stone staircase with wrought-iron balustrade. The building cost £80,268. The main builders were Haigh & Co; heating and ventilation was by G.N. Haden and D.O. Boyd; the stone carving was by Farmer & Brindley; ceramic tiles were manufactured by Hargreaves & Craven; stained glass, notably the ceiling over the grand staircase was by Heaton, Butler & Baine; chimneypieces were provided by W.H. Burke; the iron work was manufactured by Lester & Hodkinson; and R. Jones; the plaster ceiling roses were made by J.W. Hindshaw.

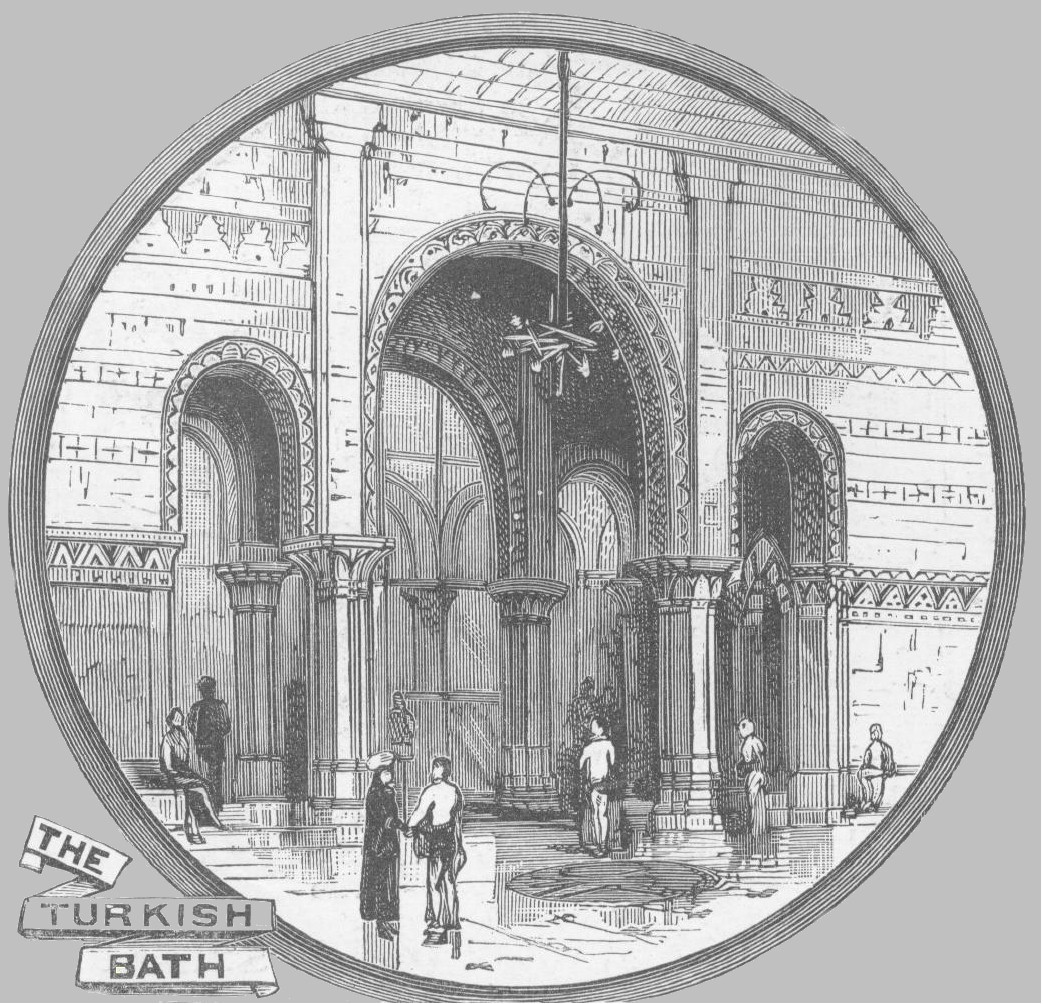
Part of Metropole Turkish cooling-room

The other major hotel designed by Waterhouse is the Metropole Hotel (1888–89) in Brighton, a seafront hotel, six floors high (a seventh was added later not by Waterhouse). It is in an Italian Renaissance style. Built from red Rowlands Castle brick and terracotta, with a Ruabon tile and zinc roof, there are decorative iron balconies along much of the facade. The facilities included an attached ballroom, with garden court, and Victorian Turkish baths. The builders were J.T. Chappel; structural steel-work was by A. Handyside & Co.; the terracotta was manufactured by Gibbs and Canning and Joseph Cliff & Son; faience tiling was by Burmantofts; clocks were by Gillett & Co.; with the lifts by Waygood. The clerk of works was T. Holloway. Built at the cost of £14,720 (approx £1,850,000 in 2019).

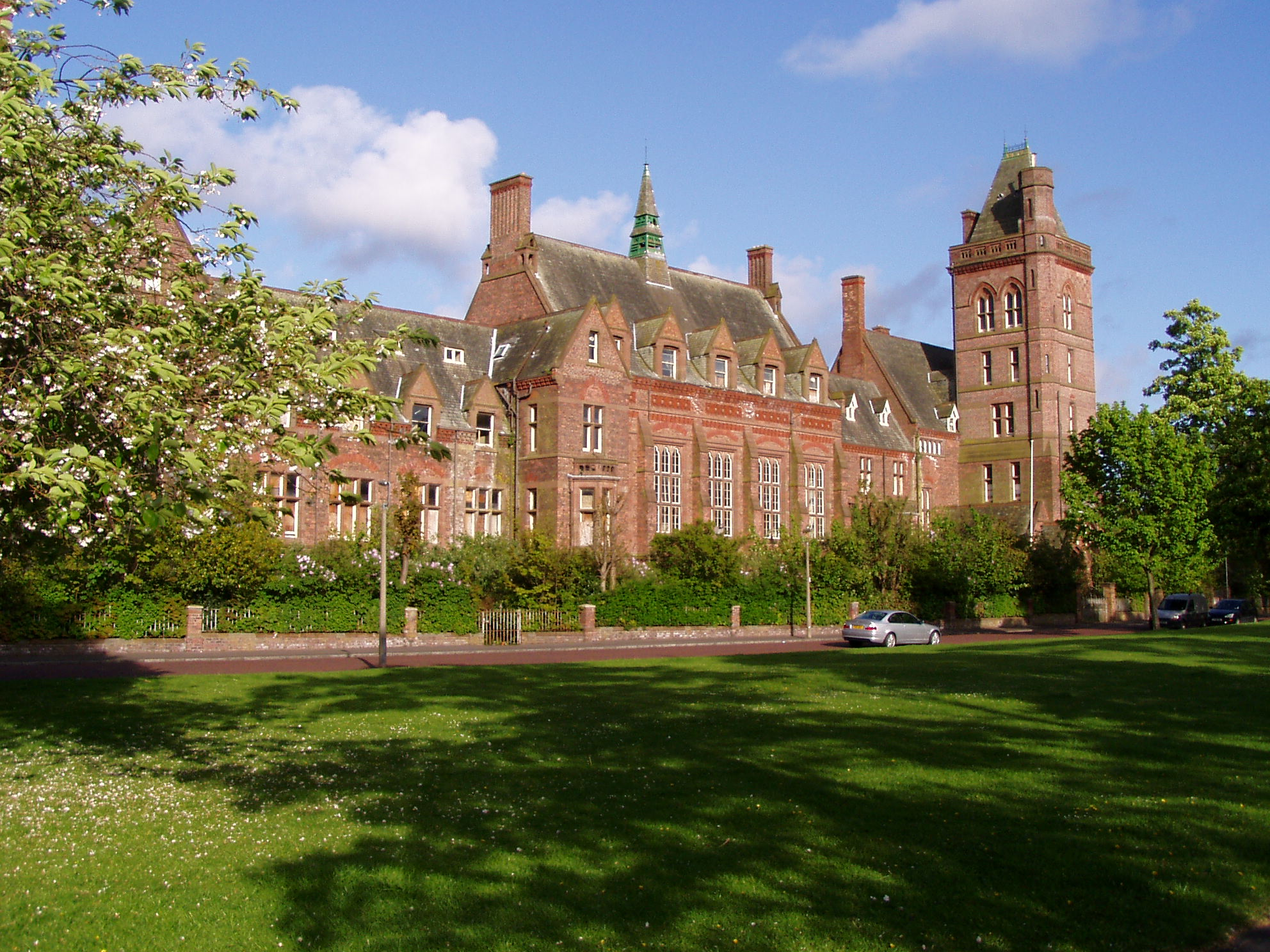
Former Seamen's Orphan Institution, Liverpool, with the Great Hall in the centre

The former Liverpool Seamen's Orphan Institution and chapel (now called Newsham Park Hospital) (1870–75) (the Chapel has been demolished), built in a Gothic style with tall pavilion roofs, Built from brick with stone dressings, with slate roofs. It provided a home and school for over 300 orphans. L-shaped in plan, there is a tall tower on the south-west angle, there is also a large hall that separated the boys' and girls' wings. The builders were Haigh & Co.; structural steel work was by J. S. Bergheim; the heating and ventilation systems were by G.N. Haden and D.O. Boyd; the stone carvings were executed by Farmer & Brindley; ceramic tiling was made by W. Godwin; the window glass was made by F.T. Odell; the chimneypieces were made by the Hopton Wood Stone Co.; decorative iron work was by R. Jones and Hart Son Peard & Co.; the bell was cast by John Warner & Sons. The orphanage cost £26,925 and the Chapel £6,550.

The former Knutsford Town Hall (1871–72) in Knutsford, Cheshire, paid for by William Egerton, 1st Baron Egerton, at a cost £6,740 (approx £770,000 in 2019). It consisted of market hall with Assembly Rooms above. Gothic in style, built from red and blue brick with a tiled roof, there is a limited amount of stone in the building. It was built by J. Parnell & Sons; heating was by G.N. Haden; the stone was carved by Farmer & Brindley; ceramic tiles were made by W. Godwin; the stained glass was by R.B. Edmundson and F.T. Odell; decorative iron work was by R. Jones and; the plaster ceiling roses were made by J.W. Hindshaw.

Waterhouse designed the Shire Hall at Bedford in two phases (1878–81) and (1881–83), that acted as the town's assize courts. Gothic in style was built from dark red brick and red terracotta with a slate roof. The building cost for the first phase £14,495 and for the second £10,345. The builders were John Wood; heating and ventilation was by G.N. Haden and D.O. Boyd; the modelling of the terracotta was by Farmer & Brindley; the ceramic tiles were made Craven Dunnill & Co. and W. Godwin; glass was provided by F.T. Odell; chimney-pieces were by the Hopton Wood Stone Co.; furniture was made by Wells & Co. of Bedford; decorative iron work was executed by Hart Son Peard & Co. and R. Jones; locks and door furniture was made by J. Gibbons.

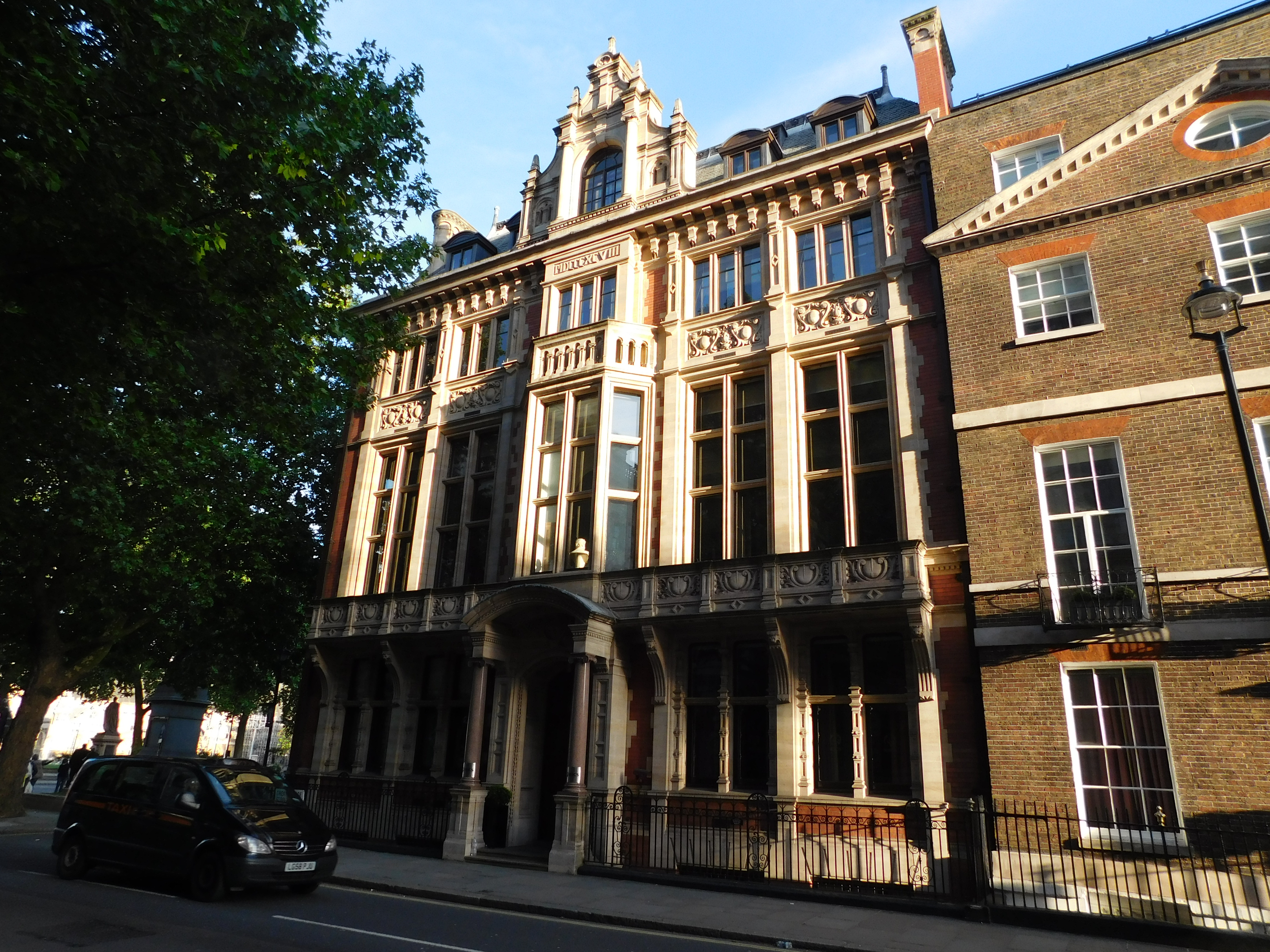
Royal Institution of Chartered Surveyors, Great George St, London (1896-98), Jacobethan in style

Wigan Free Library (now the Museum of Wigan Life) (1873–78), is Tudor in style, brick with stone dressings, included internal fittings. Its construction was funded by mill owner Thomas Taylor. The building cost £9,955. It was built by the firm of Hughes of Liverpool; the heating and ventilation was by G.N. Haden and D.O. Boyd; the stone carving was by Earp & Co.; the window glass was by F.T. Odell; chimney-pieces were made by the Hopton Wood Stone Co.; internal decoration was by R. Pollitt; furniture and fittings were made by G. Goodall & Co.; decorative iron work was made by R. Jones and Hart Son Peard & Co.

The Turner Memorial Home (1882–85), Liverpool, extended in (1887–89), Gothic home and chapel for seamen, stone and with tiled roof and half-timbered porch. Built for Mrs Anne Turner as a memorial to her dead husband and son. It cost £32,170 (approx £3,750,000 in 2019). The builders were Holme & Nichol; heating and ventilation was by G.N. Haden and D.O. Boyd; the stone carving was by Earp & Hobbs; granite columns were provided by G. & J. Fenning; ceramic tiles were made by Craven Dunnill & Co.; the stained glass was made by Heaton Butler & Bayne and R.B. Edmundson; chimney-pieces were provided by W.H. Burke, Blackmore & Nixon and the Hopton Wood Stone Co.; decorative iron work was made by R. Jones and Hart Son Peard & Co.; the external clock was made by Gillett & Co.; the organ in the chapel was by Gray and Davison.

The Royal Institution of Chartered Surveyors (1896), 12 Great George Street, Westminster, London. The building consists of offices, hall, library and museum, Built of red brick and Darley Dale stone, built in a Jacobethan style, it cost £27,770 to build (approx £3,500,000 in 2019). The builders were Foster & Dicksee, with the structural steel work by A. Handyside & Co.; heating and ventilation systems were installed by J. Jeffreys; the stone carving was by Farmer & Brindley; ceramic tiles were made by Craven Dunnill & Co.; the mosaic flooring was made by L. Oppenheimer; decorative iron work was made by Hart Son Peard & Co.

As well as Manchester, Waterhouse designed two town halls Reading and Hove, as well as designing the clock tower of Rochdale Town Hall, in England and one in Scotland at Alloa.

In (1871–76) Waterhouse extended Reading's Georgian Town Hall, with his range of Gothic Municipal Buildings, of sandstone, brick and terracotta, it contained a new council chamber and office, there is a clock tower with carillon added in 1881, cost £8,650 (approx £980,000 in 2019). The builders were J. Parnell & Sons; structural steel work was by J.S. Bergheim; the terracotta was modelled by Farmer & Brindley; ceramic tiles were by Craven & Co.; stained glass was by F.T. Odell; interior painted decoration was by R. Pollitt; fittings and furnishings were made by H. Capel; the decorative iron work was executed by Hart Son Peard & Co.; the clock and bells were manufactured by Gillett & Bland.

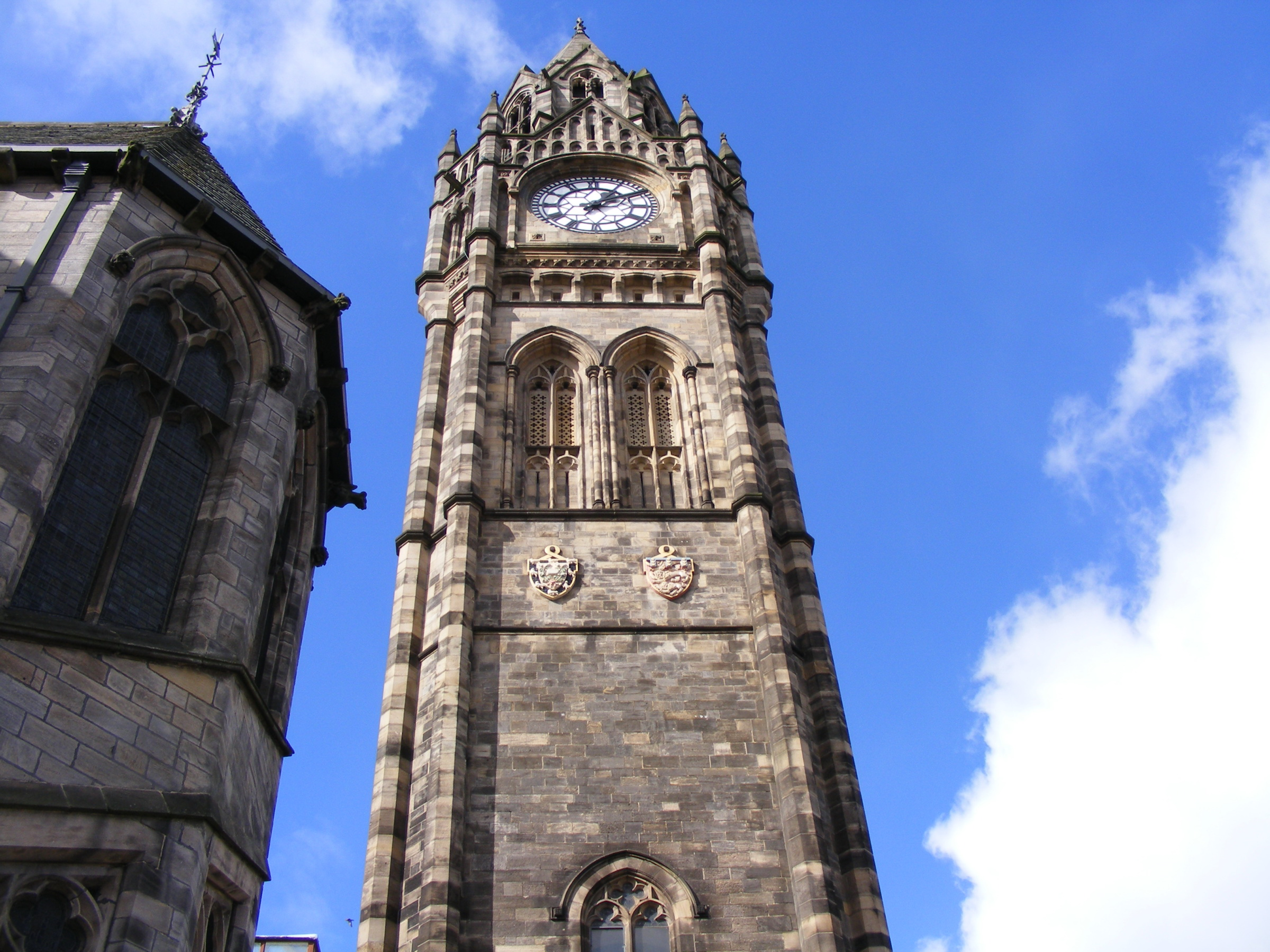
The clock tower (1885-88) at Rochdale Town Hall, showing the carved stone work by Earp & Hobbs

Waterhouse designed the new Town Hall in Hove Sussex, built in a Gothic style in (1880–83), it had a clock tower, it was demolished after being damaged by fire in 1966. The building contained municipal offices and the town's fire station. It was built from brick with terracotta dressings with a slate roof. It cost £39,920. The builders were John T. Chappell; heating and ventilation was by D.O. Boyd; stone carving and modelling of the terracotta was by Farmer & Brindley; ceramic tiles were made by W. Godwin; granite columns were provided by G. & J. Fenning; stained glass was made by F.T. Odell; chimney-pieces were by the Hopton Wood Stone Co.; mosaic work was by Salviati; decorative iron work was by Hart Son Peard & Co. and R. Jones; the clock was manufactured by Gillett & Bland; the organ in the main hall was built by Henry Willis; the decorative plaster work was J.W. Hindshaw.

After the tower at Rochdale Town Hall was destroyed by fire Waterhouse designed its replacement (1885–88) it is 190 feet high, Gothic of stone to match the original building by William Henry Crossland. It cost £11,900 to build. The builder was W.A. Peters & Sons; the stone carving was by Earp & Hobbs; decorative iron work was by Hart Son Peard & Co., the clock was manufactured by Potts & Sons of Leeds and the bells were cast by John Taylor & Co.

The town hall in Alloa, Clackmannanshire, Scotland, is French Renaissance in style (1886–89). Built of Polmaise stone with a slate roof, of three floors, designed to contain not just the council, but a public library and art school, as well as a large hall. The building was paid for by local mill owner John Thompson Paton, it cost £18,008. The builders were G. & R. Cousin; heating and ventilation was installed by W.W. Phipson and D.O. Boyd; faience decoration was by Burmantofts; the mosaic flooring was made by W.H. Burke & Co.; the stained glass was made by R.B. Edmundson & Sons; the internal decoration was executed by Reed & Downie of Edinburgh; the enamelled and painted ceiling lights were made by Edmeston of Manchester; gas fittings were installed by Hart Son Peard & Co.; furniture and fittings were by Taylor & Sons and Whitlock & Reed of Edinburgh; the organ in the main hall was built by Forster and Andrews.

=== Commercial buildings ===
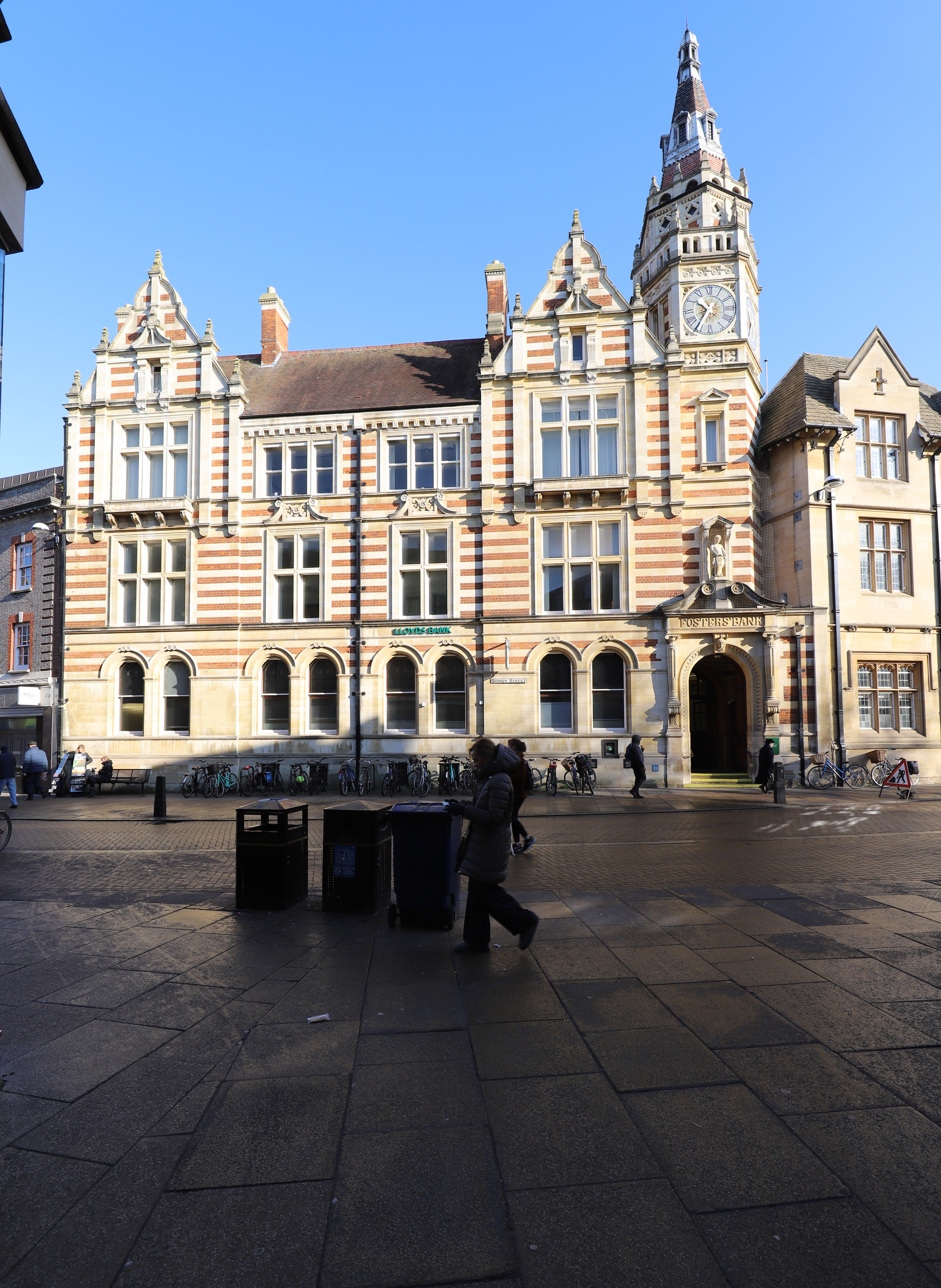
Former Foster's Bank, Sidney Street, Cambridge (1891), Jacobethan in style, using complex decoration

In addition to his extensive work for the Prudential Assurance Company (see section below), Waterhouse designed banks, offices, the occasional shop and warehouse buildings. Manchester even after he had moved to London proved a particularly fruitful source of commissions. Including 16 Nicholas Street (1872–75) a warehouse, built for Bryce Smith & Co. cotton manufacturers, in a Jacobethan style, five floors plus a basement and attic. Stylistically there are some Renaissance details but with Gothic as well. It is of red brick with stone dressings and a slate roof. It cost £8,625. There are a couple of building by Waterhouse in Spring Gardens, Manchester, no. 41 (1888–90) was built for the National Provincial Bank, built on a curving corner, five floors high, stone-faced, in a German Renaissance style, it cost £36,495. No 60-62 (1881–83) was built as a warehouse built for the company of J.H. Gartside & Co. who were cotton weavers, in a Renaissance revival style. It is stone-faced with rusticated arches on the ground floor, and with octagonal domed turrets at the corners. Three storeys tall with basement and attics with dormer windows with pediments, it cost £22,965.

Other commercial buildings by Waterhouse are the former Bassett and Harris Bank (1865–67) in Leighton Buzzard, Bedfordshire, is a solid two-story stone building, in a Gothic style. In London he designed 1a Old Bond Street (1880), Westminster, for Wakefield Christy, a shop with offices above, at a cost of £11,310 (approx £1,350,000 in 2019). He also designed offices for the National Provincial Bank in Piccadilly, London (1892–96), four floors high with a stone facade.

The distinctive Foster's Bank (1891–94), Sidney Street, Cambridge, built on an irregular site. In style it is Jacobethan. The exterior has a stone ground floor with banded stone and red brick covering the two upper floors and the gables. There is a clock tower on the right of the facade above the main entrance. The banking hall is octagonal and domed the centre of which is glazed, the walls and columns have faience decoration the floor is of mosaic. The builder was William Sindall; the structural steel work was by A. Hanyside & Co.; the stone carving, mainly around the doorway, on the clock tower and in the gables was by Farmer & Brindley; the ceramic tiles were made by Craven Dunnill & Co.; the faience was by Burmantofts; the mosaic flooring was by J.F. Ebner and J. Rust; the decorative iron work and light fittings were made by Hart Son Peard & Co.; the lighting was by Belshaw & Co.; the clock in the tower was made by John Moore & Sons of Clerkenwell. The bank cost £32,190.

In Leeds Waterhouse designed (1895–98) a bank and offices for the Williams Brown & Co. Bank, (now known as Greek Street Chambers) on Park Row. The ground floor is of polished dark grey granite with mullioned windows and porch with Ionic columns, the two upper floors are of banded red brick and buff terracotta, the roof is slate. There are low square towers with pyramidal roofs on two of the corners. The foundations were dug by S.M. McFarlane; the superstructure was erected by Armitage & Hodgson; the structural steel work was by J. Butler & Co.; stone carving was by W. Beveridge; the modelling of the terracotta was by Farmer & Brindley; the terracotta was manufactured by Burmantofts who also manufactured the faience used inside; internally the ceramic tiles were made by A. Whitehead who also laid the mosaic flooring; the furniture and fittings were made by Marsh Jones & Cribb. The building cost £45,110.

Waterhouse designed the Pearl Life Assurance Building (1896–98), St John's Lane, Liverpool, clad in stone, with a corner turret, of three floors with gabled attic windows. Though similar to his work for rivals the Prudential, the use of materials and the plainer walls set it subtly apart. The main office has walls clad in faience. The builders were F. Morrison & Sons; the structural steel work was by A. Hanyside & Co.; heating and ventilation was by J. Grundy; the stone carving was by Farmer & Brindley; the faience was manufactured by Burmantofts; the mosaic flooring was by J. Rust and J.F. Ebner; the chimney-pieces were made by Shuffrey & Co. and their principal Leonard Shuffrey; the decorative iron work and light fittings were made by Hart Son Peard & Co.. The cost was £20,076.

Waterhouse designed the corporate headquarters of the Refuge Assurance Building (1891–96), in Oxford Street, Manchester, in a Jacobethan style. It is five floors high of red brick and plum coloured terracotta, this first phase cost £86,525, the clock tower and wing to its right were added later by Paul Waterhouse. The foundations were dug by the company of C.H. Normanton, the superstructure was erected by William Southern & Sons., with the structural steel work by A. Handyside & Co.; heating and ventilation was by G.N. Haden; the terracotta was manufactured by Doulton & Co.; the modelling of the terracotta was by Earp & Hobbs; ceramic tiles were made by William de Morgan and D. Conway; the faience was by Burmantofts; the mosaic flooring was by J.F. Ebner; chimney-pieces were provided by J. & H. Patterson and W. Wilson; internal decoration was executed by Heighway & Son; furniture and fittings were made by G. Goodall & Co.; the decorative iron work was by Hart Son Peard & Co. and R. Jones.

=== Domestic buildings ===
During his career Waterhouse built or made major alterations to around ninety houses for clients of varying wealth. The clients were largely upper middle class rather than aristocrats. The houses ranged from country cottages, parsonages, suburban houses mainly in the expanding cities of the Victorian age to large country houses. In the 1860s and 1870s Waterhouse received an increasing number of commissions for larger country mansions from bankers and industrialists. Later in his career from around 1880, Waterhouse received fewer commissions for houses, fashions were changing. Late Victorian taste was turning to houses in the Queen Anne Style and in the Arts and Crafts style, both of which were at odds with Waterhouse's robust style.

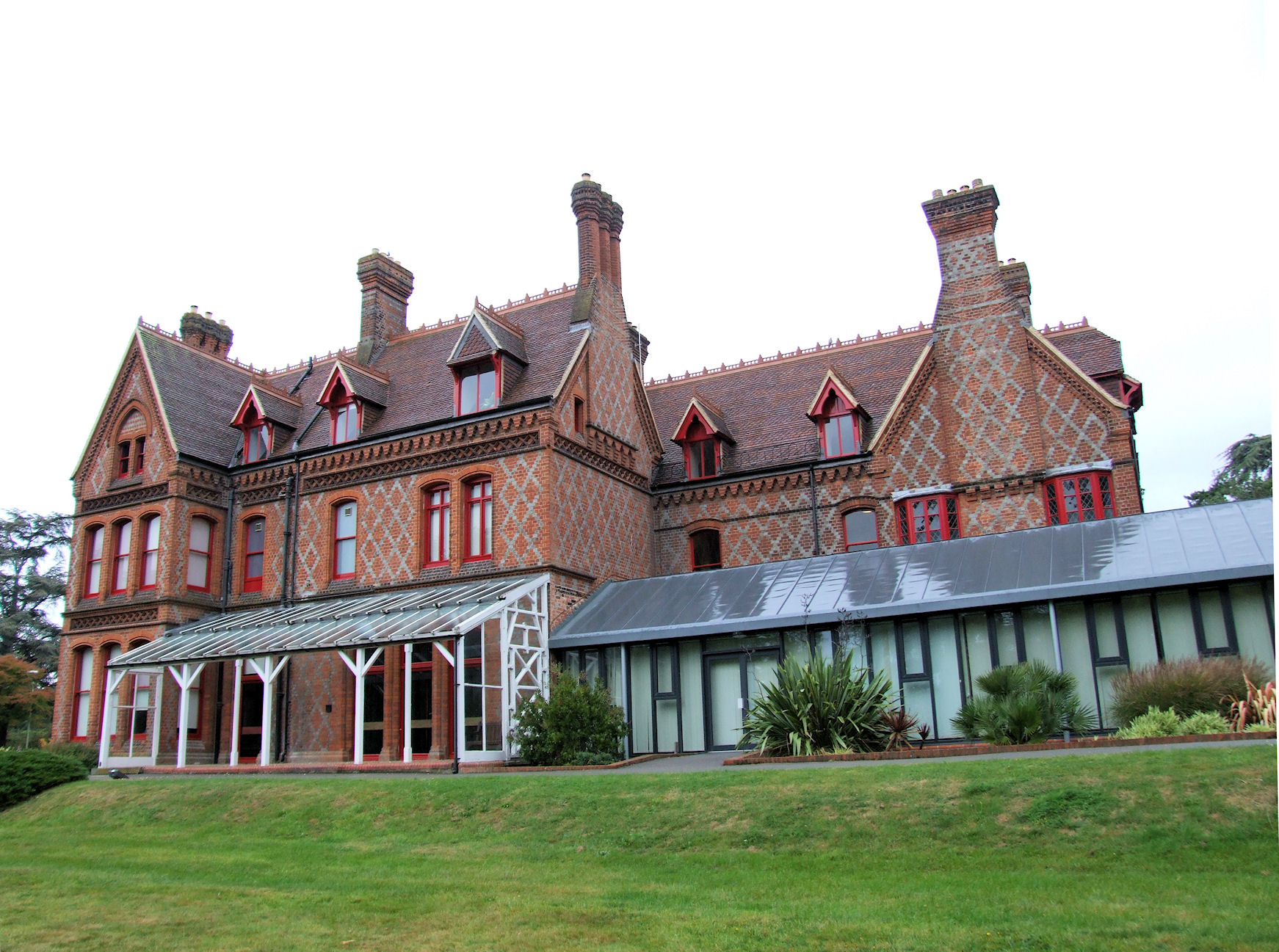
the south front of Foxhill House, on the right is the conservatory (a modern replacement), behind which is the servants' wing, the dining room opens to the veranda, with the drawing room to the left, the upper floor is the family bedrooms and on the right the nursery, servants' bedrooms are in the attic

From the late 1860s, Waterhouse lived in Reading, Berkshire, and was responsible for several significant buildings there. These included, alterations to and a new stable block (1861–62) at his parents' home Whiteknights House, his own residences of Foxhill House (1867–68) both houses are now used by University of Reading. Waterhouse built a new country house for himself at Yattendon, called Yattendon Court (1877–78), demolished c.1926. Foxhill House was built with the main block containing the hall, morning room, drawing room and dining room, upstairs were five bedrooms, two dressing rooms and a night and day nursery. The servants wing projected to the east, it was hidden by a conservatory to its south. There was an attached stable yard with servants bedrooms above the coach house. Yattendon Court was a larger house, built from red brick with terracotta decoration, with light coloured stone mouldings, with a tile roof. It was in an early Tudor style with some Gothic details. There was a four storey battlemented tower on the west side, there were gables and prominent chimney stacks. The house was sited on knoll 400 feet above sea level, to provide good views. The house was entered from a porch to the north, leading to the large hall, the drawing room and library were to its south, a corridor stretched east of the hall. The rooms laid out to the south of the corridor were the dining room and school room, with the butler's pantry and housekeeper's room to the north. The kitchen, servants' hall and scullery were in a block to the east. there were separate, stables, coach house, laundry and kitchen garden. The landscaping of the grounds was carried out by Edward Milner from 1878, and included planting 3,000 trees, evergreens and rhododendrons, a small lake was also created and a rose garden was laid out. The cost of Yattendon was £11,865.

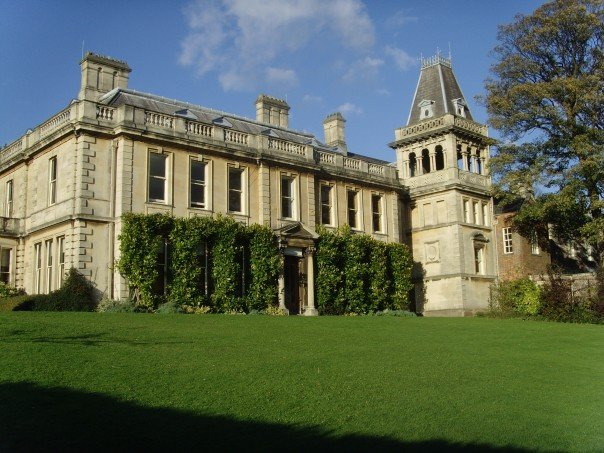
Goldney Hall, Bristol, Gloucestershire (1865–68), Italianate in style, a style rarely used by Waterhouse, though popular at the time, but he designed a French Renaissance style roof to the tower, clad in Bath stone

Goldney Hall (1865–68), Clifton, Bristol, was built for Lewis Fry a member of the chocolate manufacturing Fry family. It is a suburban house, but with large gardens. It is in Italianate style one rarely used by Waterhouse, he refaced the existing eighteenth-century house in Bath stone, adding the tower with its belvedere, also entrance cloister and new main staircase, plus a new kitchen wing in brick. The cost was £12,850. The builders were J. & J. Foster; ceramic tiles were provided by W. Godwin; the stained glass was made by Heaton Butler & Bayne; the panelling in the drawing room was executed by Howard & Son; chimneypieces in the hall were by Benham & Co., in the staircase hall by W.H. Burke & Co. and the oak chimneypieces used in other rooms were by W. Farmer; decoration was by J. Hankins; decorative iron work was by Hart Son Peard & Co. and F.A. Skidmore & Co.; the decorative plasterwork was executed by J.W. Hindshaw. The clerk of works was Alexander Gray.

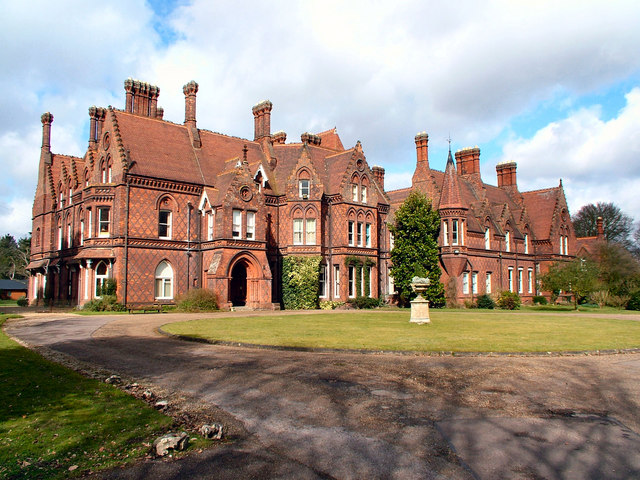
Easneye Park, Stanstead Abbots, Hertfordshire (1866) Tudor, with bright red brick with dark brick diaper patterns, note the brick chimneys, based on those at Hampton Court Palace

Easneye Park (1866) near Stanstead Abbotts, Hertfordshire, was a country house built for Thomas Fowell Buxton, a large red brick in early Tudor style, with typical diaper work and terracotta decoration with crow-stepped gable and tiled roof the chimneys are base on those at Hampton Court Palace. The commission included the mansion, stables and entrance lodge. The building cost £32,800. The main block of the house is entered from a porch on the east front, the large entrance hall has to the west the drawing room of two sections, to the south is the study and school room. There is a wing to the north, this is set slightly to the east of the main block, it contains the dining room, gun room, butler's pantry. Another wing, also slightly to the east, contains the housekeeper's room and kitchen. The builder was William Brass, central heating and ventilation was by G.N. Haden; the modelling of the terracotta and carving on the building was by Farmer & Brindley; the ceramic tiles were made by W.B. Simpson; stained glass windows were by Heaton Butler & Bayne and F.T. Odell; the chimneypieces were manufactured by the Lizard Serpentine Co. and W.H. Burke; fittings were made by W. Wilson; decorative iron work was by Hart Son Peard & Co., R. Jones and Lester & Hodkinson; the plaster ceiling roses were executed by J.W. Hindshaw; advice on the garden design was given by Robert Marnock.

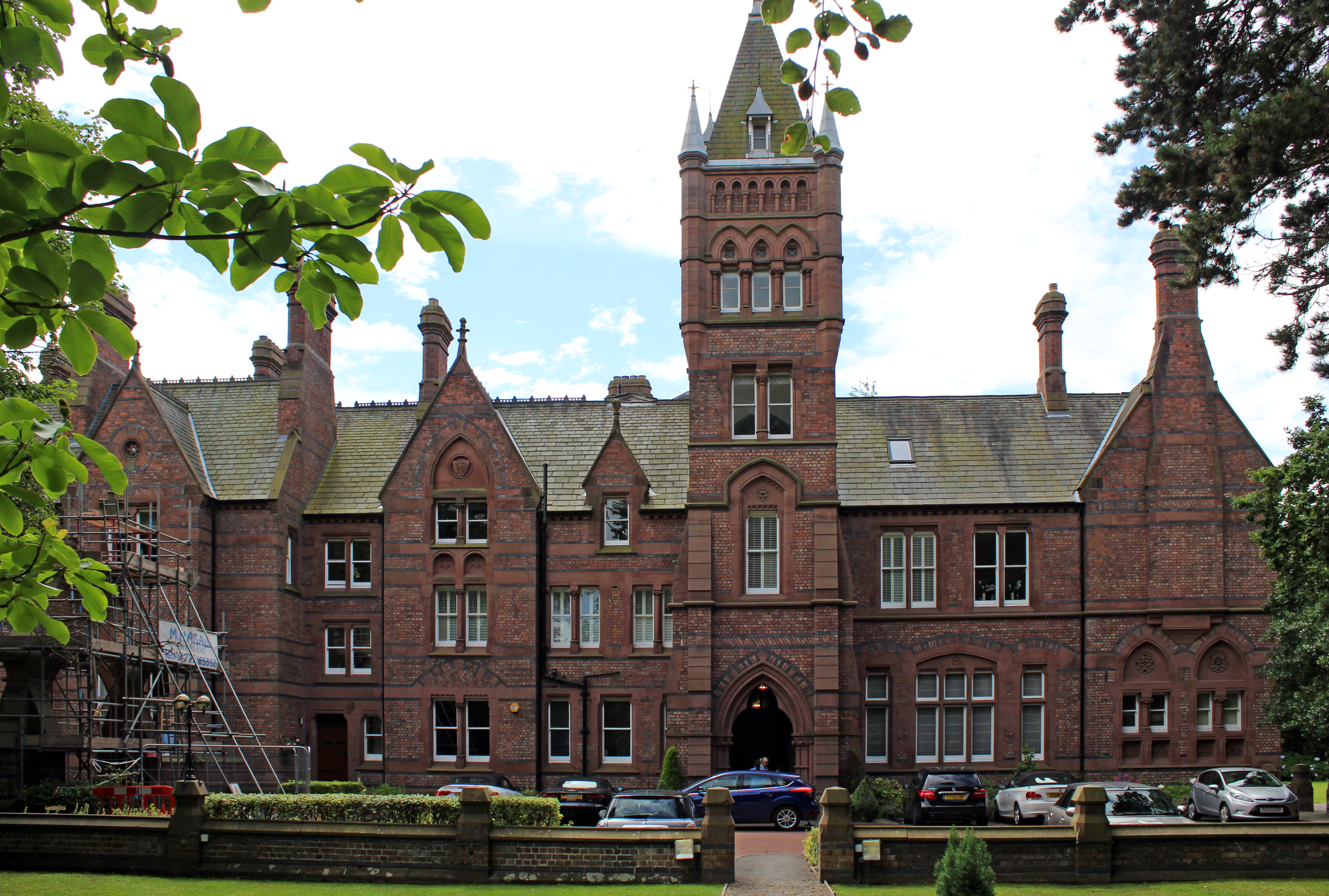
Allerton Priory, Allerton, Liverpool (1868-76) French Gothic with brick and stone dressings and a very characteristic Waterhouse tower, more often found on public buildings

Allerton Priory a large house was designed by Waterhouse in 1866 and built (1868–71), the picture gallery was added in (1872–76). Located in the Liverpool suburb of Allerton. It is built from brick with sandstone dressings and in a French Gothic style, with the distinctive four storey tower with its steep pyramidal roof surrounded by four tourelles rising above the entrance porch. Also by Waterhouse is the large entrance lodge to the extensive grounds and a vinery. The building was built for John Grant Morris, a colliery owner, who served as Lord Mayor of Liverpool (1866–67). It cost of £16,500 (roughly £1,900,000 in 2019) to build, the work of (1872–76) cost about £5,000. The building is L-shaped in plan, the servants wing sticking out from the main block. The large single storey picture gallery housed the owners extensive collection of contemporary British art and made the building's plan U-shaped. The main rooms were the long entrance hall entered from the porch on the north front, around which are the billiards room, study, smoking room, library, drawing room and dining room with its separate serving room. There is also a schoolroom and a butler's pantry within the block. The servants wing contains the kitchen, servants' hall and housekeeper's room. The builders were Holme & Nicol; the heating and ventilation system was by G.N. Haden; the stone carving on the building was executed by Farmer & Brindley; decorative ceramic tiles were manufactured by W. Godwin and L. Oppenheimer; the stained glass windows were made by Heaton Butler & Bayne, R.D. Edmundson and F.T. Odell; the chimneypieces were supplied by the Lizard Serpentine Co., W.H. Burke and W. Wilson, the iron grates were made by Hart Son Peard & Co. and D.O. Boyd; the fittings and furniture was made by Gillows of Lancaster and London; the decorative iron work was by R. Jones, F.A. Skidmore and Lester & Hodkinson; the plaster ceiling roses were executed by J.W. Hindshaw. The clerk of works was J. Dickson.

Another large country house is Blackmoor House, in Blackmoor, Hampshire, built in stages around an existing farm house, they were 1865, (1866–67), (1868–73) and (1882–83). Gothic in style and built of stone with a tiled roof. The commission included stables, lodges gardens and furniture. It was built for Roundell Palmer. Dryderdale Hall (1871–72), near Hamsterley, mansion, stables and lodge, stone in the style of Scottish baronial architecture, built for Alfred Backhouse. Coodham (1872–79), Kilmarnock, a large house with chapel, music room and conservatory, lodge, cottages and farm buildings for William Houldsworth. For Lt-Col James Fenton Greenall, Waterhouse designed Lingholm, Keswick, a large stone house with slate roof. In Hurworth-on-Tees he designed Hurworth Grange (1873–75), now the Hurworth Grange Community Centre, which Alfred Backhouse had commissioned as a wedding gift for his nephew, James E. Backhouse, large brick house with stone dressing. Waterhouse was commissioned (1873–76) by Henry Pease (MP), to extended his existing mansion Pierrmont in Darlington, adding a new wing and conservatory, redecorated the hall, and built the gatehouse and the prominent clock tower. Silwood Park, Sunninghill, Berkshire (1876–79), built for Charles P. Stewart was a large mansion, with double height great hall, red brick with stone dressings. Rockcliffe, Kirkcudbrightshire, Baron's Craig (1879), granite faced house with rubble stone walls and dressed stone with battlemented tower, for Christopher Morris. Crimplesham Hall (1880–82), Norfolk, built for John Grant Morris for his daughter Mrs A.T. Bagge, built from yellow brick and low pitched slate roofs, in a simplified classical style. East Thorpe House, Reading, built in 1880-82, house and stables of brick and terracotta for Alfred Palmer, it is now the Museum of English Rural Life.

=== Ecclesiastical buildings ===
Waterhouse was never a major church designer, but throughout his career he received commissions for churches and chapels. In 1865 Waterhouse was commissioned to rebuild the ruinous medieval parish church of St Martin's Brasted in Kent, only the original tower was kept, apart from a new north aisle the building was rebuilt on the old foundations, the south window in the tower was also new, Gothic in style, the windows are a mixture of geometrical and perpendicular tracery, it is built of stone with a tile roof. St Seiriol's parish church (1867–68), Penmaenmawr, Wales, is in the Early English Period style built from local granite with sandstone dressings and slate roof, the tower was added in 1885. The builder was H. Atkinson, heating system was by G.N. Haden, stained glass was by F.T. Odell, decorative iron work was by R. Jones, the fittings were made by Mark Foggett, the organ was made by Bevington and the font was carved by T.L. Carter. The church cost £3,610. He designed the Chapel (1873–74) for Reading Grammar School that he had designed in 1868 from red brick, it is Early English Gothic in style

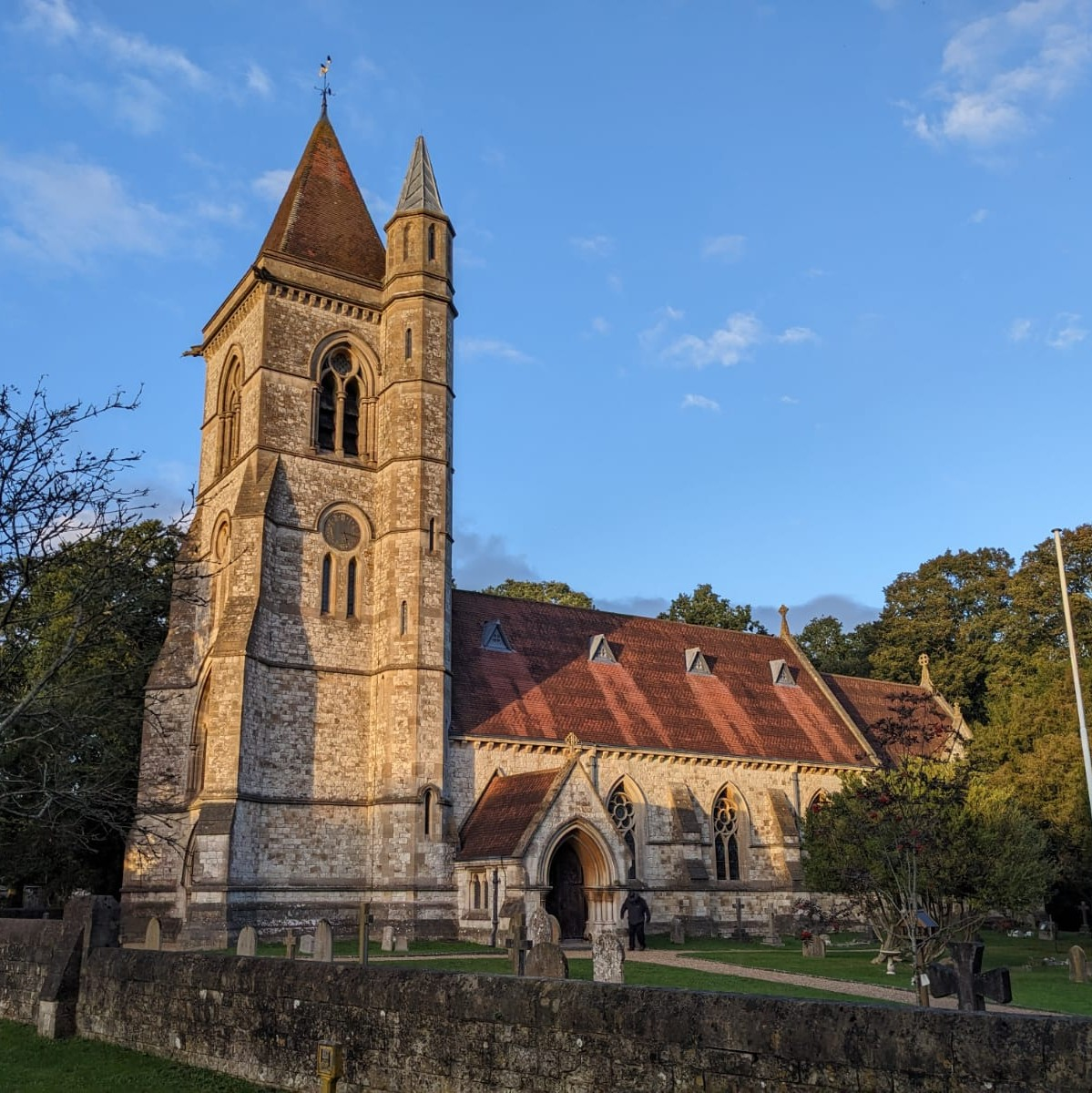
St Matthew's Church, Blackmoor, Hants

Another of Waterhouse's parish churches this time in Decorated Gothic is St Matthew's Blackmoor (1867–70), built of stone with tiled roofs. It was built for Roundell Palmer, 1st Earl of Selborne. The builder was Thomas Kemp; the heating system was by G.N. Haden; the stone carving was by Farmer & Brindley, ceramic floor tiles were by W. Godwin; the stained glass was made by Heaton Butler & Bayne and F.T. Odell; furnishings and fittings were manufactured by Christopher Prat and Heal & Sons; the decorative iron work was by Lester & Hodkinson and R. Jones; the grate in the vestry was by D.O. Boyd; the organ was manufactured by Bevington; the clock in the tower was made by E. White; the bells were cast by John Warner & Sons. The church cost £8,635.

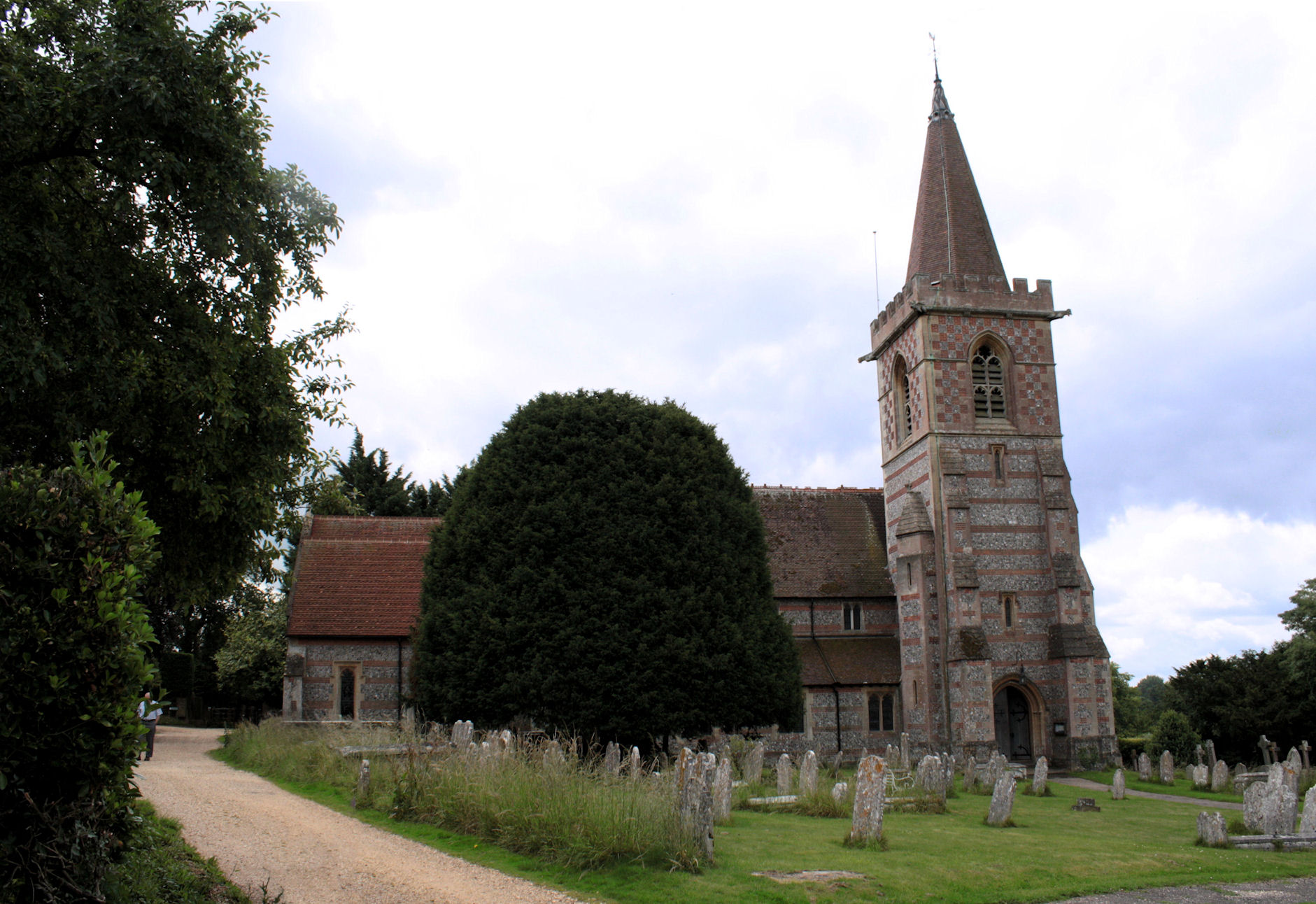
St Mary's parish church Twyford, Hampshire, from the north, this village church is very different in character to Waterhouse's town churches, there is an attempt to blend the style of the building to the vernacular architecture of the area by using local building materials

St Mary's Church of England parish church in Twyford, Hampshire (1876–78) is a village church it replaced the previous dilapidated medieval church. It was built in a decorated Gothic style, the roof is covered in red tiles and the walls are of knapped flint with bands of red brick. Showing similar patterning to the Natural History Museum and was designed at the same time. The columns in the nave and windows in the clerestory are from the old church and were incorporated into the building. The builders were Messers Dyer. Stained glass was made by Heaton Butler & Bayne and F.T. Odell, decorative iron work was by Hart Son Peard &Co., ceramic floor tiles were made by W. Godwin and the heating system was by G.N. Haden. Thomas Fairbairn donated £1,000 towards the cost of the building his wife gave £500, a local woman Mrs Waddington gave £700 to build the spire to an amended design, originally it was to be much taller and built from stone at a cost of £2,000. The spire as built is of wood with a tile covering. The nave is of five bays with aisles, the tower is in the north west corner of the nave, the chancel is of two bays with transepts, the vestry is on the east side of the north transept. The total cost of the building was £7,655.

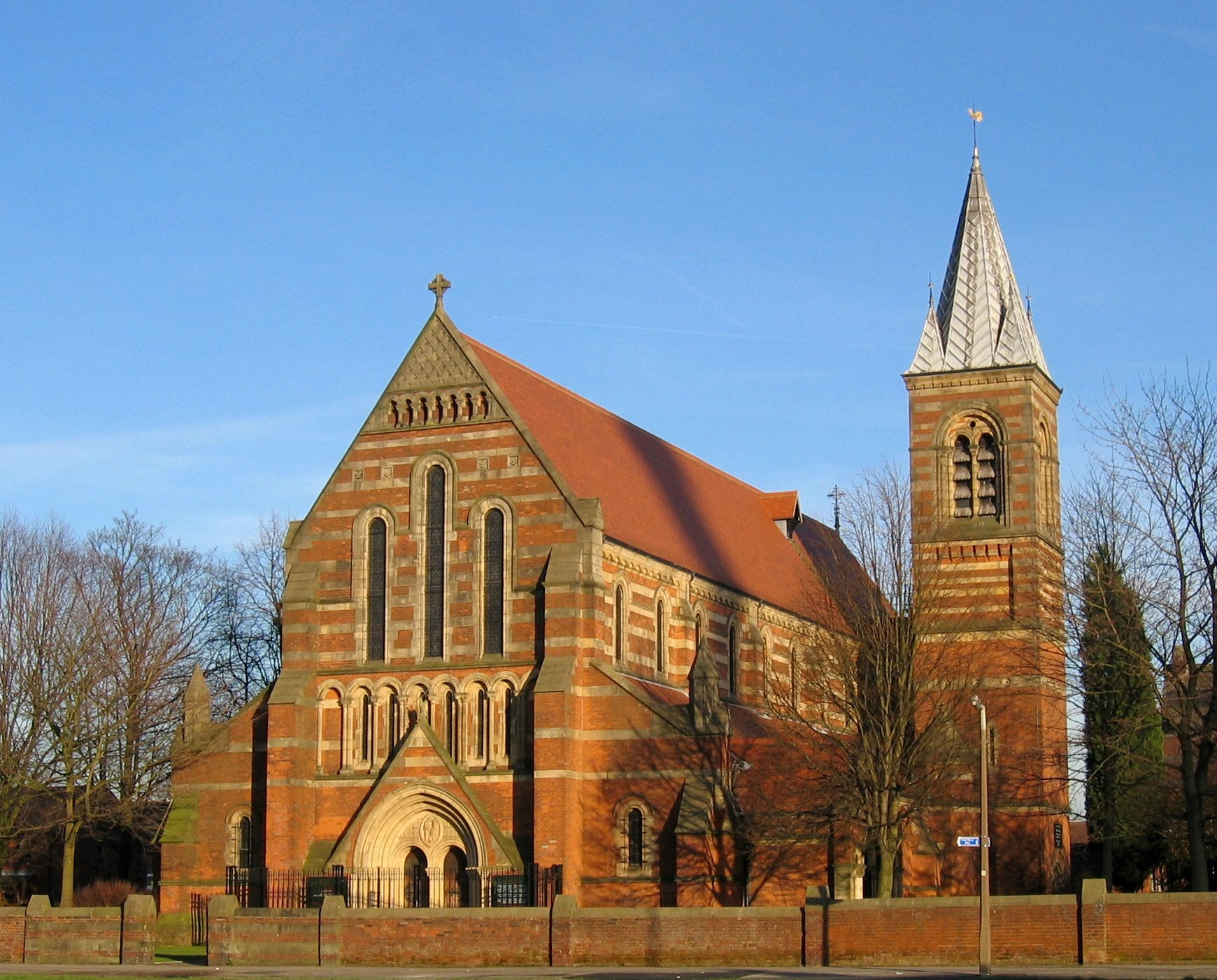
St Elizabeth's Church, Reddish, Stockport (1883–85), Romanesque, red brick with stone dressings, the plan is conventional for an English parish church

St Elisabeth's Church, Reddish (1883–85) is a Church of England parish church and was designed for William Houldsworth, for whom Waterhouse designed other buildings in the area all part of Houldsworth Model Village. The church is of red brick with stone dressings, it is Romanesque in style. The chancel which is vaulted of three bays, the Lady Chapel to the south of the chancel is also vaulted, both have an apse. The nave has aisles and is of four bays, there is a south porch leading to the western bay of the nave, the foursquare bell tower rises from just south of the chancel, it has a short lead-covered spire with four pyramidal lead pinnacles around its corners. The bells were cast by John Taylor & Co. The builders were for the foundation C.H. Normanton, the superstructure was built by William Southern. The stained glass in the clerestory was designed by Frederic Shields and made by Heaton Butler & Bayne, the rest of the stained glass was to Waterhouse's design and was executed by F.T. Odell. Internal decoration was executed by Watts & Co. The polished granite for the monolithic nave columns was provided by G & J Jenning. The stone carving was by Thomas Earp that included the marble and alabaster rood screen that supports four marble statues of the Four Evangelists, reredos and sedilia. The sanctuary walls are clad in pale green and grey marbles, this and the other marble work was provided by W.H. Burke. Ceramic tiles used to pave the floor were by W. Godwin. The decorative ironwork including the screens separating the Lady Chapel and the organ built by William Hill & Sons, from the chancel was made by Hart Son Peard & Co. and R, Jones. The heating system was provided by G.N. Haden. Waterhouse also designed the communion-plate, altar-frontal and altar cross. The church cost £19,425 (approx £2,230,000 in 2019), this is one of Waterhouse's finest and his most lavishly decorated church.

Lyndhurst Road Congregational Church (1883–84), Camden, originally built for the Congregational church, is unusual as the body of the church is hexagonal built in purple brick with red brick and terracotta dressings in a Romanesque style. The builders were J. Parnell & Son; structural steel work was by W.H. Lindsay, heating and ventilation was by D.O. Boyd; the modelling of the terracotta decoration was by Farmer & Brindley; ceramic tiles were by Craven Dunnill & Co., and the decorative iron work was made by Hart Son Peard & Co. and R. Jones. The church cost £15,970 to build. The building is now the Air Lyndhurst complex of recording studios.

The former King's Weigh House chapel (1889–90) in Mayfair, another Congregational church, is built from red brick and orange terracotta, it has an oval nave and a tower in the south-west corner, built in a Romanesque style. The builders were John Shillitoe & Son, the structural steel work was by A. Handyside & Co., heating and ventilation was by G.N. Haden, the ceramic tiles were manufactured by Craven Dunnill & Co., faience tiling was by Burmantofts, and decorative ironwork by Hart Son Peard & Co.. The cost was £26,495.

=== Hospital buildings ===
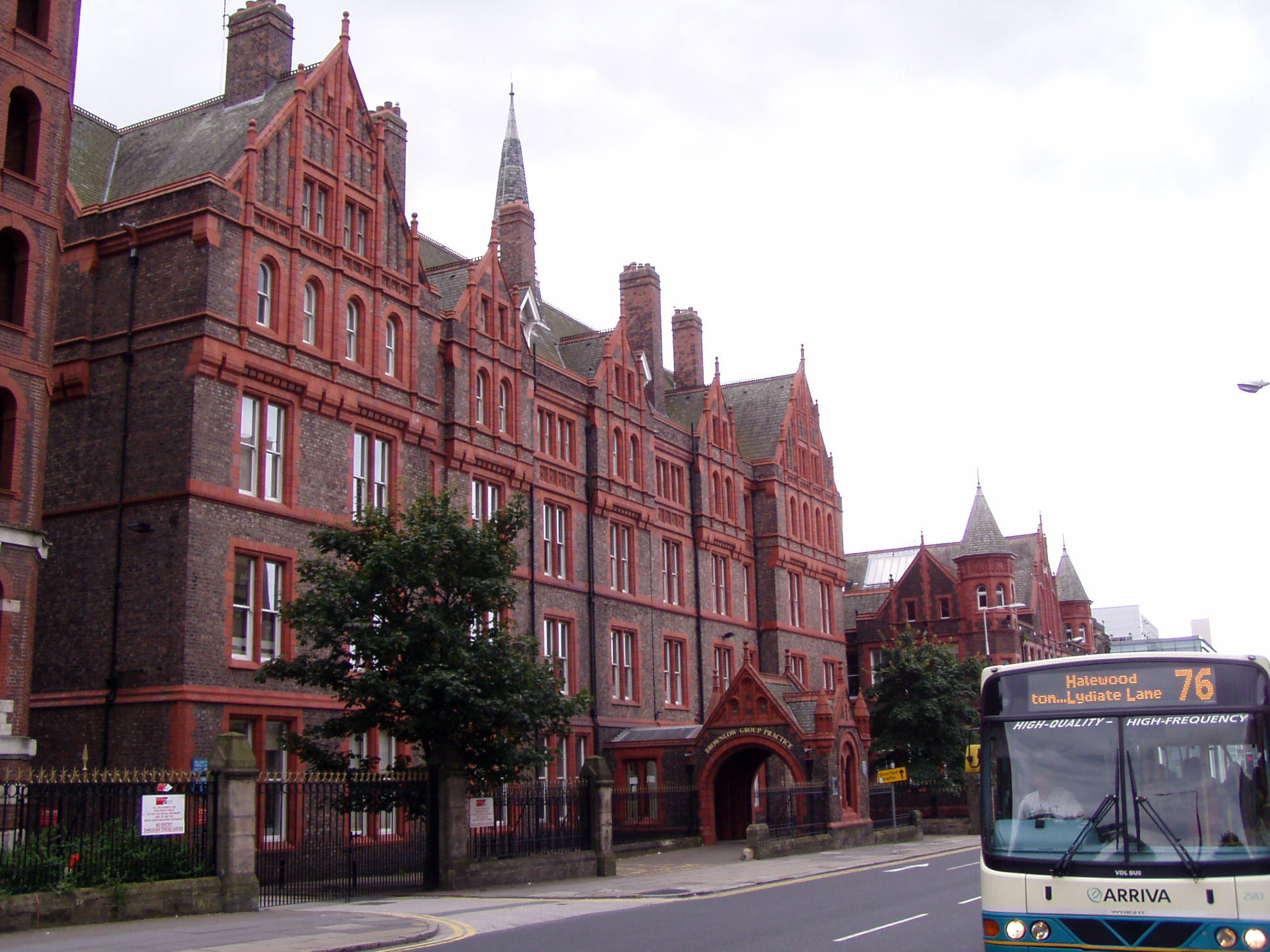
The main administration block, Liverpool Royal Infirmary, show the restrained decoration, in red terracotta and dark brick, (1886–92), note the porte-cochere sheltering the main entrance to protect patients from inclement weather

Waterhouse's hospital designs all date from later in his career. These include: the Lister Institute of Preventive Medicine in Chelsea (1898–1903); the Royal Alexandra Hospital in Rhyl (1899–1902); added the Jubilee Wing to Nottingham General Hospital (1900); Saint Mary's Hospital, Manchester (1899–1901). Architecturally the two most important of his hospitals were Liverpool Royal Infirmary and University College Hospital London.

Liverpool Royal Infirmary (1886–92) was Waterhouse's largest hospital, the design was three rectangular medical wards projecting south linked by a corridor to their north, they have loggias on their southern end, to the north of the spine corridor at each end are two circular surgical wards, the administration block is on the northern edge of the site along Pembroke Place is linked by a corridor, with the chapel to one side to the spine corridor. The style of the building is neo-Romanesque with grey brick walls and dressings in red Ruabon terracotta. The interiors use white and grey glazed bricks with terrazzo floors, lacking any mouldings therefore easy to keep clean. The chapel has bright coloured faience work and tiling by Burmantofts Pottery. The Nightingale ward plan was used, women were on the first floor, the men on the second floor. The building also incorporated a medical school, linked to the University of Liverpool and a nurses' home. The cost of the building was £123,500 (approx £15,500,000 in 2019). The main building contractor was Holme & Green; the structural steel was by W.H. Lindsay & Co.; heating and ventilation by W.W. Phipson; terracotta was provided by J.C. Edwards the modelling of the terracotta was by Farmer & Brindley; tiles were provided by Johnson & Co. and Craven Dunhill & Co.; faience was by Burmantofts; chimneypieces were provided by J & H Patterson & Co., Blackmore & Co. and the Hopton Wood Co.; iron work was by W.H. Peake & Co. and Hart Son Peard & Co. The hospital closed in 1978 and is now used by the University of Liverpool.

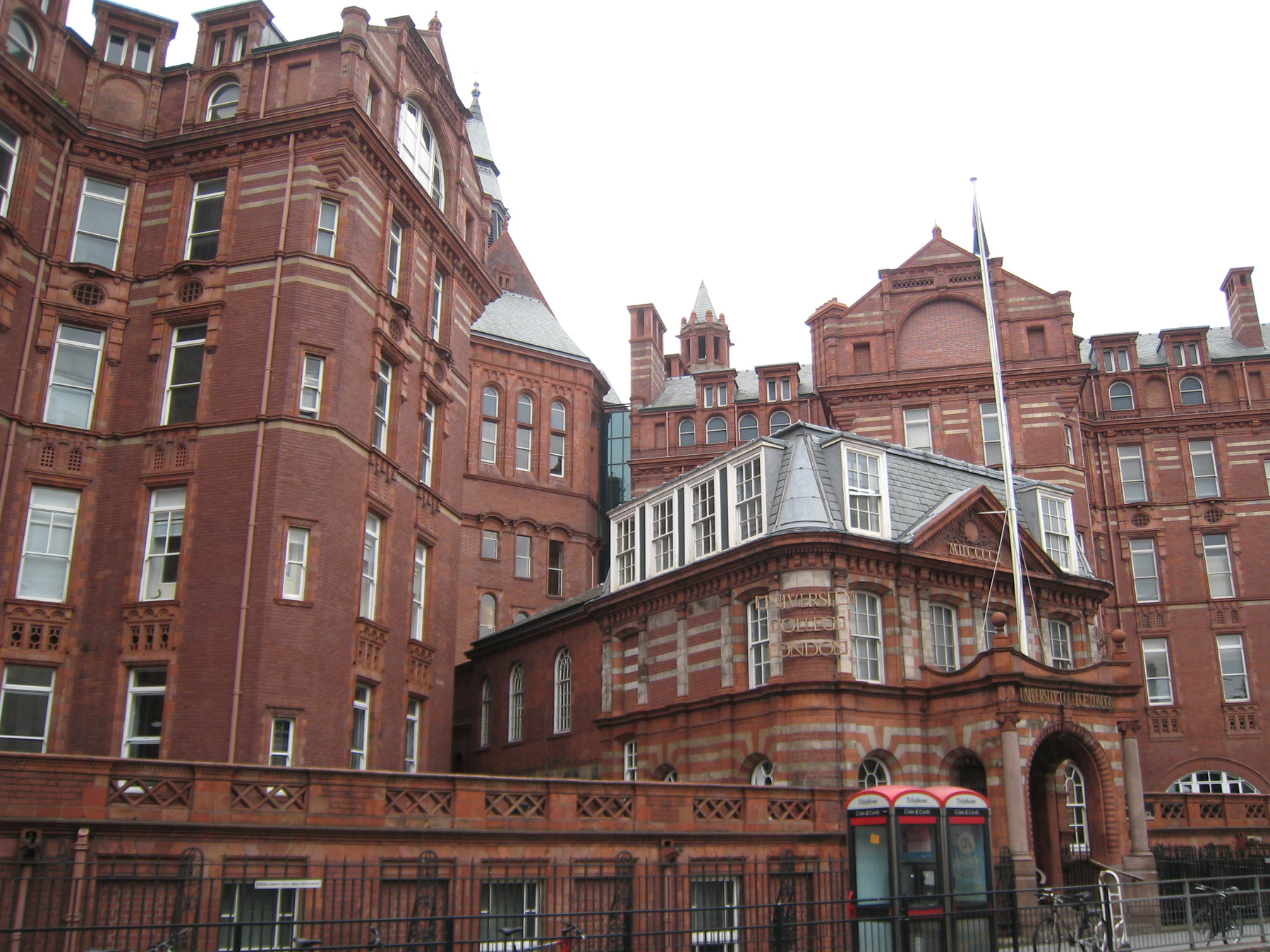
Former University College Hospital, London (1894–1903) showing the main entrance and Waterhouse's radical new design for the hospital

Waterhouse's other major hospital is what is now University College London's Cruciform Building (1894–1903), the former site of University College Hospital; whereas Liverpool Royal Infirmary was a fairly conventional layout for a Victorian hospital University College Hospital would be a radical departure. The site was roughly square, but cramped, in order to maximise the building's size but ensure light and air to the wards Waterhouse came up with the X-plan design sitting diagonally across the site, and sitting on a two-storey high building. The lower two floors one of which is a semi-basement, contained the outpatients' department, waiting rooms, and casualty wards. The central tower contained the lifts, main staircase and operating theatres. The four upper stories consist of three wings that contained wards, the fourth was the nurses' home. The toilets and bathrooms were located at the far end of each wing. The wards contained 24 beds, again like Liverpool on the Nightingale Ward principal. A total of nearly three hundred beds. It was probably the world's first vertically planned hospital. Built of red brick and terracotta with a few thin bands of stone, with some classical details especially around the main entrance on Gower Street facing University College. It cost £200,000 (approx £24,600,000 in 2019) and was paid for by John Blundell Maple as a gift. The main building contractor was Thomas Holloway; structural steelwork was by A. Handyside & Co.; heating and ventilation was by G.N. Haden and Ashwell & Nesbitt; furniture and fittings were provided by Maple & Co.

=== Educational buildings ===
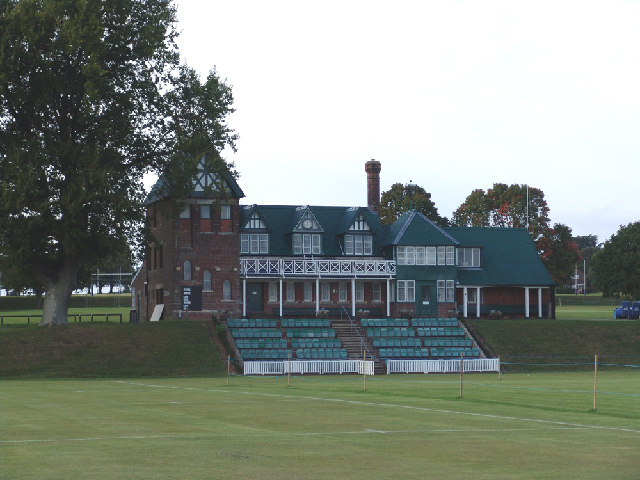
Cricket Pavilion, Marlborough College (1872-73) an example of one of Waterhouse's smaller buildings, he rarely designed buildings for sport, even so much thought has gone into it, the veranda and balcony providing excellent views of the pitch, the easy-going simplicity of the design suits its purpose

Many of Waterhouse's commissions for educational buildings involved multi-phase development, sometimes over several decades. This is so of both the Northern universities and Oxford and Cambridge colleges. His school buildings, smaller and usually new-built were more usually built in a single phase.

==== School buildings ====
Waterhouse designed a few school buildings. The Cricket Pavilion at Marlborough College has half-timbered gables, red brick and a wooden veranda. Middlesbrough High School (1873–77) redbrick with stone dressing, two storeys with dormer attic and tower. City and Guilds of London Institute in London's Exhibition Road (1881–86), red brick and terracotta, it was an example of Queen Anne style architecture, cost £88,120 (approx £10,100,000 in 2019), demolished 1962. In Yorkshire Waterhouse designed (1887–89) Guisborough Grammar School, now Prior Pursglove and Stockton Sixth Form College, this consisted of the Master's House, school itself, of grey stone ground floor, the upper floor of red brick with yellow terracotta and slate roof, there were further alterations in 1897. At Leighton Park School in Reading, Waterhouse designed new dormitories and classrooms and extended the dining room (1890–91), then (1892–95) a new sanatorium and boarding house Grove House. St Margaret's School, Bushey (1894), built to educate the orphans of Anglican clergy, included the school building, chapel and entrance lodge, built of brick, cost £34,325 (approx £4,150,000 in 2019).

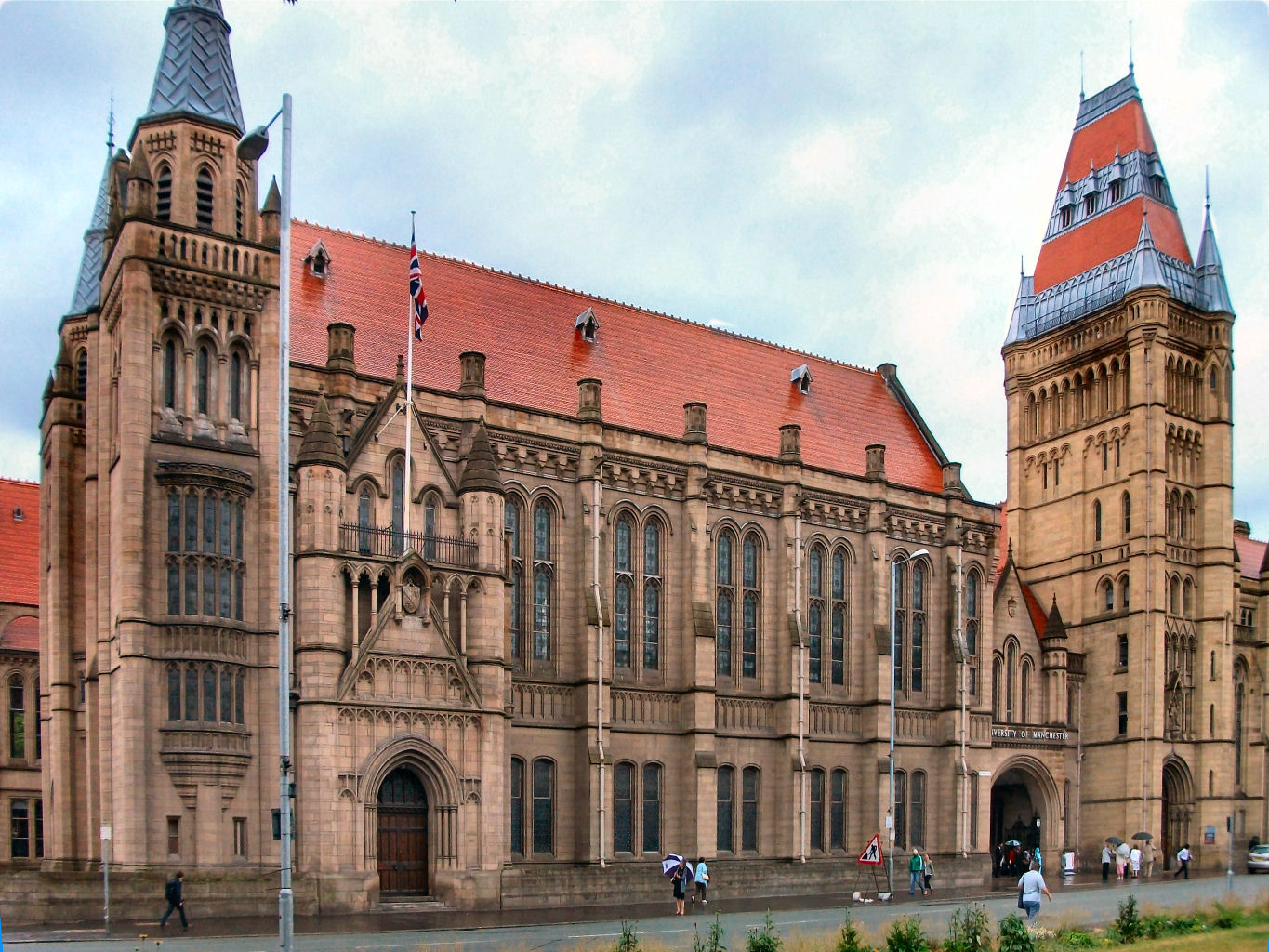
Whitworth Hall, University of Manchester (1898–1902) plain stone, with red tile roofs with prominent areas of lead, as with all three universities Waterhouse created one of his typical skylines of turrets and steep roofs, show the continuing influence of French Gothic at the end of his career, the walls are more English Perpendicular in style

Another educational building by Waterhouse is his large Reading Grammar School (1868–72), that consists of a long range of buildings, consisting of the school rooms, hall, masters' houses. In style the school is Gothic, built of red brick and terracotta. It cost to build £19,709 (approx £2,100,000 in 2019). The main building contractor was J. Parnell & Sons; heating and ventilation was by D.O. Boyd; stone carving was by Farmer & Brindley; ceramic tiles were provided by R.M. Taylor; stained glass was made by F.T. Odell; chimneypieces were made by Thomas Harrison; furniture and fittings were manufactured by H. Capel; iron work was made by R. Jones; plaster ceiling roses were by J.W. Hindshaw; the bells were cast by J. Warner & Co.

St Paul's School in Hammersmith (1881–1884; demolished 1968), built for the Worshipful Company of Mercers, Gothic, in dark brick and terracotta, with slate roof. In consisted of a master's house, caretakers lodge and gazebo, surrounding walls matching school, this was Waterhouse's largest school, with 1000 pupils, the building of three floors plus dormers and basement, it had an E-plan layout. The main facade to the north was symmetrical, with the hall and two three-storey wings of classrooms projecting south in an asymmetrical composition. It cost £105,735 to build (approx £12,150,000 in 2019). The main building contractor was J. Parnell & Sons; structural steelwork was by W.H. Lindsay & Co. and J.S. Bergheim; heating and ventilation was provided by G.N. Haden and D.O. Boyd; modelling of terracotta was by Farmer & Brindley; granite stonework was provided by G. & J. Fenning; ceramic tiles were manufactured by Craven, Dunhill & Co.; window glass was provided by F.T. Odell; chimneypieces were by W.H. Burke and the Hopton Wood Stone Co.; furniture and fittings were provided by Maple & Co. and the North of England School Furniture Co.; ironwork was by Hart Son Peard & Co. and R. Jones; the main clock was by Gillett & Bland. the clerk of works was T.M. Rickman

==== Northern universities ====
Waterhouse was to design three northern English universities, Manchester, Leeds and Liverpool, all would be in the Gothic style. All three would form The Victoria University.

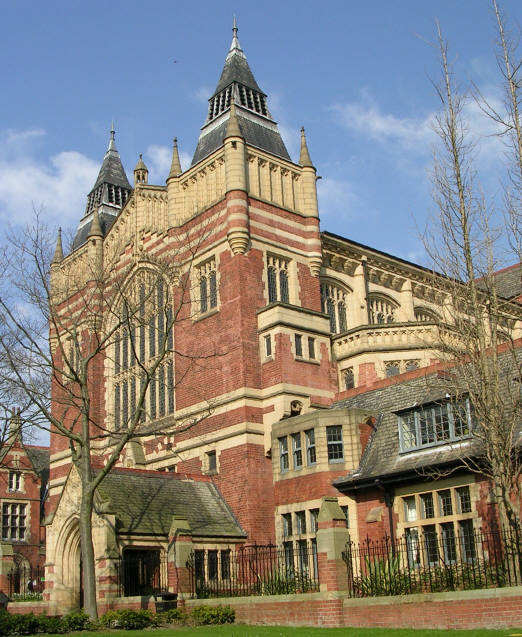
Exterior Great Hall, Yorkshire College, now University of Leeds (1892) like his work at Manchester showing the influence of English Perpendicular Gothic as well as French Gothic, the walls are red brick with yellow stone

What is now Manchester University began as Owens College later Victoria University of Manchester, for which the first buildings by Waterhouse were erected between 1869 and 1875. This first phase of 1869 was E-shaped in plan. Extensions followed, first the medical school (1882–83). The main facade behind which was the Council Room approached by a dramatic curved staircase, the museum lined Oxford Road, this being stone, brick with stone dressings was used for the earlier stages (1884–88), then the extensions to the engineering laboratory (1886–88). The medical school was again extended in (1891–96). The Schorlemmer Laboratory was built (1894–96). The Library was built (1895). Then followed by Whitworth Hall named after the donor Joseph Whitworth and the entrance tower on Oxford Road (1898–1902). All the buildings formed what is known as Main Quadrangle.

The first phase of building was constructed by the firm of Thomas Clay; structural steel work was by J.S. Bergheim, fireproofing by Dennett & Co.; stone carving by Farmer & Brindley; heating and ventilation by G.N. Haden and D.O. Boyd; ceramic tiling by Craven Dunhill & Co.; mosaic flooring by Jesse Rust; stained Glass by R.B. Edmundson and F.T. Odell; chimneypieces by Hopton Wood Stone Co.; ironwork by Hart Son Peard & Co. and R. Jones; the furnishing and fittings were by Lamb and H. Chapel; the cost was £105,000. The (1882–83) was by building firm William Southern & Co.; fireproofing and the heating and ventilation were by the firms used in phase 1; Thomas Earp & Hobbs did the stone carving; this time only Hart Son Peard & Co. were responsible for the ironwork; decorative stonework was by Hopton Wood Stone Co; the cost was £12,980. The (1884–88) phase was by William Southern & Co; fireproofing and the heating and ventilation were by the firms used in phase 1; stone carving by Farmer & Brindley, Thomas Earp & Hobbs; ceramic tiles were by Craven Dunhill & Co.; faience by Burmantofts; chimneypieces by Hopton Wood Stone Co. and J. & H. Patterson; ironwork by Hart Son Peard & Co; the cost was £75,725. The (1886–88) extension was by W.W. Harrison, cost £2,230. The (1891–96) was by R. Neill; structural steelwork by A. Handyside & Co.; ironwork by Hart Son Peard & Co.; stonework by Hopton Wood Stone Co.; cost £40,830. The (1894–96) extension was by R. Neill; heating and ventilation by G.N. Haden; ironwork by Hart Son Peard & Co, the cost was £4,370. The (1896) extension was by Henry Vickers; structural steelwork by A. Handyside & Co.; heating and ventilation by J. Grundy; stone carving by Earp & Hobbs; ceramic tiles by D. Conway; mosaic flooring by J.F. Ebner; ironwork by Hart Son Peard & Co.; furnishing and decoration by Heighway & Sons; the cost was £17,565. The final phase (1898–1902) cost £36,350.

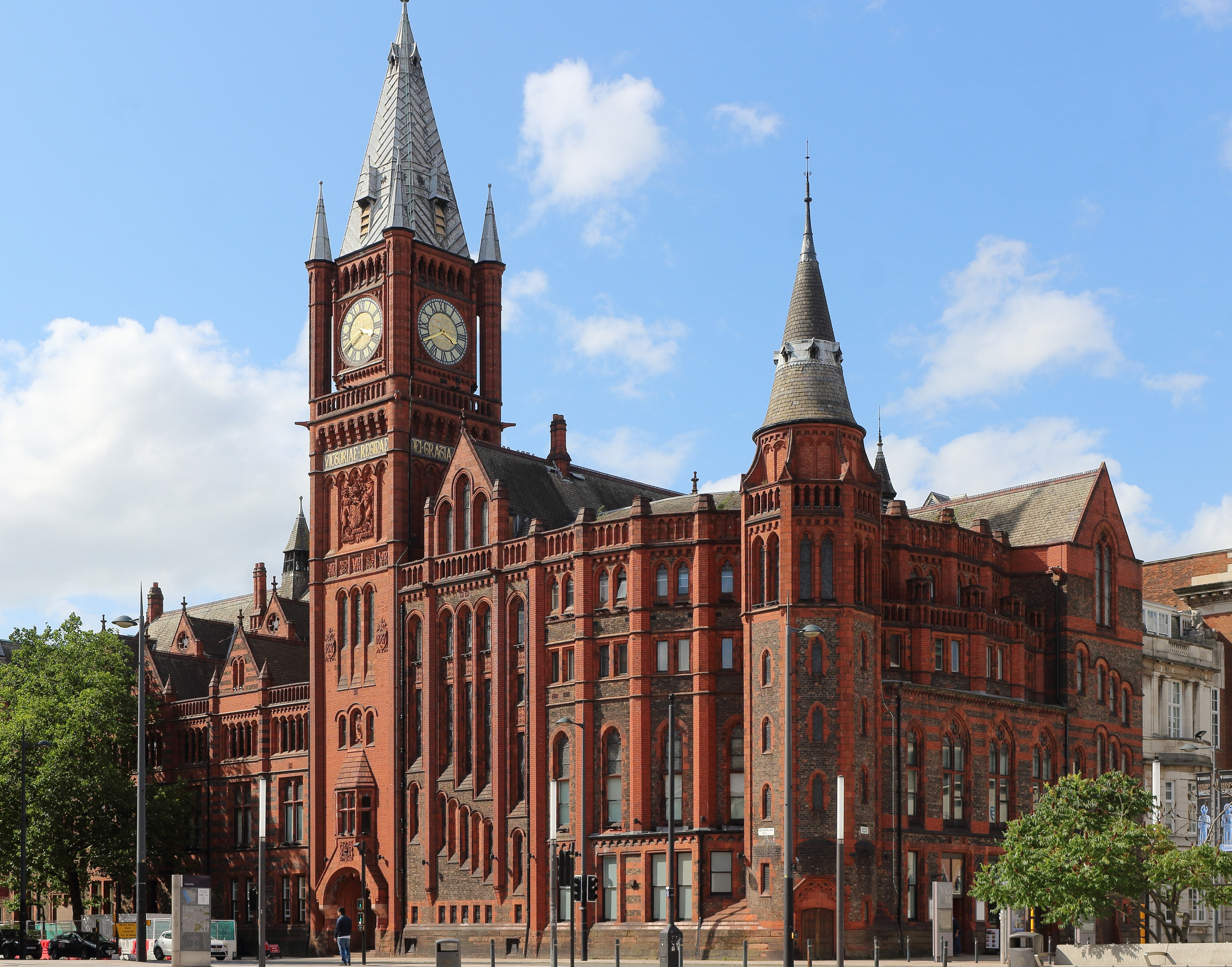
Victoria Building, red terracotta with darker brickwork, University of Liverpool (1888) the epitome of the Red brick university, this time Waterhouse mixed Early English Gothic with the French Gothic of the roofs

Waterhouse designed buildings from 1877 for Yorkshire College, that from 1904 became Leeds University. The first building then known as Clothworkers Building, largely paid for by The Worshipful Company of Clothworkers was built 1878-80, modest in size, of red brick with Spinkwell stone dressings, it contained a lecture theatre, museum and weaving sheds. The next phase of (1881–85) was partially funded by Sir Edward Baines, this was the three floor Baines Wing, gabled with a tower that has a pyramidal roof, it contained laboratories and classrooms. In (1884–86) the original Clothworkers Building was extended. Next the Engineering block (1885) of red brick with stone dressings and slate roof was built. The next phase was the Great Hall of (1890–95), of brick with stone bands and large perpendicular window in the gable end flanked by towers. The interior has an impressive staircase decorated with Burmantofts faience. The floors beneath the Great Hall originally contained a library and a refectory. In 1898 a new engine house and Leather Industries Laboratories was added.

The first phase of (1878–81) was built by Wooley & Sons; structural steelwork was by J.S. Bergheim and Fairburn, Kennedy & Naylor; heating and ventilation was by G.N. Haden and D.O. Boyd; stone carving by Farmer & Brindley; ceramic tiles were by W. Godwin; iron work by Hart Son Peard & Co. and R. Jones; chimneypieces by the Hopton Wood Stone Co.; cost £9,785. The (1881–85) phase was built by J. Wood & Sons; chimneypieces by the Hopton Wood Stone Co.; ironwork by Hart Son Peard & Co.; cost £34,135. The (1884–86) extension was by J. Wood & Sons; stone carving by Farmer & Brindley; iron work by Hart Son Peard & Co. and R. Jones; cost £8,830. The (1885) was built by J. Wood & Sons; heating and ventilation was by D.O. Boyd; chimneypieces by the Hopton Wood Stone Co.; iron work by Hart Son Peard & Co. and R. Jones; cost £6,420. The next phase (1890–95) was built by J. Wood & Sons; structural steelwork by A. Handyside & Co.; ceramic tiles by Craven Dunhill & Co.; faience work by Burmantofts; mosaic flooring by J.F. Ebner; chimneypieces by Hopton Wood Stone Co.; the furniture and fittings for the library by Carr Brother; ironwork by Hart Son Peard & Co.; cost £21,025. The (1898) phase was by J. Wood & Sons and Charles Myers; cost £9,640.

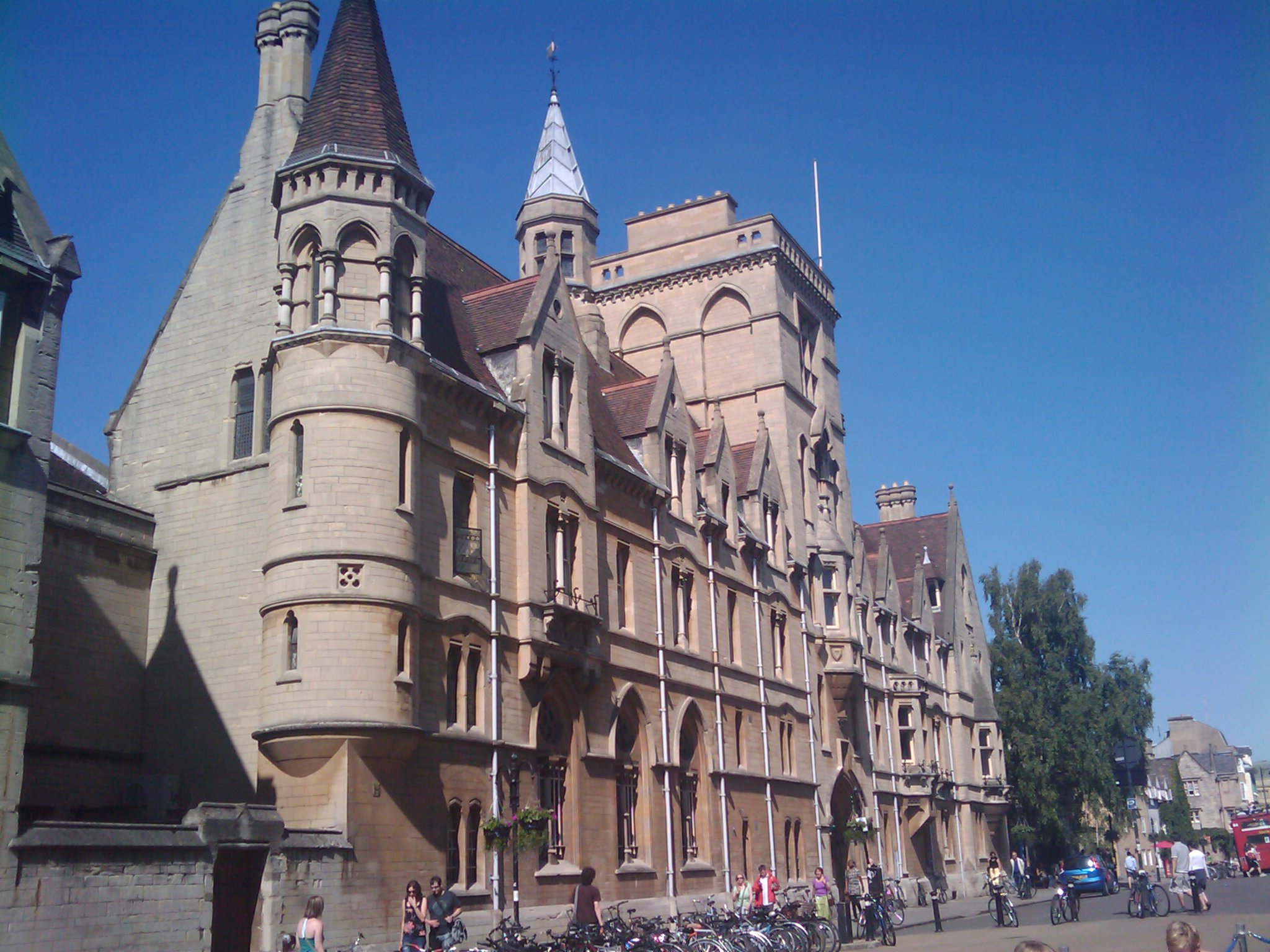
Balliol College. Oxford (1866–71) a High Victorian Gothic design, using the local stone and plain red tiled roof

Waterhouse began designing from 1881 buildings for what became University of Liverpool, with extensions to the former Liverpool Asylum to form University College. This would become his most extensive set of commissions for any of the three universities. The first new building was the chemistry laboratories (1884–87), followed by the Walker engineering laboratory built (1887–91). The Victoria Building and Jubilee Tower of red brick and terracotta from Ruabon and slate roofs, were constructed (1888–93) and contained the main teaching and administration facilities, that includes a large lecture theatre and library. The interiors including the main hall, corridors and main staircase are decorated using different coloured Burmantofts faience. The next phase was the Gossage Chemistry Laboratories, the medical School and the Thompson Yates laboratory (1895–1898) for the study of physiology and pathology. In (1899–1902) a new medical school and anatomy theatre and teaching rooms were built, this was Waterhouse's final work at the university.

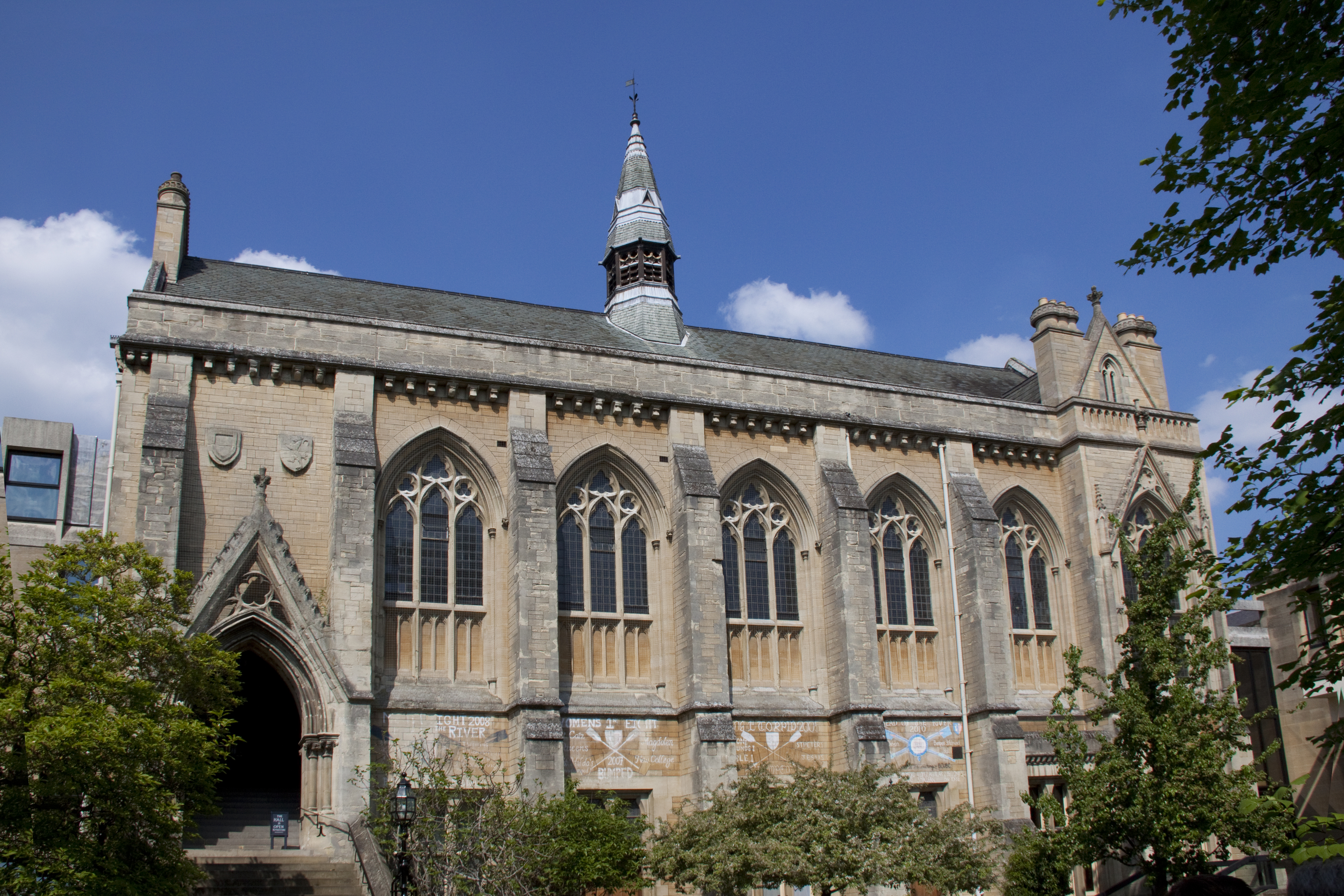
Hall, Balliol College, Oxford (1873–78) the Gothic style is less fussy than the earlier work at the college, the roofscape is especially restrained for Waterhouse, the style though Decorated Gothic has a Perpendicular feel especially the window aprons.

The work of (1881) was by building contractor William Tomkinson & Son; heating and ventilation by G.N. Haden and D.O. Boyd; ceramic tiles by D, Conway; chimneypieces by Blackmore & Nixon; ironwork by Hart Son Peard & Co.; furniture and furnishings by North of England Furnishing Co.; cost £4,540. The buildings of (1884–87) were built by Jones & Sons; heating and ventilation was by G.N. Haden; iron work by Hart Son Peard & Co. and R. Jones; stonework by Hopton Wood Stone Co.; cost £15,805. The phase of (1887–91) foundations were dug and laid by William Tomkinson & Sons; the superstructure was built by Brown & Backhouse; structural steelwork by W.H Lindsay & Co.; heating and ventilation was installed by G.N. Haden; the terracotta was manufactured by J.C. Edwards and modelled by Farmer & Brindley; ceramic tiles were manufactured by Craven Dunhill & Co.; the faience was manufactured by Burmantofts; the chimneypieces were made by J. & H. Patterson; ironwork was provided by Hart Son Peard & Co.; the cost was £13,845. The (1888–93) phase foundation were by Isaac Dilworth; the superstructure was constructed by Brown & Blackburn; structural steelwork by A. Handyside & Co.; modelling of the terracotta was by Farmer & Brindley and Earp & Hobbs; the faience work was provided by Burmantofts; mosaic flooring was by Jesse Rust; chimneypieces by Hopton Wood Stone Co. and J. & H. Patterson; ironwork was provided by Hart Son Peard & Co.; the cost was £47,580. The (1895–1898) phase was built by Jones & Sons apart from the Thompson Yates Laboratories by William Tomkinson & Son; structural steelwork by A. Handyside & Co.; heating and ventilation by G. N. Haden; the terracotta was manufactured by J.C. Edwards and modelled by Farmer & Brindley; ironwork was provided by Hart Son Peard & Co.; the faience work was provided by Burmantofts; mosaic flooring was by J.F. Ebner; furniture and fittings were made by Doulton, Jones & Son; the cost was £36,055. The final phase (1899–1902) was built by William Tomkinson at a cost of £12,740.

==== Oxford and Cambridge universities ====
Colleges at both the University of Oxford and the University of Cambridge would commission buildings from Waterhouse, indeed from 1865 to his retirement he was almost at continual work at one or both Universities. In (1865–67) the Cambridge Union Society commissioned a new debating hall, smoking room and caretaker's house, he returned twenty years later to double the size of the building with a new wing. At Balliol College, Oxford, his first work was the new Master's Lodge facing Broad Street and the main range L-shaped with a tower above the entrance to the college with a lecture hall (1866–71), in style French thirteenth-century Gothic. In (1873–78) he designed the new Great Hall. Charles Eastlake in 1872 described the style of the new buildings:

The new buildings for Balliol College, Oxford, for example show Mr Waterhouse kept up with the stream of advancing taste without losing that individuality of design which every true artist wished to retain. A Marked improvement is observable in the breadth and vigour with which this work is treated as compared with earlier examples of his skill. It contrasts strangely, indeed, with the old buildings by which it is surrounded, but as a matter of sentiment it may be questioned whether such a contrast is not an advantage when it is explained by a difference of style as well as of date, while as a matter of taste posterity alone will fairly judge between Oxford of the fifteenth and Oxford of the Nineteenth century.

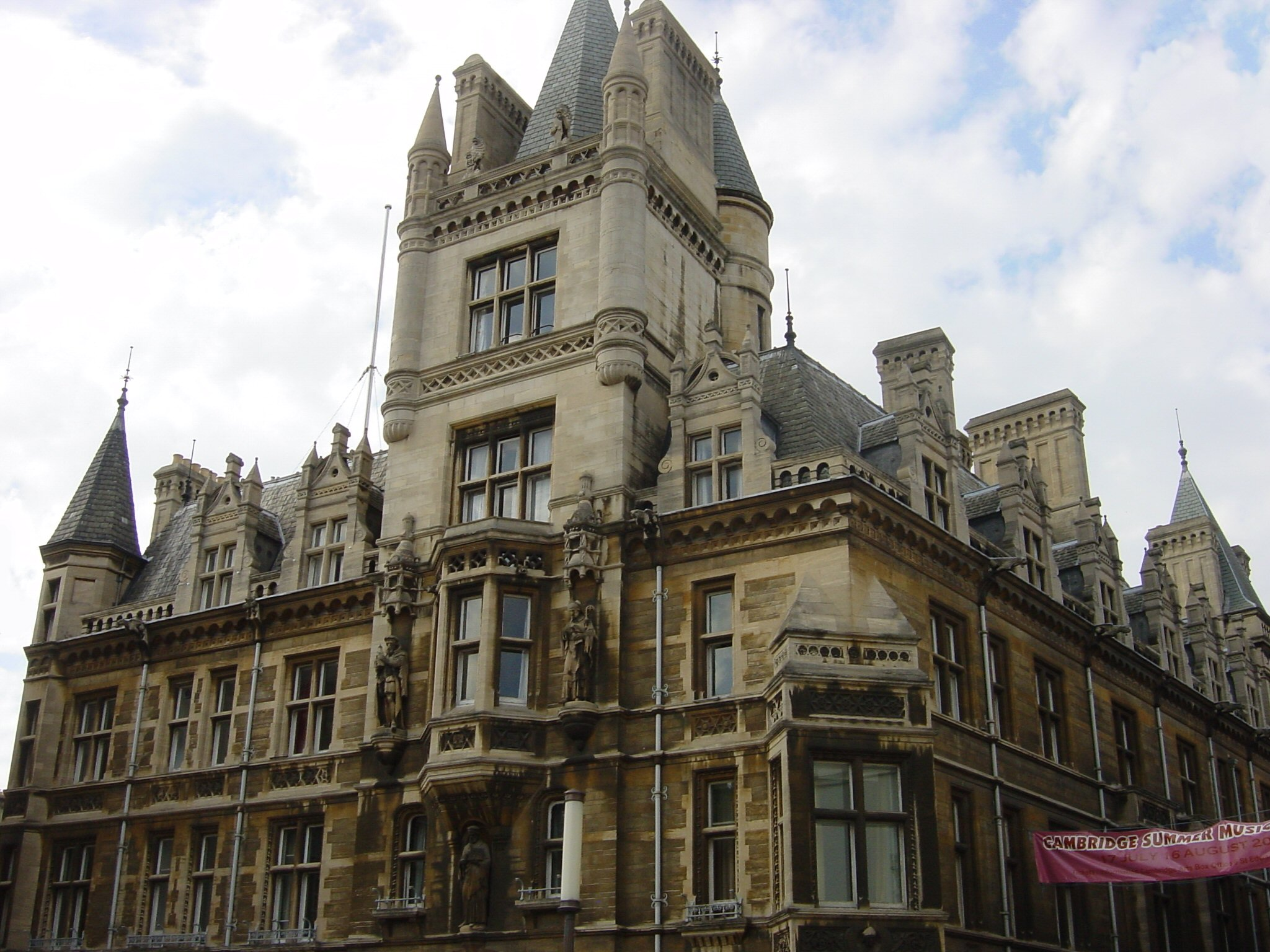
Gonville & Caius College, Cambridge (1868–70), Tree Court, Jacobethan but with French influenced roofs

In 1866 he was approached to rebuild and extended part of Gonville and Caius College, Cambridge, this is Tree Court built (1868–70), that provided sixty sets of rooms in a four-storey building. Building News magazine reviewed the design of Tree Court in the May 1869 issue:

Mr Waterhouse is constructing new buildings for Gonville and Caius College Cambridge in a curious and somewhat heavy Jacobitish [sic] style. The view shows two fronts; one next a narrow street of low gabled houses, in which he introduces square oriels to every student's room on the first floor; he has an oriel at one corner of the building one storey high, and at the corresponding corner three stories high. There is a general appearance of heaviness every way, his oriels and other projections are not sufficiently well corbelled out to relieve them from an appearance of giving way from the weight.....This is really a good picturesque design, and the detail is in character with that of the old part of the college, and infinitely better than his version of Gothic

At Gonville and Caius, out of deference to the Renaissance treatment of the older parts of the college, this Gothic element was intentionally mingled with classic detail, the steep roofs are reminiscent of French Renaissance buildings. He returned to Gonville and Caius in 1883 to add a new lecture theatre block. In (1868–70) Waterhouse added to Jesus College, Cambridge a new three-storey range of undergraduate rooms, in red brick with stone dressings in style matching the existing Tudor buildings. He also restored the Master's Lodge and added a new gateway. At Trinity Hall, Cambridge (1870–73) he added the East range of the South Court, housing sets of rooms over four floors. At Pembroke College, Cambridge, with a generous budget of £70,000 (over £8,000,000 in 2019) he added the new Master's Lodge (1871–73) and South Range known as the Red Buildings (1871–72), he used a French Gothic style for the buildings. They are of red brick with stone dressings. He went on to design the new Hall in (1875–79), fellows' sets and a new library (1877–78), with its bold clock tower. In (1878–80) the Oxford Union commissioned an extension from Waterhouse, consisting of a new debating hall.

===== Girton College, Cambridge =====
Waterhouse was commissioned by Emily Davies to design his only new college at either of the ancient universities, the Women's college Girton College, Cambridge. Gothic of red brick and terracotta. Davies wrote in a letter of 1866 to her friend Anna Deborah Richardson, in which she outlined her vision for the college:

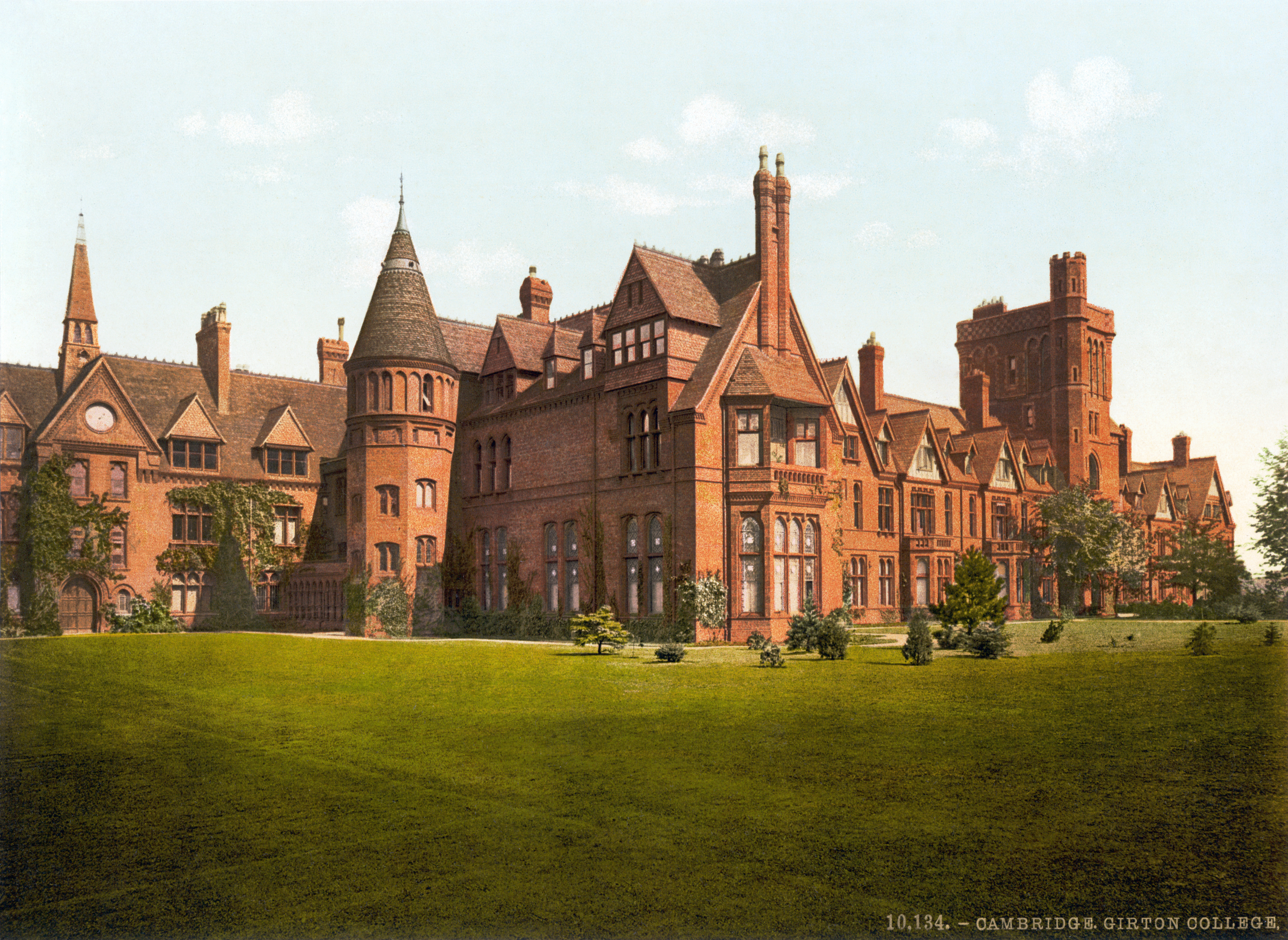
Girton College, Cambridge, showing the building phases of 1883–85 & 1886-89

..to be as beautiful as the Assize Courts Manchester, with gardens and grounds and everything that is good for body and soul and spirit. I don't think I told you how intensely we enjoyed the beauty of the Assize Courts. I have seen no modern building to be compared with it, and the delight one felt in it made one realize how much one's happiness may be influenced by external object

A year later she wrote again to Richardson:

I hope we shall get Waterhouse, I am anxious that the building will be as beautiful as we can make it

The first phase dates from 1871–75 and consisted of 18 sets of undergraduate rooms, Fellows' rooms and Hall forming the north side of what became Emily Davies Court. In 1875-77 he added more undergraduate sets, classroom, laboratory and gymnasium. In 1878 he designed additional college rooms. In 1883-85 he designed additional rooms and service areas, extended the Hall, built Stanley Library named after Henrietta Stanley, Baroness Stanley of Alderley and the Mistress's flat, In 1886-89 the gate tower and new ranges of college rooms forming Cloisters Court and the garden layout. Finally in 1898–1902 came the Chapel, two new ranges of rooms, a new Hall and Kitchens and an indoor swimming pool. A unique facility in a Cambridge College. Unlike most colleges at Cambridge, Waterhouse choose to access the rooms via corridors rather than the normal sets of rooms off staircases.

The budgets for the different phases of Girton College were: phase 1 £11,370, phase 2 £3,020, phase 3 £6,470 phase 4 £16,295 and phase 5 not known. The contractors involved were: general construction by the building firm of J. Loveday; the heating and ventilation was installed by G.N. Haden; the decorative tiling was supplied by W. Godwin; the simple patterned glass was made by F.T. Odell; chimneypieces were made by the Hopton, Wood Stone Co. with iron grates manufactured by D.O. Boyd; decorative ironwork was made by Hart Son Peard & Co. and Robert Jones; the main clock was manufactured by J. Moore & Son, with the bell cast by J. Warner & Sons. The College was later extended during the early decades of the twentieth century by both Paul Waterhouse and later Michael Waterhouse.

=== Manchester Town Hall ===
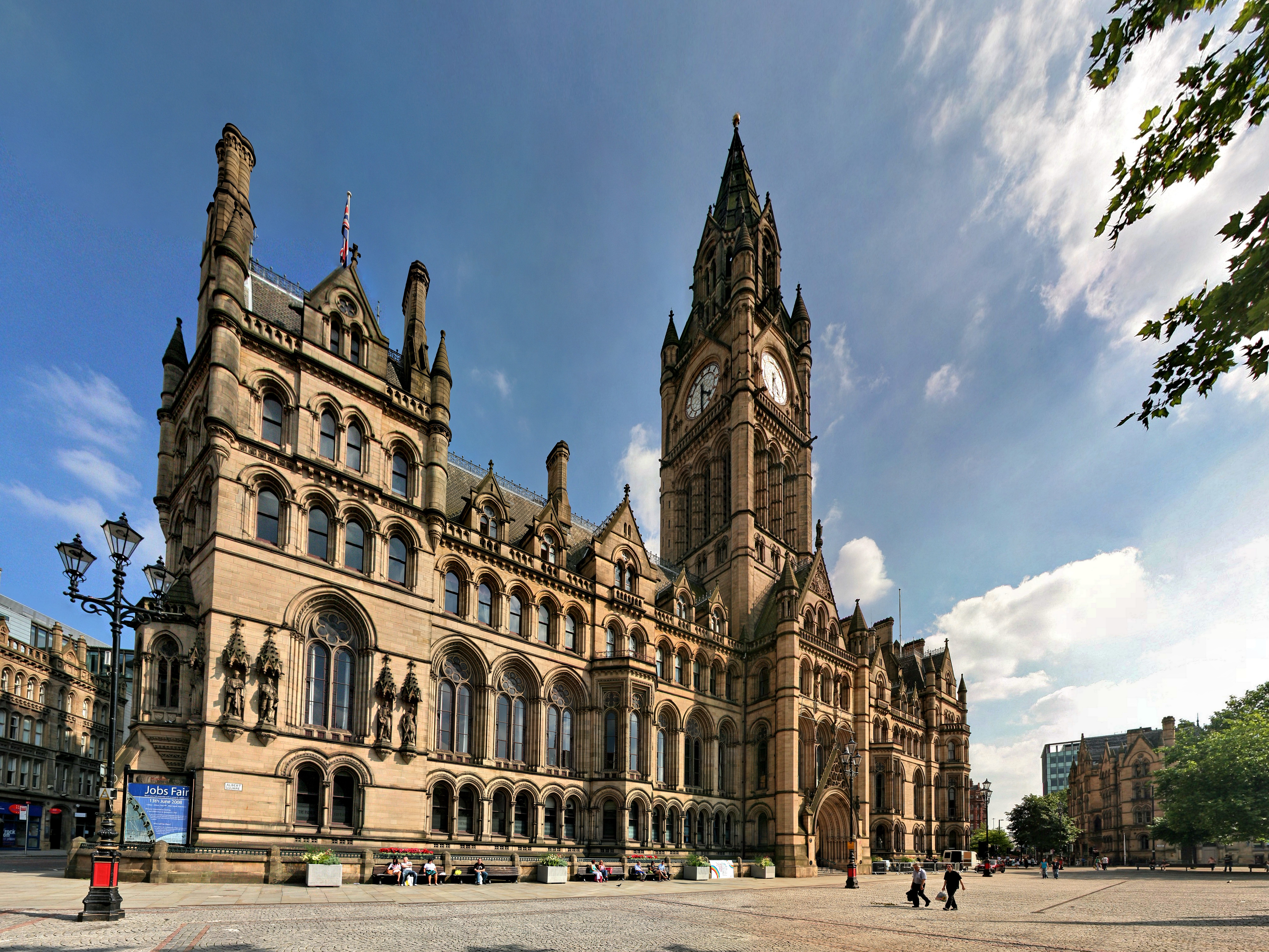
Principal facade Manchester Town Hall (1868-77), from Albert Square, showing the Clock Tower and the almost symmetrical facade, the ends vary in design

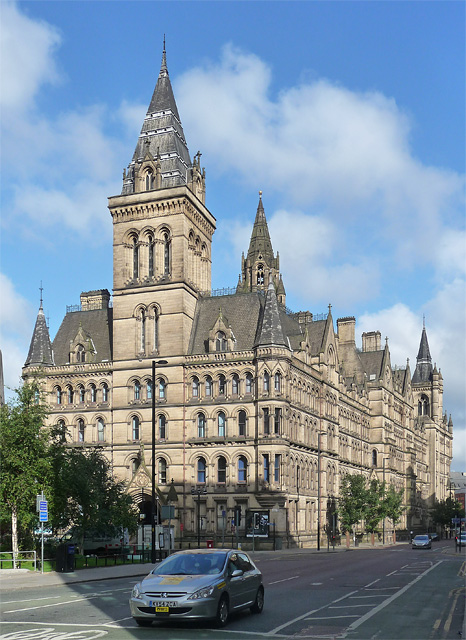
Manchester Town Hall, showing the rear facade on Cooper Street left and the Princess Street facade right

Manchester Town Hall was the result of a two-stage competition, after the first stage a shortlist was drawn up and the candidates allowed to amend their designs. The first stage closed in August 1867. A total of 137 sets of drawings by 123 competitors were entered. This first stage was judged by George Godwin. The designs were whittled down to these architects: Waterhouse, William Lee, Speakman & Charlesworth, Cuthbert Brodrick, Thomas Worthington, John Oldrid Scott, Thomas Henry Wyatt and Edward Salomons. The second stage was judged by Thomas Leverton Donaldson, a classicist, and gothicist George Edmund Street. In March 1868 Donaldson and Street chose Waterhouse's design as the winning design, this was their conclusion:

The architectural character of this design is, as we have said, is not so good as some of the others, but the plan has such great merits, is so admirably and simply disposed, and so well lighted, that we cannot but feel that it is thoroughly entitled to first place. The general disposition of the masses of the elevation is very picturesque, and there is much dignity about the treatment of the principal storey towards Albert Square. We are bound to say that in some respects the design appears to us to require additional study and modifications, of which it admits without difficulty.

Waterhouse revised the design, working on the main elevation and tower throughout 1868 and 1869, as late as July 1875 well into the construction of the building Waterhouse revised the main tower design to add an extra 16 feet to its height. In the Town Hall Waterhouse showed a firmer and more original handling of the Gothic style. Built 1868-77, the building would cost £521,357 (over £60,000,000 in 2019) but with the purchase cost of land, furnishings and fees the total cost was £859,000 (over £99,000,000 in 2019) making it Waterhouse's most expensive building. The building was opened on 13 September 1877, overseen by the Mayor of Manchester Abel Heywood, who was the driving force behind the building of the new Town Hall.

The main facade to Albert Square is 328 feet long, the tower is 285 feet high. The building is an irregular quadrilateral in plan, the Princess Street facade is 388 feet wide, the Cooper Street facade is 94 feet wide, the facade on Lloyd street, is 350 feet wide. The main entrance is in the centre of the Albert Square facade below the tower, a low vestibule leads to the main staircases with two branches sweeping up to the landing outside the Great Hall. The main rooms are along the first floor overlooking Albert Square, these are the Banqueting Room, Reception Room, Lobby below the tower, Mayor's Parlour, Ante-Room and Council Chamber. The site of the building is essential a triangle with a truncated tip, the Public Hall sits in the middle of the site surrounded by three small courtyards, with a corridor running along all three sides, with the offices and main rooms facing the outside streets. Where each corridor meets is a circular staircase linking all floors, two further staircases are placed one each in the middle of the two long corridors running behind the offices on the Princess Street and Lloyd Street fronts. The ground floor originally included a police station with cells, fire station and post office, accessed from Lloyd Street.

In the 17 October 1874 issue of the Builder was the following review of the building, described as:

in that manner of Gothic treatment which its author seems to have finally made up his mind to, and which he has to some extent invented for himself; a manner which is not highly picturesque in detail, but has a sterling common-sense look about it which will probably always be recognized as satisfactory and appropriate in its way, whatever changes of taste we may go through

Writing in the book published in 1878 to celebrate the opening of Manchester Town Hall, An Architectural and General Description of the Town Hall Manchester edited by E.A. Axon, the following description of the building's style is given:

The style of the new Town Hall may be described as thirteenth century Gothic, suffused with the feeling and spirit of the present age. It is a successful vindication of the claims of Gothic to be capable of serving all the purposes of the practical life of the nineteenth century. Broadly speaking it is built in the form of Gothic common in the thirteenth century, but, as Mr Waterhouse has rightly claimed, it is not a middle age but a modern building. Mr Waterhouse, indeed, discourages the application of the term mediaeval as descriptive of this monument to his genius. He claims for it that it is "essentially of the nineteenth century, and adapted to the wants of the present day."

The building is faced in Spinkwell stone chosen for its ability to resist damage from pollution, though the core and inner part of the walls are built of yellow brick, the roof is of slate. Hopton Wood Stone is used internally for example for chimneypieces. Numerous contractors, craftsmen and artists were involved in the construction of the building. Those contractors involved in the physical structure of the building were: the foundations were dug by firm of Thomas Clay; the superstructure was built by the building firm of George Smith; fireproof construction was the responsibility of Dennett & Co.; structural steelwork was provided by J.S. Bergheim and Andrew Handyside and Company; the heating and ventilation of the building was the responsibility of Dennett & Company. Certain features of the building were designed by specialists: the clock in the main tower was designed by Gillett & Bland and the bells in the tower were cast by John Taylor & Co. The organ in the Great Hall was built by Aristide Cavaillé-Coll. The Hydraulic hoists were designed and installed by Edward T. Bellhouse & Co. When it came to the decoration and furnishing of the building, multiple firms, designers and artists were involved. Gibbs and Canning provided terracotta used internally as wall cladding. Ceramic tiling for walls and floors were by Craven Dunnill & Co, W. Godwin and W.B. Simpson. The stone carving internally and externally was by Farmer and Brindley. Mosaic flooring was laid by J.Rust. Marble flooring was installed W.H. Burke and company. The painted decoration, mainly ceilings, including the great hall, vestibule and corridors was painted by Heaton, Butler & Bayne, R. Pollitt and Best & Lea. The simple stained glass used throughout the building was created by F.T. Odell. The decorative iron work was produced by Francis Skidmore, R. Jones, and Hart, Son, Peard and Co. The chimneypieces were made by the Hopton Wood Stone Co.. Furniture & wooden fittings were made by Doveston, Bird & Hull and H. Capel. The curtains in the main rooms were designed by R.E. Holding and made by the Royal School of Needlework. The Murals in the Great Hall were painted by Ford Madox Brown. The large number of contractors involved show the sheer complexity involved in coordinating the project, the clerk of works who was in charge of the building site was K.J. Osbourne.

=== Natural History Museum ===
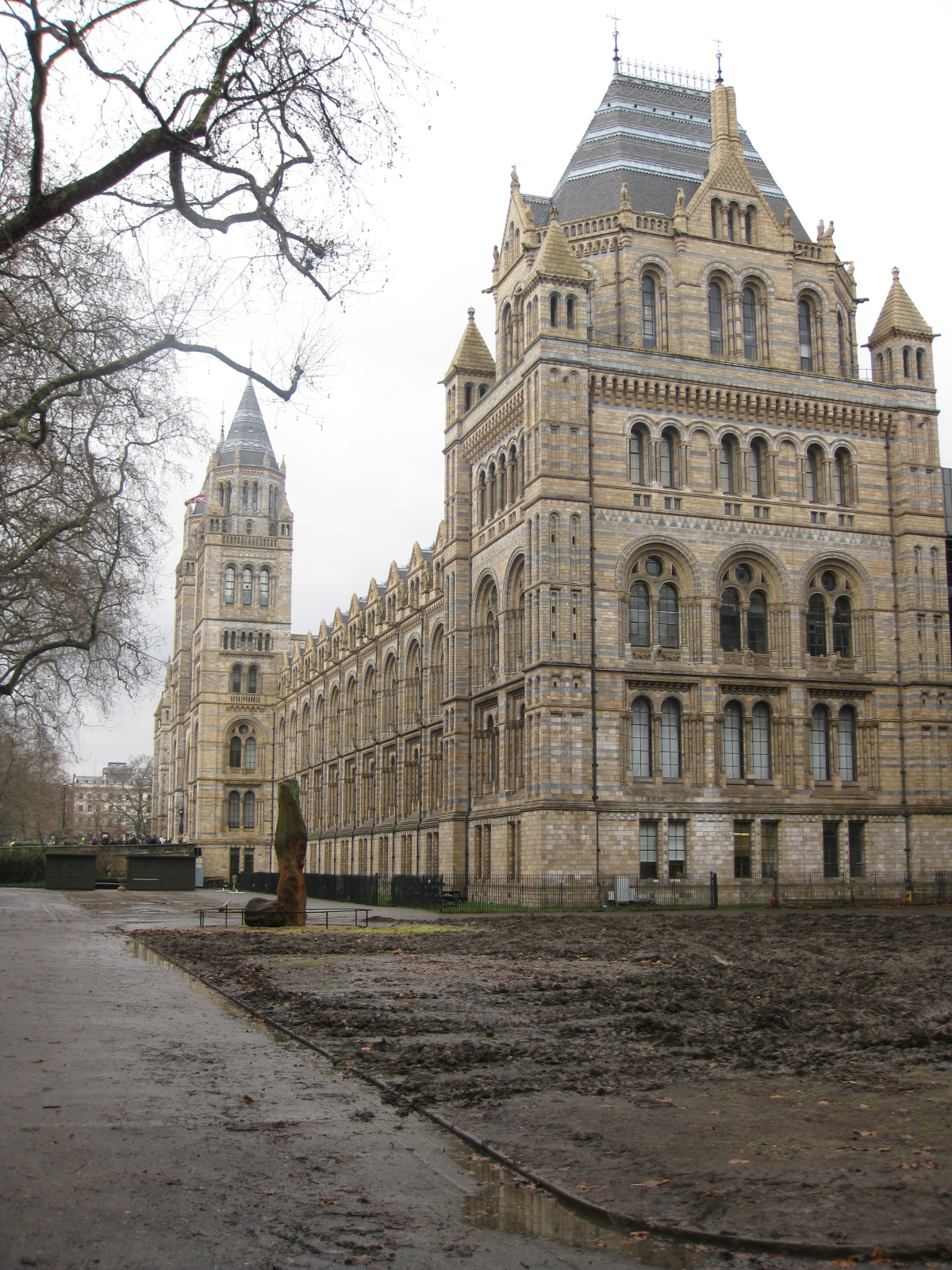
Main (South) facade of The Natural History Museum (1873-81), viewed from the east, showing the large number of blocks of terracotta of varying size, shape and decoration needed, mainly buff but with a blue-grey colour used sparingly for decoration, with decorative sculptures also of terracotta

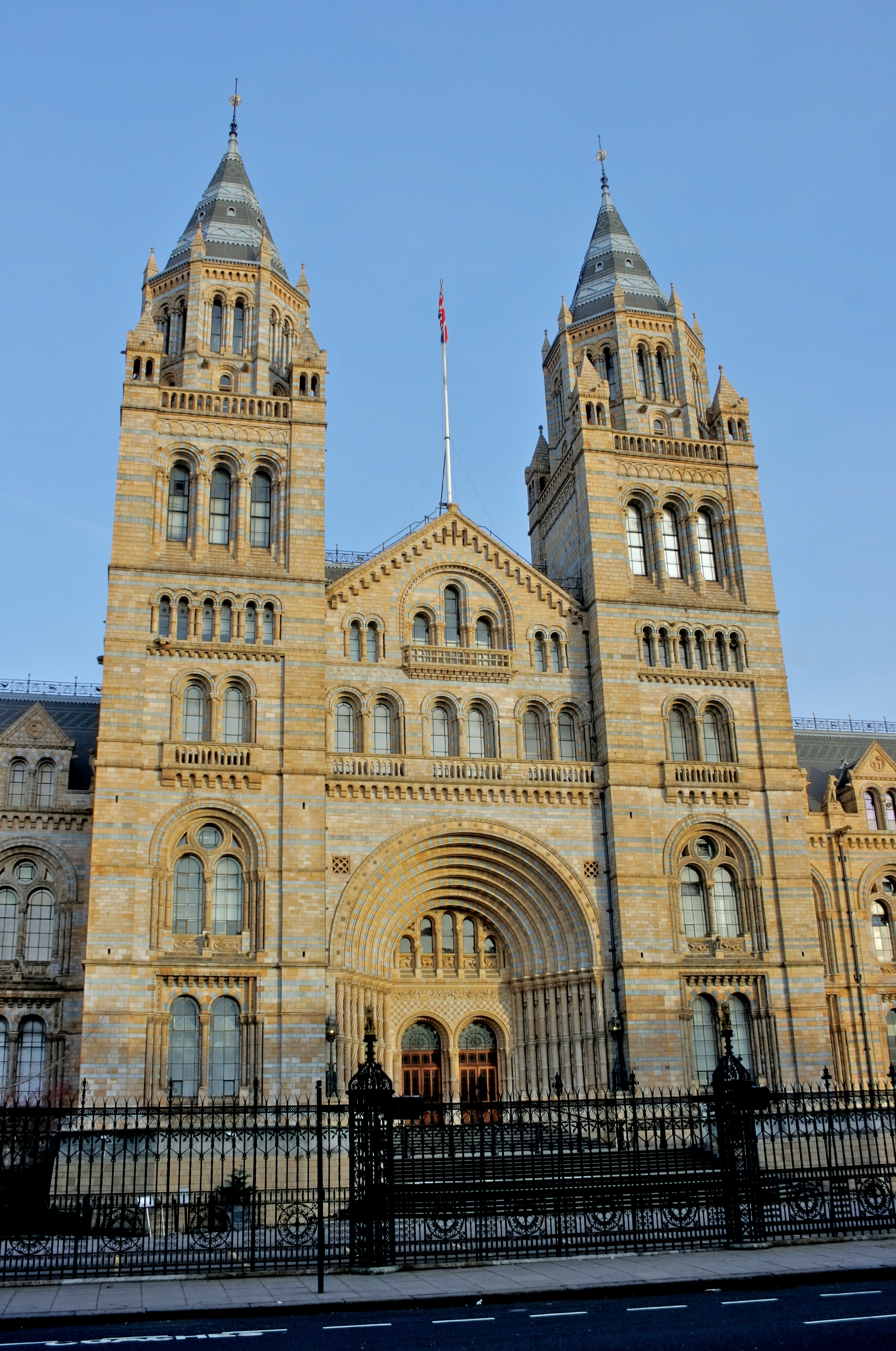
The main entrance and flanking towers, Natural History Museum, the octagonal top storey of the towers contained the water tanks, the four pinnacles surrounding the octagonal tower tops are the air intakes and exhaust vents for the Museum's ventilation and heating system

Waterhouse received, without competition, the commission to build the Natural History Museum in South Kensington, he was approached by William Cowper First Commissioner of Works at the end of 1865 to carry out the design for the museum by the architect Francis Fowke who had just died. However a change of government meant plans were put on hold for eighteen months, in March 1868 Waterhouse submitted a new design, but the government changed again and the new First Commissioner Austen Henry Layard wanted the museum to be built in a new location on the Thames Embankment, but another change of First Commissioner Acton Smee Ayrton, switched the site back to the original site on Cromwell Road, he also cut the budget from £500,000 to £330,000 (about £39,000,000 in 2019). All this meant Waterhouse had to keep amending the designs for the museum. The solution to the reduced budget that Waterhouse came up with including omitting the large lecture theatre that had been part of the design from the beginning, and to build the Museum in two stages. That first stage is the Museum as it was opened. The second stage that was never built, was to build the side facades and the rear facade of the Museum. As late as 1911-13 plans were produced to complete the east and west facades, but the outbreak of World War I prevented its execution.

Finally in spring 1873 work began on the building, the contractors who worked on the building were for the general construction of the building G. Baker & G. Shaw and Mowlem, with the structural iron work being manufactured by J.S. Bergheim, all the terracotta used was manufactured by the firm of Gibbs and Canning. The Museum opened to the public in April 1881, only two years before the director and driving force behind the museum Richard Owen retired. The design which marks an epoch in the modern use of architectural terracotta and which was to become his best-known work. The eventual cost of the building was £412,000 (roughly £47,000,000 in 2019). But by the time the costs of the fittings were added the total cost was £549,045 (approx £63,000,000 in 2019) with additional expenditure of £7,200 in 1882 when the Spirit Room (where animal specimens were preserved in spirit) was built as a separate building, it has been demolished, and £2,500 in 1884 for two entrance lodges to the grounds. The building was the first in England to have its facades completely clad in terracotta. The style of the building is Romanesque Revival architecture, and is especially influenced by German buildings, notably The Liebfrauen Kirche, Andernach and Worms Cathedral. The main facade is 750 feet in length. The Magazine of Art, vol 4, 1881 p36 described the style of the Museum:

The Building is not a classical one, although it has classical traditions in its balanced symmetry....Nor is it a Romanesque building, notwithstanding the varying recurrence of the round Arch. It is not a Gothic building though having steep gables and an arrangement of roofing which are eminently Gothic in motif, as they are effective and picturesque in outline and grouping. It is, in short, a Victorian building and no other, designed upon principles which have informed the great works of all time, but adapted to the wants, using the materials and employing the methods of the age in which we live

The distinctive features of the building's facade are the end pavilions with their octagonal attic towers supporting steep roofs, and the twin towers 190 feet high flanking the arched main entrances. Entering through the main doors, these are reached via an exterior staircase. The visitor passes from the Entrance Hall beneath the arch supporting the main staircase from the 1st to the 2nd floor, ahead on the end wall of the main hall, lies the main staircase imperial in form, rising from the ground to the first floor. The Main Hall has a gallery at first floor level running down both its flanks, that links the two parts of the main staircases. Immediately north of the Main Hall is the North Hall. Although Romanesque in style, the drama is more akin to Baroque architecture. The front part of the building has three floors of public galleries. Flanking the Main Hall on each side are three large top lit galleries, the large galleries are separated from each other by narrower galleries. The roofs of these single floor galleries is the same form as the Main and North Halls, the lower half of the slope is glass the upper solid. All the ground floor galleries open to the south off an east-west corridor that links them to the Main Hall. Leading off the corridors are links to the ground floor galleries along the Museum's main facade.

The interior and exterior also has much decorative and sculptural terracotta. The Museum's Director Richard Owen provided advice on animals living and extinct that Waterhouse could use in the decoration. The Waterhouse drawings for all the terracotta decoration in and on the building were converted to three dimensional clay models by a Frenchman by the name of M. Du Jardin, who worked as a foreman for Farmer and Brindley, who also carved and installed the marble window sills in the Museum. These clay models were then used to make moulds from Plaster-of-Paris, these moulds were then used to create the actual terracotta sculptures by Gibbs and Canning, the same sculpture is often used multiple times to decorate the Museum. The east wing of the museum has terracotta sculptures of extinct creatures, the central block and west wing of living species. The ceilings of the Main Hall and of the North Hall are decorated with paintings of plants. It is likely that the Museum's Keeper of Botany William Carruthers provided guidance and plant specimens for Waterhouse to base his designs on. The plants that decorate the Main Hall are from right across the Globe, the North Hall is decorated with paintings of native British plants. The Waterhouse drawings were converted into full size paintings by the Manchester firm of Best & Lea. The decorative ceramic tile-work was manufactured by W.B. Simpson & Sons Ltd. The simple stained glass was executed by F.T. Odell, designed by Waterhouse in his preferred light colours. It is either geometrical or based on a botanical theme. The decorative ironwork, for example the cresting on the roofs and the railings around the Museum, was executed by Hart, Son, Peard and Co.

An important aspect of the building's design was fire proof construction, the galleries in the front part of the Museum are supported by internal iron columns that are sheathed in terracotta to protect them from fire. These columns supported fireproof concrete vaulted ceilings, hidden by plaster ceilings. The roofs of the single storey galleries were made from iron and glass. The floors throughout the Museum were of terrazzo and mosaic, the flooring was executed by the firm of W.H. Burke & Company. Both hard wearing and inflammable. All windows in the building were iron framed. Further iron shutters were used to close the arched entrance doors to the different galleries. The use of gas lighting in the Museum was restricted to certain areas, the Index Room this is now the North Hall located behind the staircase in the Main Hall, and the ground floor front galleries. When the lighting was in use the rest of the Museum would be isolated by lowering the iron shutters. Additionally the tops of the two towers flanking the main entrance housed large water tanks that supplied fire-hoses.

The heating and ventilation system drew fresh air and expelled stale air from vents in the four square pinnacles around the base of the octagons on top of the two towers in the centre of the facade and in a similar manner from the tops of the two pavilions at either end of the facade. The fresh air is brought into the galleries via vents around the tops of their walls. There are two slender northern towers in the middle of the back facade of the Museum that function in the same way for the single storey galleries. The north-east tower also housed the flue from the heating boiler located beneath the North Hall. The mechanical parts of the heating and ventilation systems was installed by Stevens & Son.

In the 22 June 1878 issue of the Builder was the following review of the building:

But taking the building as a whole, its architect is to be congratulated on having produced a remarkable work, eminently suited to its intended purpose, and presenting, in the interior especially, unusual architectural interest both of ensemble and detail, and forming a very fine illustration of what can be done with terracotta as a material for architectural embellishment on a great scale

=== Eaton Hall ===
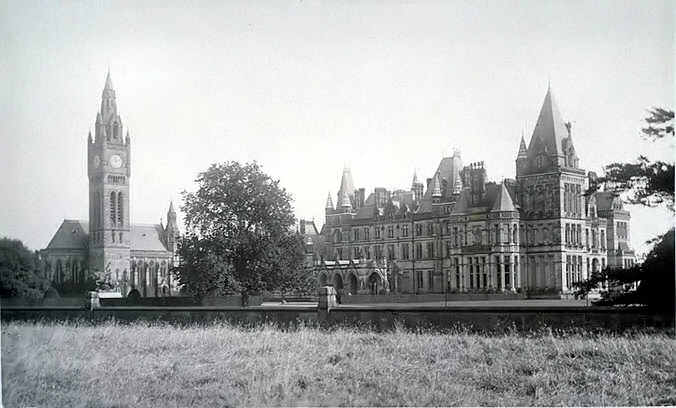
Eaton Hall (1869-83), Entrance front in 1907, demolished 1961-63 apart from the chapel, on the right is the Library wing with its own squatter tower with pyramidal roof, just visible in the middle is the porte-cochère and the elaborate French-style steeply pitched roofs with tourelles of the main building

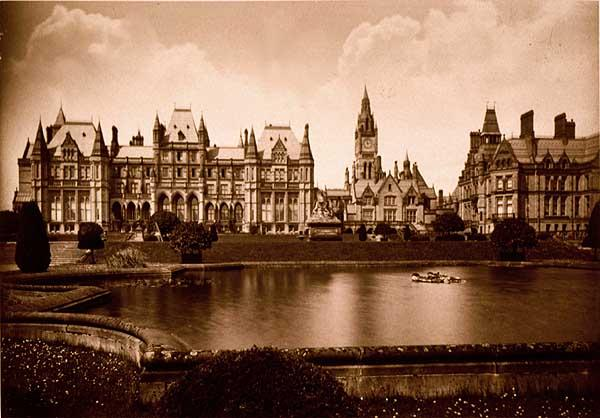
Eaton Hall, Garden front c.1880, demolished apart from the chapel and stable court, the main rooms with bedrooms above on the left, in the centre is the servants wing with chapel rising above, on the right the private wing, the surviving stable court is out of view behind and to the right of the private wing

The most important domestic building of Waterhouse's career was Eaton Hall in Cheshire, built for the richest man in Britain Hugh Grosvenor, 1st Duke of Westminster. He was commissioned in 1869 and work was completed in 1883. This Gothic mansion was the most expensive domestic commission of the Victorian age by 1883 £740,550 (approx £85,100,000 in 2019). There was later expenditure on the buildings, in 1884-91 of £3,725 and in 1898-99 of £1,120 (in total approx £600,000 in 2019).

Waterhouse had to completely remodel and extended the current house. Work began with the new library wing to the south of the building, the library was 90 by 30 feet, followed by a new billiard room and wing containing bedrooms for bachelor guests to the north-west, new bedrooms were added above the existing state rooms, and a separate private wing built to the north-east, the stable yard behind the Chapel was built between 1877 and 1879. The large new Chapel with its 185-foot tall clock tower that also contains a carillon, is along with the stable court the only part of the building surviving. The house contained 190 rooms. The servants' wing contained a double-height kitchen that was 55 by 25 feet. Running through the building from the Library at the southern end to the chapel at the northern was a corridor 330 feet in length, at its southern end rose the Grand Staircase. Built from stone lined with granite columns and stone arches. The balustrade unusually for a staircase in a Waterhouse house, was also of stone. The corridor then opened out into the entrance hall and saloon, both rooms were heighten to two floors. Passing on through the new service wing, until it met the corridor linking the Chapel to the large new private wing. At roughly 100 feet square, this in itself was as large as a country house. The building incorporated the latest in Victorian technology. Although all the main rooms had fireplaces there is a central heating and ventilation system that was installed by G.N. Haden. There were goods lifts, thirty-three toilets and eight bathrooms. Initially gas was used for lighting and cooking, but electric light was installed in 1887. A narrow-gauge railway was laid in 1896 to link the Hall with the Great Western Railway sidings at Balderton, Cheshire.

Attached to the house to the north of the Chapel are the surviving stables, stretching over three hundred feet in length. These are formed around two courtyards, the larger with the stables proper and in its centre is a bronze statue of a rearing horse being restrained by a man, sculpted by Joseph Edgar Boehm. The stables have heated stalls. The arch in the north range, flanked by octagonal towers with conical roofs, leads into the second smaller courtyard. This is surrounded by the Carriage houses of red brick, plainer in style than the stables. The courtyard is roofed with a cast-iron and glass roof. There is also a riding hall. The buildings are of red brick with and half-timbered, a mixture of French gothic and Tudor style. Even the latches and hinges of the doors are of polished brass, these are some of the largest and most richly appointed country house stables of the Victorian period.

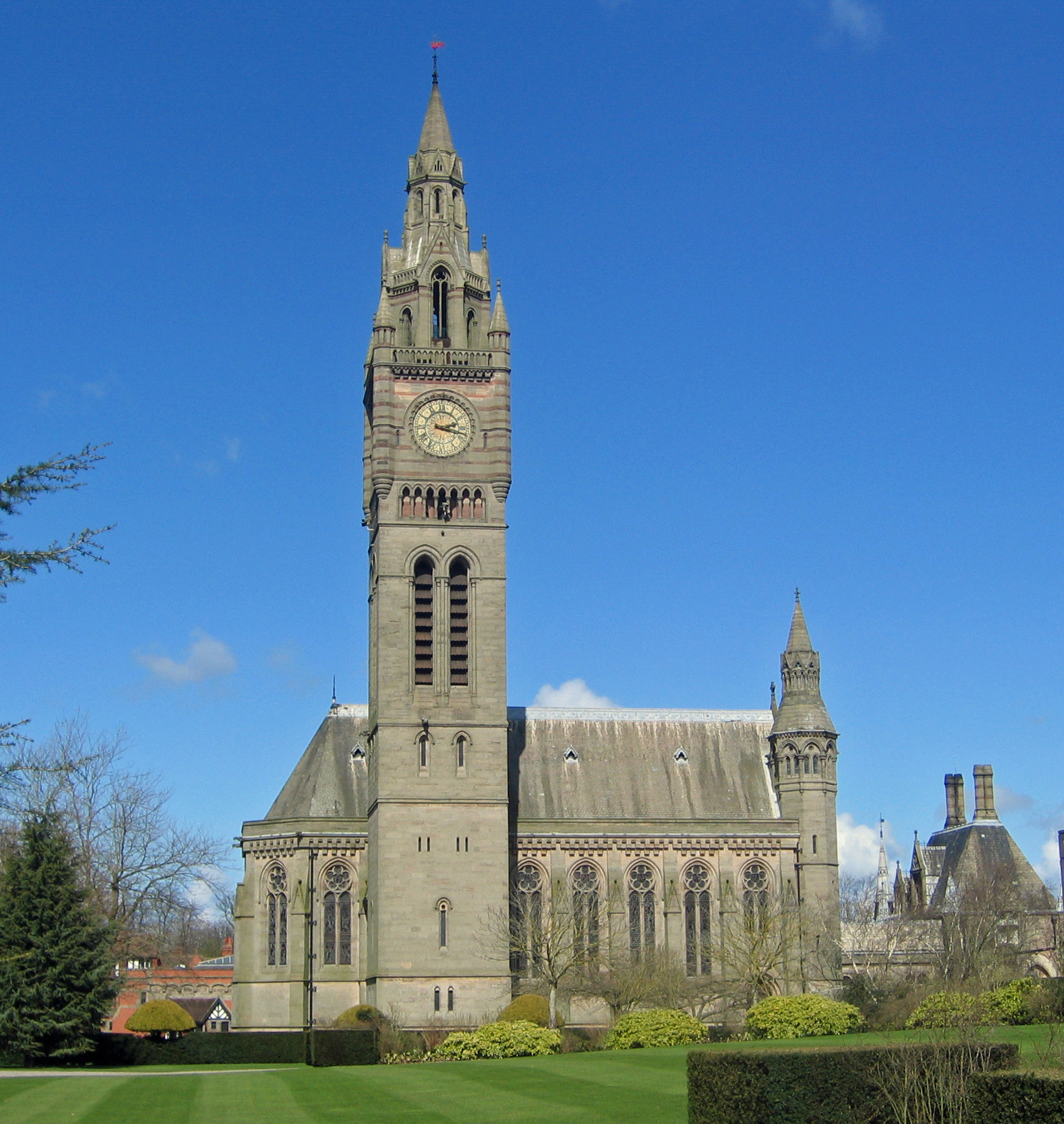
The Gothic Chapel, Eaton Hall, plain solid buttressed walls, with its steeply pitched roof of plain slates, the window tracery is simple in design, this contrasts with the elaborately decorated termination to the tower, the clock face and the stage above it have stripes of red stone running in bands around them

The interiors were all remodelled using sumptuous and costly materials and furnishings, much use being made of various coloured marbles and alabaster in carved fireplaces, columns and other features, rich marble mosaic work on the floors, in the Library there was walnut panelling inlaid with boxwood and mother of pearl. The decoration of the interiors was the responsibility of many craftspeople: Heaton, Butler and Bayne designed both armorial stained-glass and six illustrating Alfred, Lord Tennyson's Idylls of the King; Gertrude Jekyll designed the tapestry panels on the staircase, woven at the Royal School of Needlework; Henry Stacy Marks painted murals of the Pilgrims from The Canterbury Tales on the walls of the Saloon; decorative ceramic tiles were by William De Morgan; Farmer & Brindley were responsible for the extensive carving inside and out in the building. Although the furniture in the house was largely that used in the previous building additional furniture and furnishings were provided by the firm of Best & Lea.

The surviving Chapel's decoration shows what was lost: the building consists of a five bay nave, the first bay of which has a stone screen supporting a gallery below the east window dividing it from the chapel forming the ante-chapel. There is a three bay chancel with an apse. The chapel is stone vaulted. The exterior of the Chapel as with the rest of the mansion, was mainly of Manley sandstone. The interior used Spinkwell, Waverton, red Mansfield and light red Runcorn stones, the vaulting is of Streetly and Minera stone. Frederic Shields designed the sixteen stained-glass windows in the Chapel, which were made by Heaton, Butler and Bayne, on the theme of the Te Deum and Shields also designed the accompanying mosaic decoration, that was executed by Jesse Rust; William Morris was consulted over the design of the mosaics, he recommended marble as opposed to glass mosaics; the iron work is probably by Francis Skidmore, the nave has an encaustic tile floor, the chancel has Cosmati style paving with porphyry and marble. Alabaster is used in the font, the low screen separating the chancel from the nave, the reredos and pulpit. The pews with seating for about one hundred people and the choir stalls are carved from walnut. The reredos was designed by William Morris and installed in 1893. Housed above the vestry that connects the Chapel to the clock tower, is the organ of 1881, designed by Charles Whiteley & Co. The clock in the tower was by Messrs Gillett & Co. the four faces being nine feet eight inches in diameter, the accompanying twenty-eight bells and carillon were by Van Aerschodt, the largest bell weighing fifty hundredweight. John Stainer composed tunes for the carillon. Building News magazine reviewed the water-colour perspective for the chapel in their May 1875 edition:

..represents a picturesque cluster of buildings, consisting of a private chapel for Eaton Hall, with a high pitched roof, flanked by a slender staircase turret; while detached but still forming part of the group stands a square clock tower of very considerable size and height with clock faces contrived in the same manner as those at Westminster, and surmounted by a picturesque high roof. Mr Waterhouse's usual mastery of outline and skill in composition are well seen in this clever view.

Waterhouse designed several of the buildings and lodges on the Eaton Hall estate, the rare for Waterhouse, use of the Neoclassical style in the Parrot House (1881–83), circular in plan, built of bright yellow terracotta supplied by J.C. Edwards (Ruabon) Ltd, the interior also of terracotta is decorated with griffins and caryatids, although heated it was never actually used as was intended to house parrots. Also in a classical style is the Temple (c.1880), of three arches flanked by Ionic columns, built to house an ancient Roman altar. He adapted the Golden Gates by the Davies brothers of Bersham, having Skidmores extend them at the sides and designed the two lodges (1880) flanking the gates, this used to face the main entrance to the Waterhouse mansion. The North Lodge (1881) to the Eaton Hall Estate was also Waterhouse's, it is a four-storey round tower with a conical roof, in the style of late medieval French chateau.

==== Gallery of Eaton Hall ====
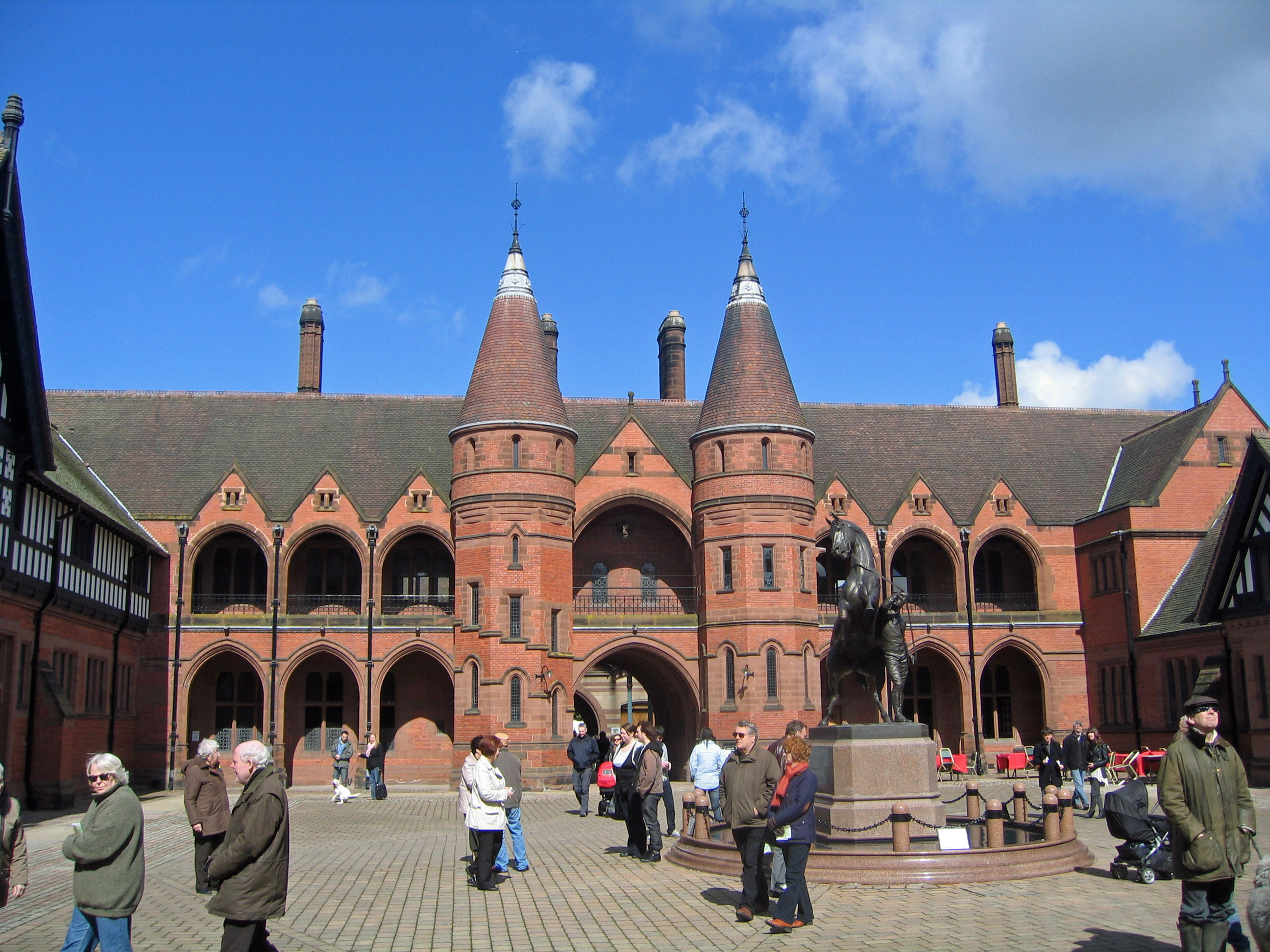
Stables, Eaton Hall, is directly north of the Chapel, in red brick, showing French late Gothic influence and the use of Tudor style half-timbering in the upper storey in the flanking ranges

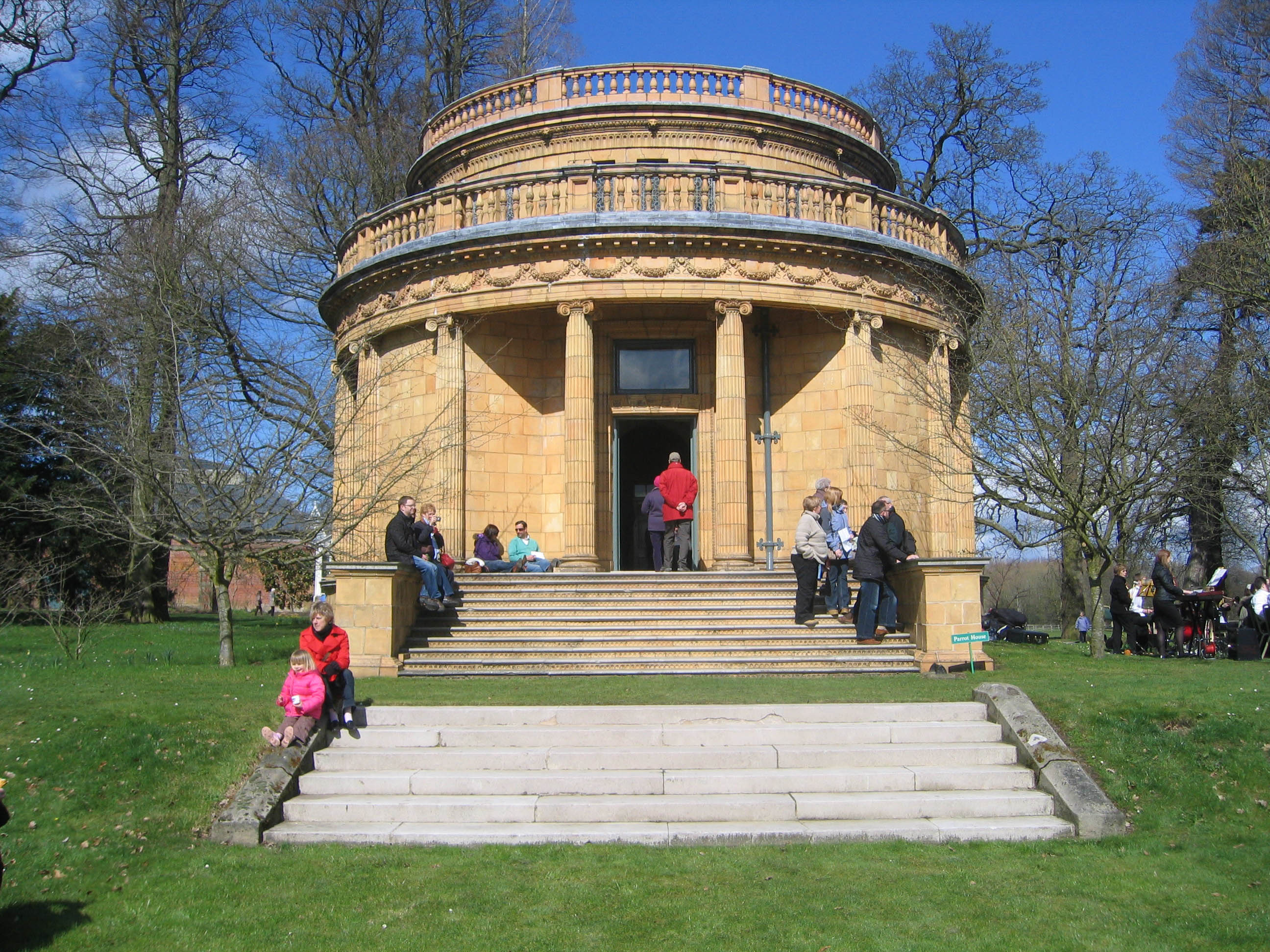
Parrot House, in the grounds of Eaton Hall, a very rare example of Waterhouse designing a neo-classical building, also the use of bright yellow terracotta is atypical

=== National Liberal Club ===
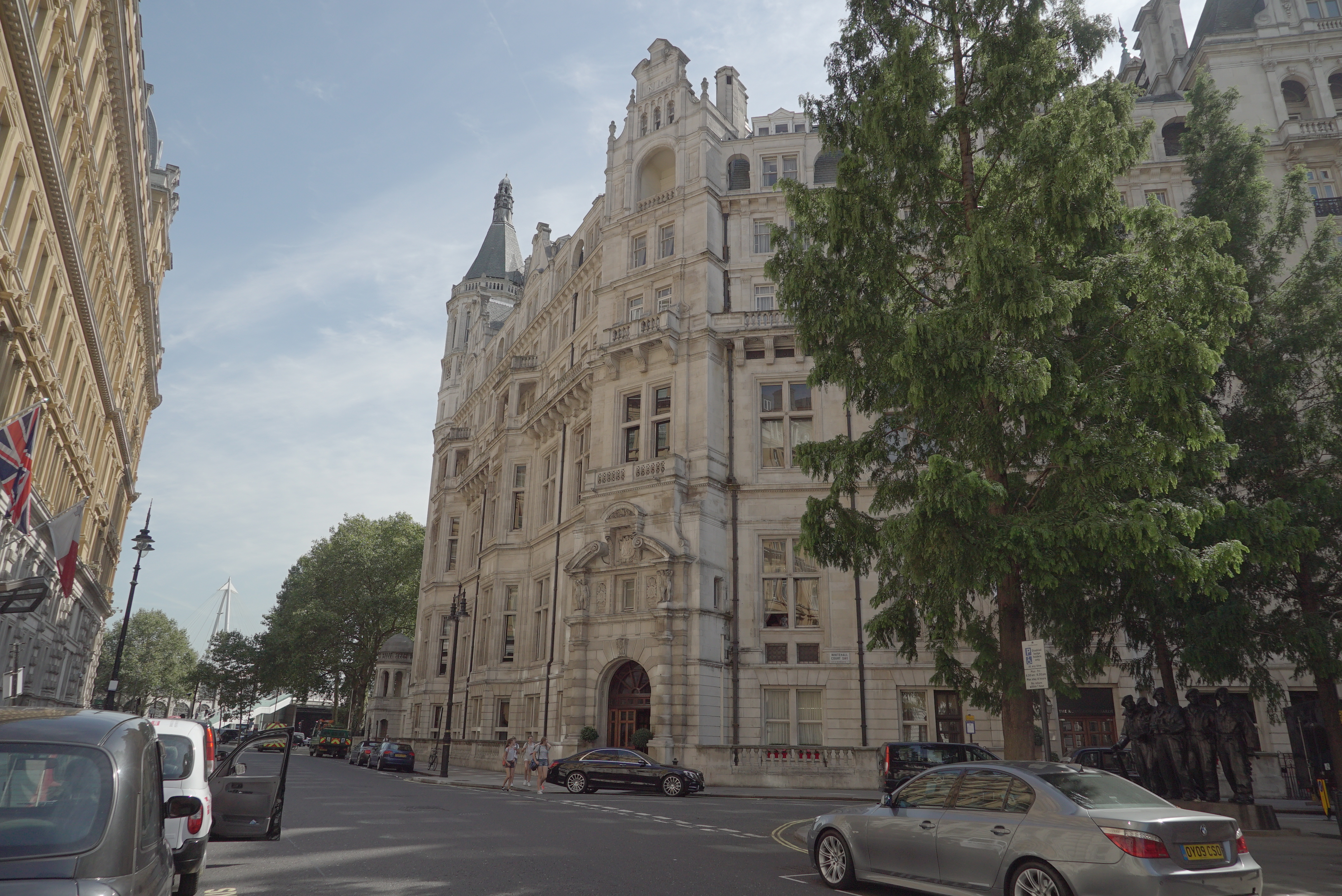
Entrance front, National Liberal Club, London (1884-87) note the doorway with its Italian renaissance design, the thin tower just visible on the left contains the secondary staircase

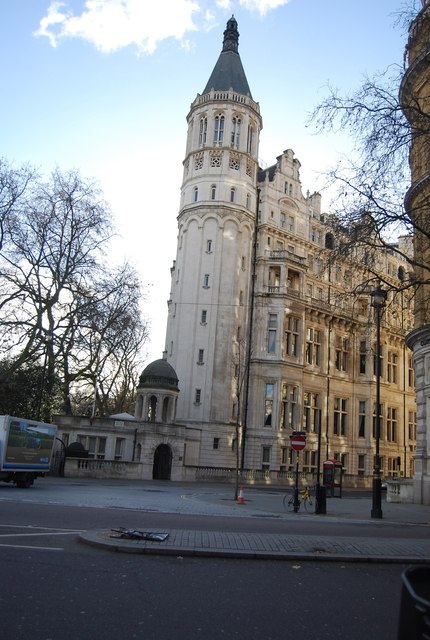
The National Liberal Club, the tower houses the secondary staircase, to the left is the terrace with the billiard room beneath, to the right the lowest row of windows lights the original Smoking Room, above is the former Writing Room (now the Smoking Room), the next level is the Gladstone Library, these are double height spaces, the upper four floors are bedrooms

One of the Waterhouse's significant public buildings in London is the National Liberal Club (1884–87) a Gentlemen's club, it is a study in Renaissance composition. He himself belonged to the Liberal Party and his brother Theodore was solicitor to the club. It was built on a key site overlooking Whitehall Gardens and Victoria Embankment. The budget was a generous £200,000 (about £23,000,000 in 2019) of which £169,950 was spent on the building. The club members had decided they wanted the building in an Italian Classic style. The Builder magazine trying to describe in issue xlvii of 1885 the style of the building had this to say:

Its style could not be described in a word....the Liberal party is a heterogeneous jumble of discordant elements, and....in scattering varied inconsequential details over his work Mr Waterhouse has exactly hit off the idiosyncrasies of his clients

The site was on an awkward corner, being trapezoidal in shape. The design had to incorporate both several large rooms and the largest number of members' bedrooms in any London Club, well over a hundred. The building is clad in Portland stone at the insistence of the Crown Estate, owners of the land. The entrance hall leads to the main staircase, elliptical in plan, originally it was based on the Bramante Staircase in the Vatican, but damaged by bombing in World War II it was rebuilt as a cantilevered stair, though the marble balustrade is close to the original. The main staircase is at the centre of the building and the other rooms are designed around it. The lower flight leads down to the original double height Smoking Room that is entered from the basement, where the extensive wine cellars were. The Smoking Room has faience covered walls, Ionic columns and ceiling, easy to clean nicotine stains off, the ceilings in the rest of the building are plaster. The rest of the entrance level known as the lower ground floor is taken up with a reception lobby, cloak rooms, billiard room and other ancillary spaces. The next floor up, the upper ground floor, contains the Grill Room overlooking Whitehall Place, the main dining room overlooking the Embankment, the Writing Room that overlooks Northumberland Avenue, these are all double height rooms. The terrace outside the dining room runs the full length of the building and is above the former billiards room on the lower floor, this contained six full sized billiard tables. The main staircase rise to the first floor where it ends, this floor contains more public rooms, including the Reading Room overlooking the Embankment, with the Gladstone Library next door that overlooks Northumberland Avenue, the walls are lined by two levels of book cases the upper reached from a gallery running around the room, with an iron work balustrade. There used to be 35,000 books on the shelves, these were sold to the University of Bristol in 1975 and have been replaced by fake book spines.

The roof of the building is influenced by French Renaissance buildings such as Château de Chambord. Rising a total of seven floors including the rooms in the roof. The structure has external load-bearing stone walls, but with steelwork columns and beams internally. The steelwork was the most complex yet used in a London building, it enabled the lower floors with a series of large rooms, the dining room for instance is 110 feet long by 35 feet wide, to support the walls of the much smaller bedrooms. The building also incorporated other advanced features, the use of electric lighting, the provision of hydraulic lifts, and sewage disposal systems, the use of dropped ceilings in the main rooms allowed space for the ventilation system, the air for which was cleansed by high pressure water jets before being circulated through the rooms. Additionally the building had a large number of bathrooms and toilets. Much decorative use is made internally of faience of varying colours to clad columns and other features. The major rooms are all lined by rows of columns along their walls, each room having a slightly different style of column and colour of faience cladding. The original main staircase used a variety of different types of marbles for the balustrade and Tuscan columns that use to support it. Waterhouse also designed most of the furniture and furnishings.

Several contractors were involved in the building's construction, the foundations were dug and laid by Henry Lovatt; general construction of the buildings superstructure was by William Southern; structural steel-work was installed by W.H. Lindsay; the fireproofing was installed by Dennett & Ingle; the heating and ventilation system was designed and installed by W.W. Phipson and electric lighting was installed by the Edison and Swan Electric Light Company. When it came to the decoration and furnishing, the contractors involved were, the stone carving mainly on the exterior of the building was by Farmer and Brindley, and C. Smith; the faience decoration, used extensively internally, was manufactured by Wilcock & Co.; the interior tiling was provided by Carter Johnson & Co.; mosaic flooring was installed by J.F. Ebner & Son; chimney-pieces were manufactured by the Hopton Wood Stone Co, with fire grates provided by D.O. Boyd; the decorative ironwork was forged by Hart, Son, Peard and Co.; the ornamental plaster-work was the work of G. Jackson; furniture and furnishings were manufactured by Morris & Norton, W. James & Co., Maple & Co., who also provided the carpets for the building. The clerk of works for the building was Thomas Warburton. Since 1985 the Club has only used the Upper Ground Floor the rest of the building is now part of The Royal Horseguards Hotel.

=== Prudential Assurance Company ===
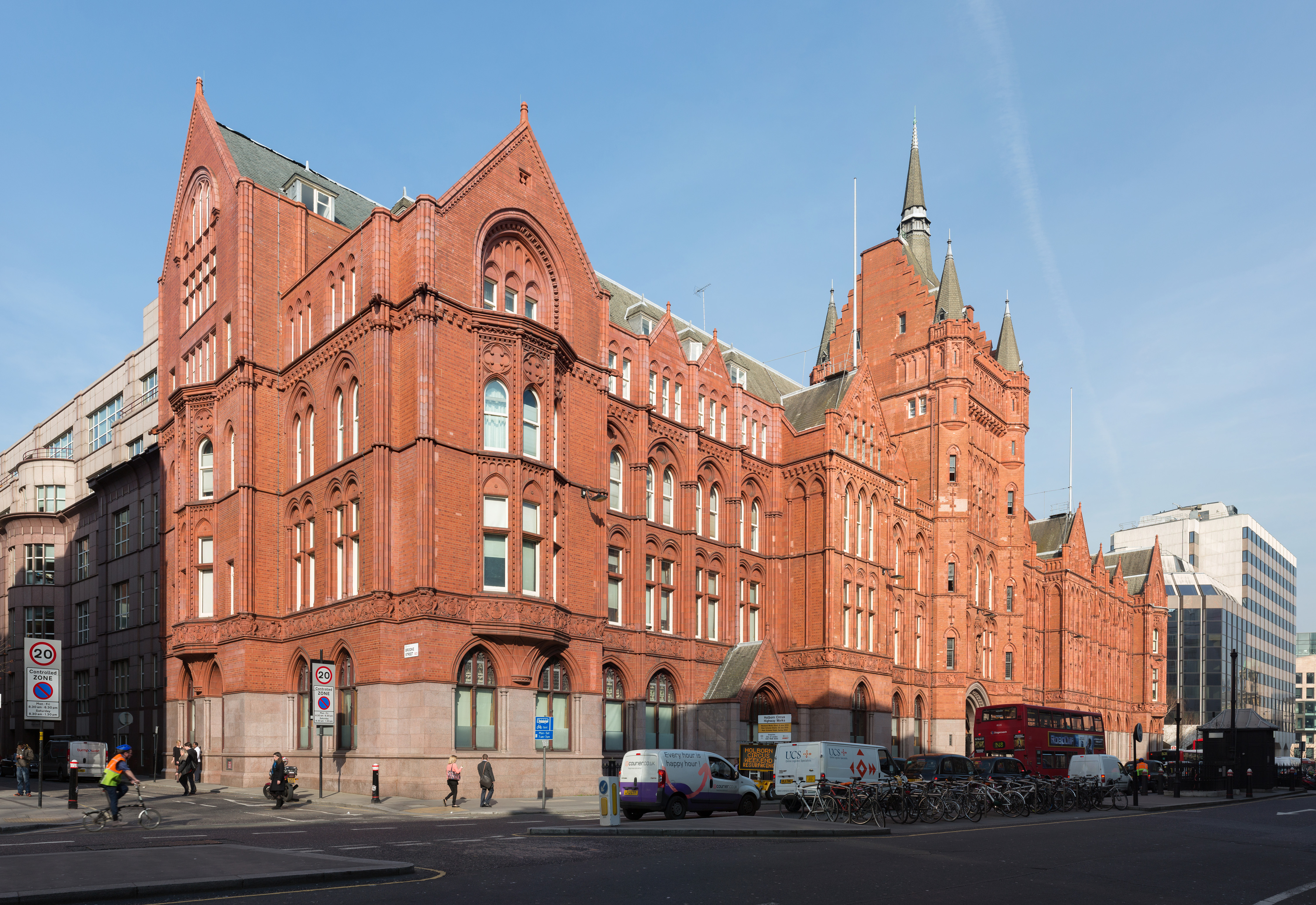
Holborn Bars, High Holborn, London (1897–1901), Waterhouse's largest and most expensive commercial building, Gothic, using the standard design grey granite lower walls, red brick with red terracotta decoration

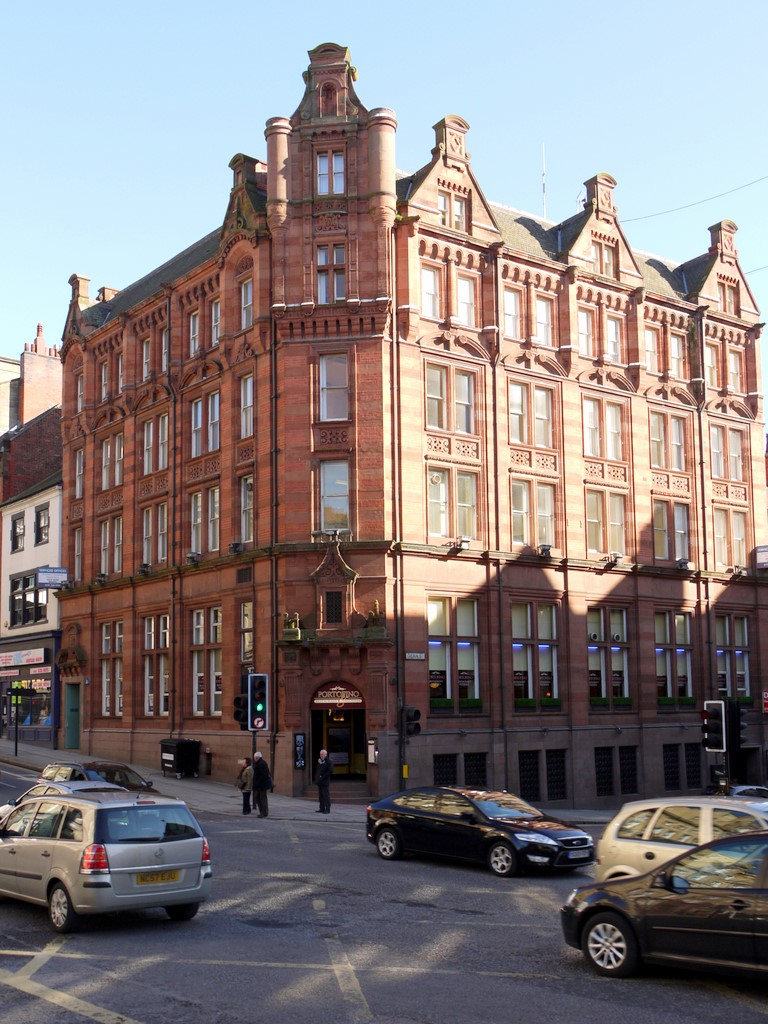
Prudential Assurance, Newcastle (1891-97) grey granite base with brick and stone walls

The Prudential Assurance Company founded in 1848, was growing rapidly by the 1870s, and adopted a policy of constructing custom-built offices with speculative office development Waterhouse's first commission for the company were the headquarters building the first phase of Holborn Bars (1876–79) on the corner of Brooke Street (this phase was replaced in 1932) built on the site of Furnival's Inn, initially the capacity was for 500 clerks. The building would expand in three more phases up to 1901 by which time it filled the entire block. Phase 2 (1885–88) extensions on Brooke Street and Greville Street, phase 3 (1895) the north range of the main courtyard, phase 4 (1897–1901) was the main entrance block along High Holburn, this contains the grand interiors that use Burmantoft's faience the elaborate Directors' Staircase has mosaic and terrazzo floors, it leads to the first floor board room with elaborate wood panelling. This final phase resulted in a building with a footprint of 2.5 acres, and used 1,500 tons of steel framing provided by Handyside. The steel columns allowed open interiors. The columns were clad in faience. The most opulent of the offices were the Cashiers Office and Public Office located on the ground floor behind the main facade.

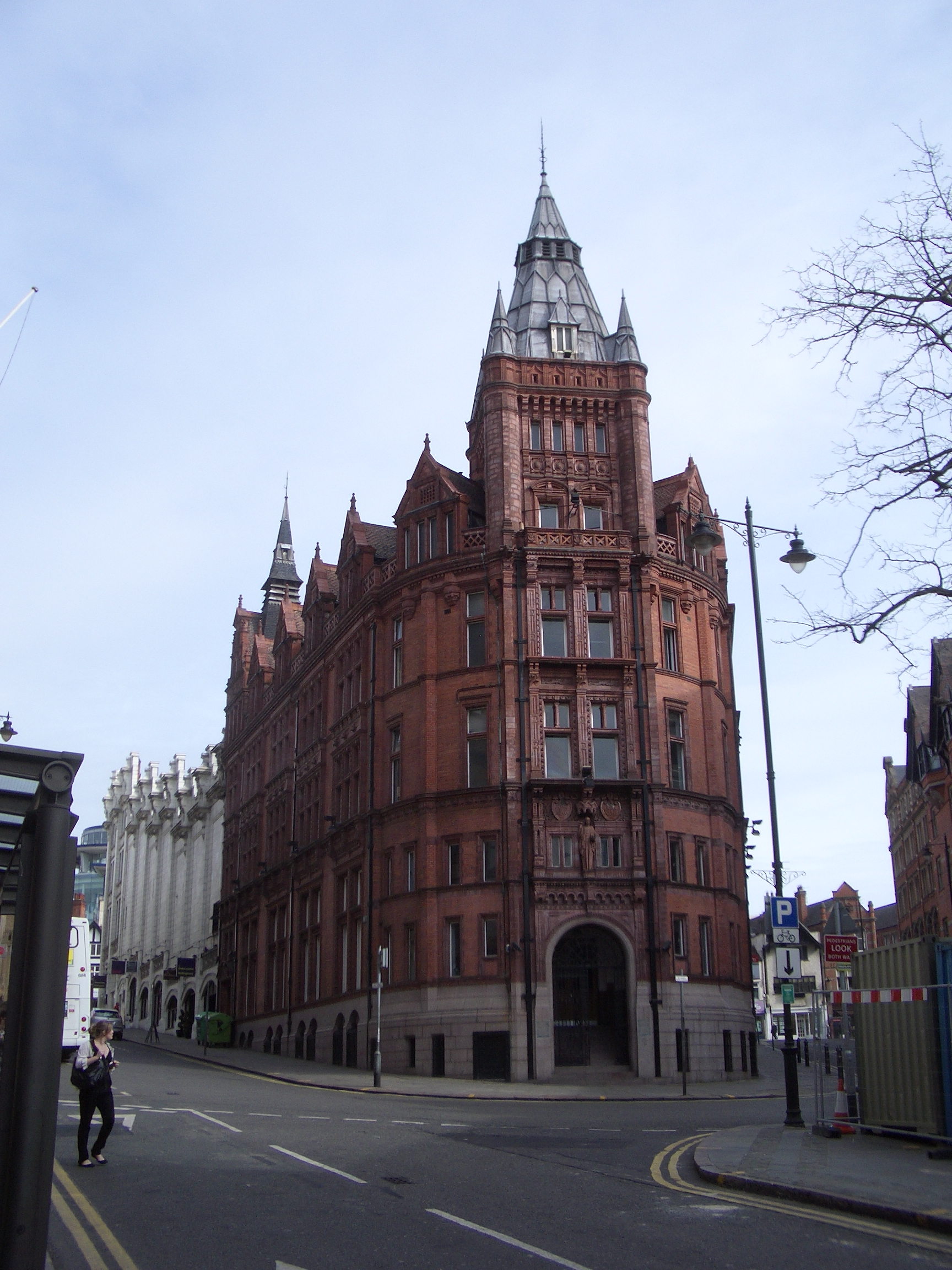
Prudential Assurance, Nottingham (1893–98) grey granite base, red brick and terracotta walls, the decoration is more elaborate than normal

The cost of the phases were: phase 1 £144,940, phase 2 £20,455 plus £6,765 for alterations to the existing building; phases 3 & 4 £150,155, (in total approx £37,000,000 in 2019). The contractors for the building work were Holland & Hannen; structural steel work by J.S. Bergheim; heating and ventilation by W.W. Phipson & D.O. Boyd; the terracotta was manufactured by Gibbs & Canning; granite stonework was laid by Farmer & Brindley, who in conjunction with F. W. Pomeroy, also provided the models for the terracotta decoration, namely the frieze of cherubs that runs around the building below the first floor windows and the decoration and statue over the entrance arch; ceramic tiles by W.B. Simpson; the decorative faience tiles were by Burmantofts, used in the entrance halls, on the main staircase and in the offices used by members of the public; the chimney-pieces were provided by W.H. Burks; internal decoration was by L. Liberty & Co.; furniture and fittings were manufactured by H, Capel, Glouster Wagon Company, and Maple & Co.; decorative ironwork was manufactured by Hart Son Peard & Co. The Building News of 8 April 1878 described the new building:

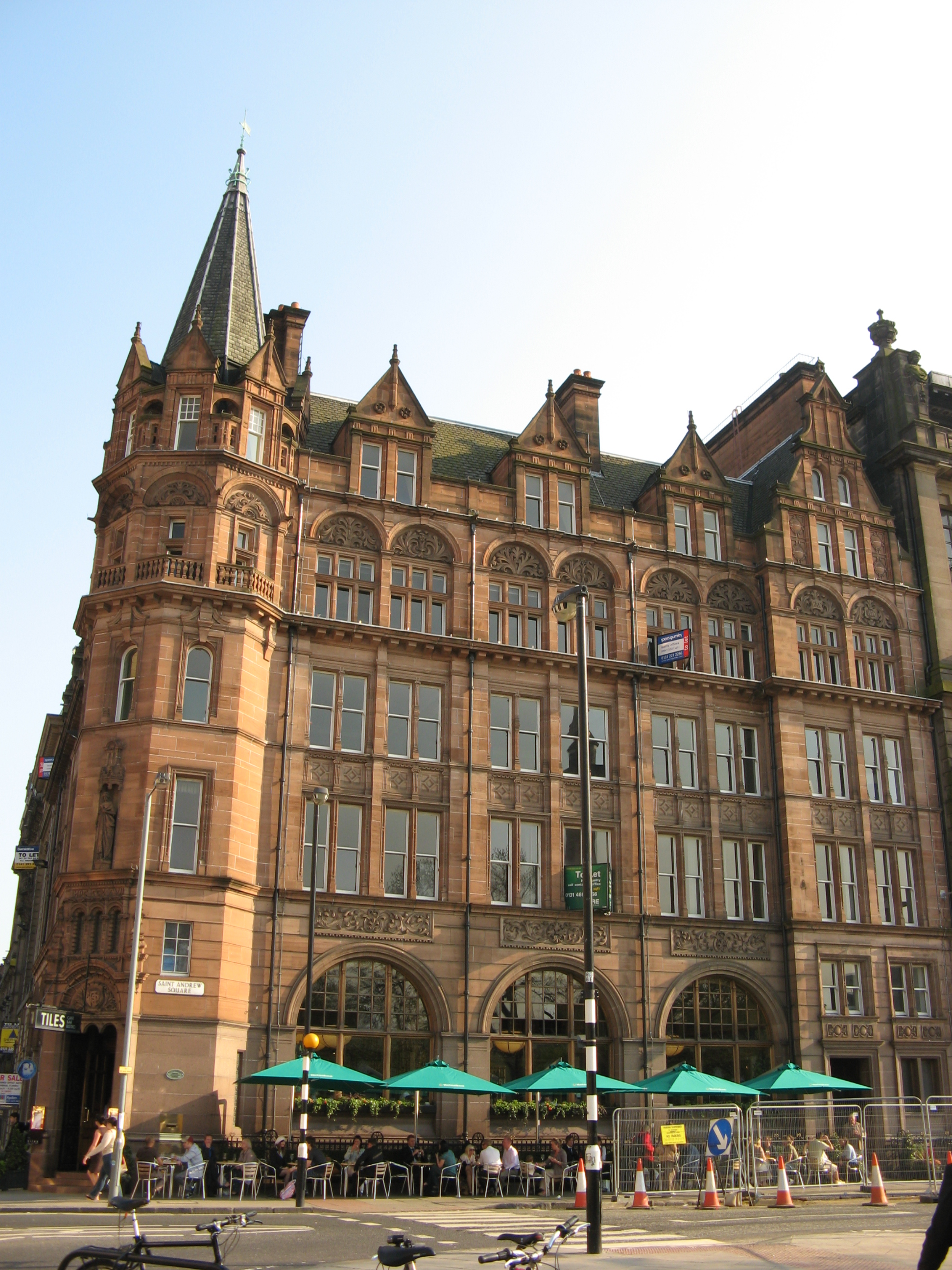
Prudential Assurance, Edinburgh (1895–99) this is the design he used only in Scotland, grey granite base with sandstone walls

We have here then a building which presents some commendable features, and which may challenge, without exaggerated pretensions, many costlier buildings in the same thoroughfare of brick and stone. It marks a more sensible use of the material terracotta than we have been accustomed to see since Mr Christian gave us the front of the Economic Assurance Office in Bridge Street, Blackfriars. We have generally had to complain of a redundant use of enrichment, a mechanical monotony in the setting and distribution, that has greatly injured the reputation of the material as one of the most natural we possess, and one that will resist the elements besides acids and alkalis."

Between 1876 and 1901 he would go onto design buildings for the Prudential not just their headquarters but a further twenty-one offices at towns and cities throughout Britain, Paul Waterhouse would design further buildings for the company after his father retired. The sites for the buildings were often awkward and hemmed in, but had to include a large public office, space for the clerks and separate offices for the managers. The public offices and managers rooms were normally at the front of the buildings on the ground floor. The buildings also had separate chambers that were leased to other businesses, for example the Leeds office had twenty different occupiers. An early restaurant chain Ye Mecca leased basement space in the Prudential buildings at Nottingham, Leeds and Birmingham. The buildings were built to a standard form, with polished grey granite base, most are built from hard red terracotta and brick, Newcastle and Glasgow use stone and brick. while Edinburgh and Dundee use stone. Leeds used light coloured terracotta and red brick. All the buildings had elaborate roofs with gables and many have towers or turrets. The interiors have typical faience clad walls and columns in the public offices and managers offices. The statue of Prudence above the main entrance to the Nottingham building was modelled by F.W. Pomeroy. The bright red terracotta used on many of the regional buildings was manufactured by J.C. Edwards of Ruabon.

This is a chronological list of Prudential Offices outside London designed by Waterhouse:

- Liverpool, Dale Street, (1885–88) cost £15,360, was extended in 1904-06 by Paul Waterhouse
- Manchester, King Street, (1886–89, the gables and roof have been removed and replaced by a plain parapet and a recessed top floor) cost £8,230
- Portsmouth, Guildhall Walk. (1886–93) cost £20,356
- Glasgow, corner of Renfield Street and West Regent Street, (1888–93) cost £30,040
- Birmingham (1889–92, demolished) alterations (1895–96), cost £16,390 and £625
- Bolton, corner of Nelson Square and Bradshawgate, (1889), cost unknown (the ground floor has been redesigned to serve as a shop, and the roofline has been simplified)
- Leeds, Park Row, (1890–94) alterations (1895), cost £44,785 and £790
- Cardiff, Saint Mary Street, (1891–94) alterations (1895), cost £8,375 and £100 (the ground floor has been completely redesigned to serve as a shop)
- Newcastle, Mosley Street, (1891–97) alterations (1898–1900) cost £37,155 and £1,090
- Leicester (1892–96, demolished), cost unknown
- Bradford, Ivegate, (1893–96) cost £19,070
- Nottingham, junction of Queen Street and King Street (1893–98) cost £28,730
- Dundee, Meadowside, (1895–98) cost £15,475
- Edinburgh, Saint Andrew's Square, (1895–99) cost £31,155
- Sheffield, Pinstone Street, (1895–98) cost £20,820
- Oldham, Union Street, (1898) cost £20,225
- Bristol, Clare Street, (1899–1901) cost £15,000
- Huddersfield, corner of New Street and Ramsden Street, (1899–1901) £7,995 (the ground floor has been completely redesigned to serve as a shop)
- Plymouth (1899–1903, demolished during post-war rebuilding of the city centre) cost £7,500
- Hull, Queen Victoria Street, (1901–03, destroyed in World War II) cost £24,525
- Southampton, Above Bar Street, (1901–04) cost £21,815.

In 1901 Waterhouse designed Staple Inn Buildings on High Holburn, for the Prudential, it is nearly opposite Holburn Bars. Built as extra chambers for the Company. Waterhouse wanted to use buff terracotta as more sympathetic to Staple Inn next door, but the Company insisted that he stick with the house style of red brick and terracotta. The roof is of slate. Its five floors high, plus rooms in the attic. Built by Holland & Hannen at a cost of £29,305.

After Waterhouse announced his retirement, the board of the Prudential wrote to Paul Waterhouse to say:

...their regret at the proposed severance of his father's connection with the Company, and to express their appreciation and admiration of Mr. Waterhouse as an architect and the personal esteem in which they held him during an association extending over many years.

=== Building restoration ===
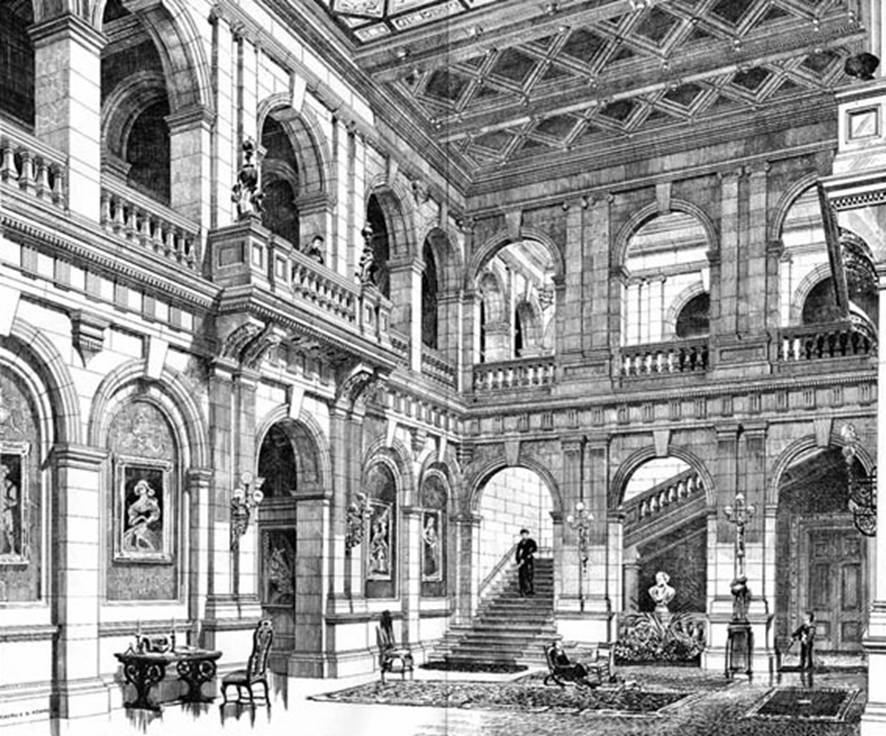
The Saloon, Heythrop Hall, Oxfordshire (1871–77) Waterhouse's rare foray into Baroque architecture. A style to match that of the original house

Building restoration, though never a major part of his work, Waterhouse was occasionally commissioned to restore buildings.

Heythrop Park, Oxfordshire, originally built (1706–13) designed by Thomas Archer, was gutted by fire in 1831. The restoration 1871-77 for Albert Brassey, left the exterior virtually as built, Waterhouse was freer with the reconstruction of the interiors of the house. Though using the original English Baroque style. The major interior is the saloon, in the style of John Vanbrugh, stone-walled, rising through two floors, with a stone staircase rising behind an arcade. Above the large stone chimneypiece are three stained glass windows by Morris & Co. of Faith, Hope and Charity (1877). He also designed the stables, the walled garden, a lodge, and cottages. The builders were William Cubitt and Company; the heating and ventilation was by D.O. Boyd; stone carving internally and externally was by Farmer & Brindly; decorative ceramic tiles were designed by J.M. Akllen, W. Godwin and William De Morgan; apart from Morris & Co., stained glass was also made by Edmundson & Sons and F.T. Odell; the chimneypieces were made by W.H. Burke & Co.; decorative iron work was by Hart Son Peard & Co. and R. Jones; plaster-work was executed by G. Jackson. The total cost was £153,000 (approx £16,800,000 in 2019).

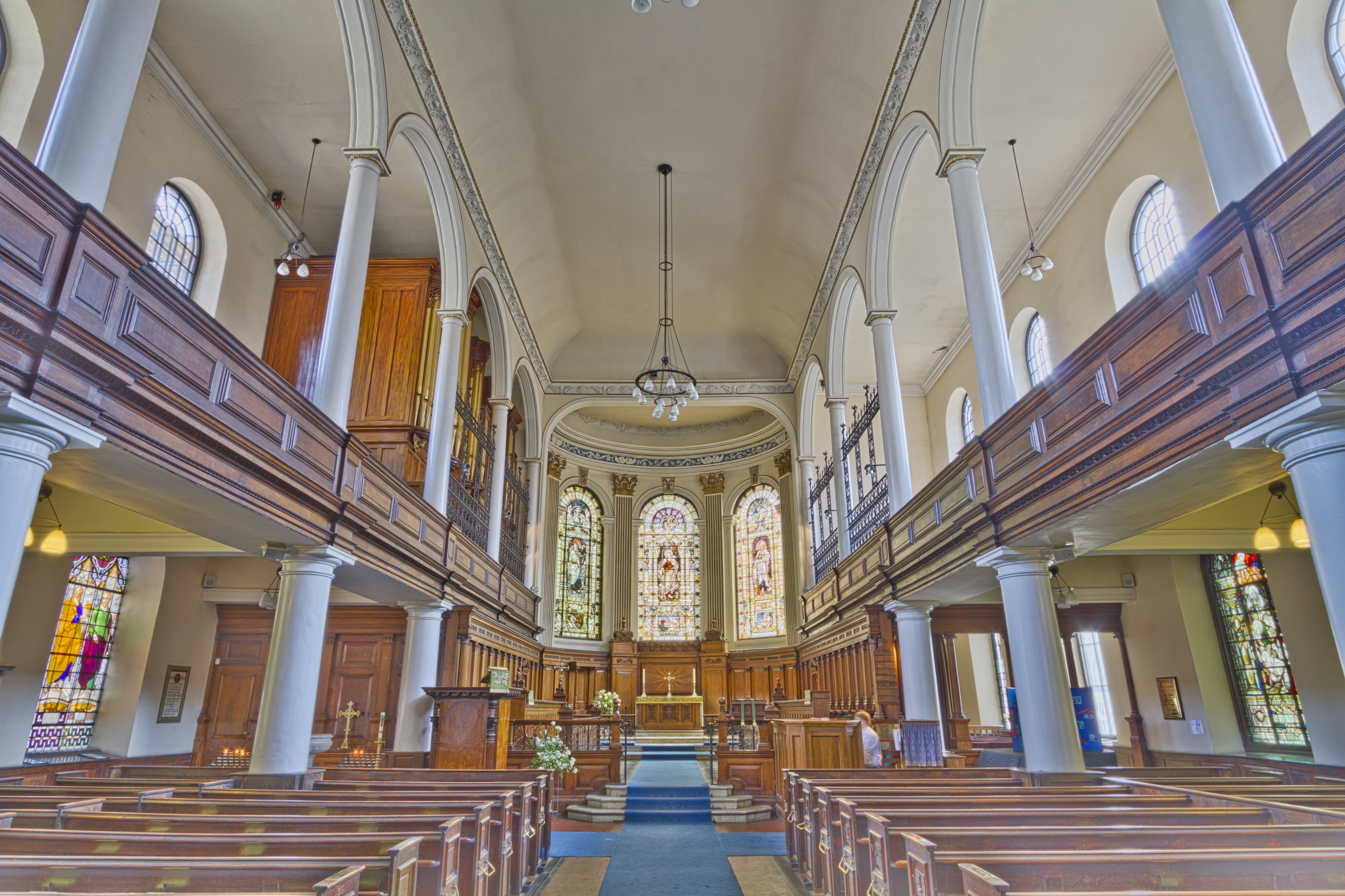
St Ann's Church, St Ann's Square, Manchester, restored (1887-91) with woodwork in a style contemporary with the church, and new stained glass in the end windows, the glass below the galleries, is too intense in colour to have met with Waterhouse's approval

Between 1887 and 1891 he restored St Ann's Church, Manchester, completed 1712. The Baroque style north door is probably by him. Internally he panelled the apse, a platform was created to support a new altar and reredos. The carved cherubs and swags were copied from the contemporary to the church, work of Grinling Gibbons in the choir of St Paul's Cathedral. He also rebuilt three galleries supported by Tuscan columns. Plus he added the north and south vestries. He commissioned stained glass designs from Frederic Shields. It was made by Heaton, Butler & Bayne. The general contractor for the building work was William Southern; marble work was by J. & H. Patterson; fixtures, fittings and furnishings were made by Doveston, Davey and Hull & Co.; decorative iron work was made by Hart Son Peard & Co. The cost was £3,100 with further work in 1896 at £445 and in 1901 at £205.

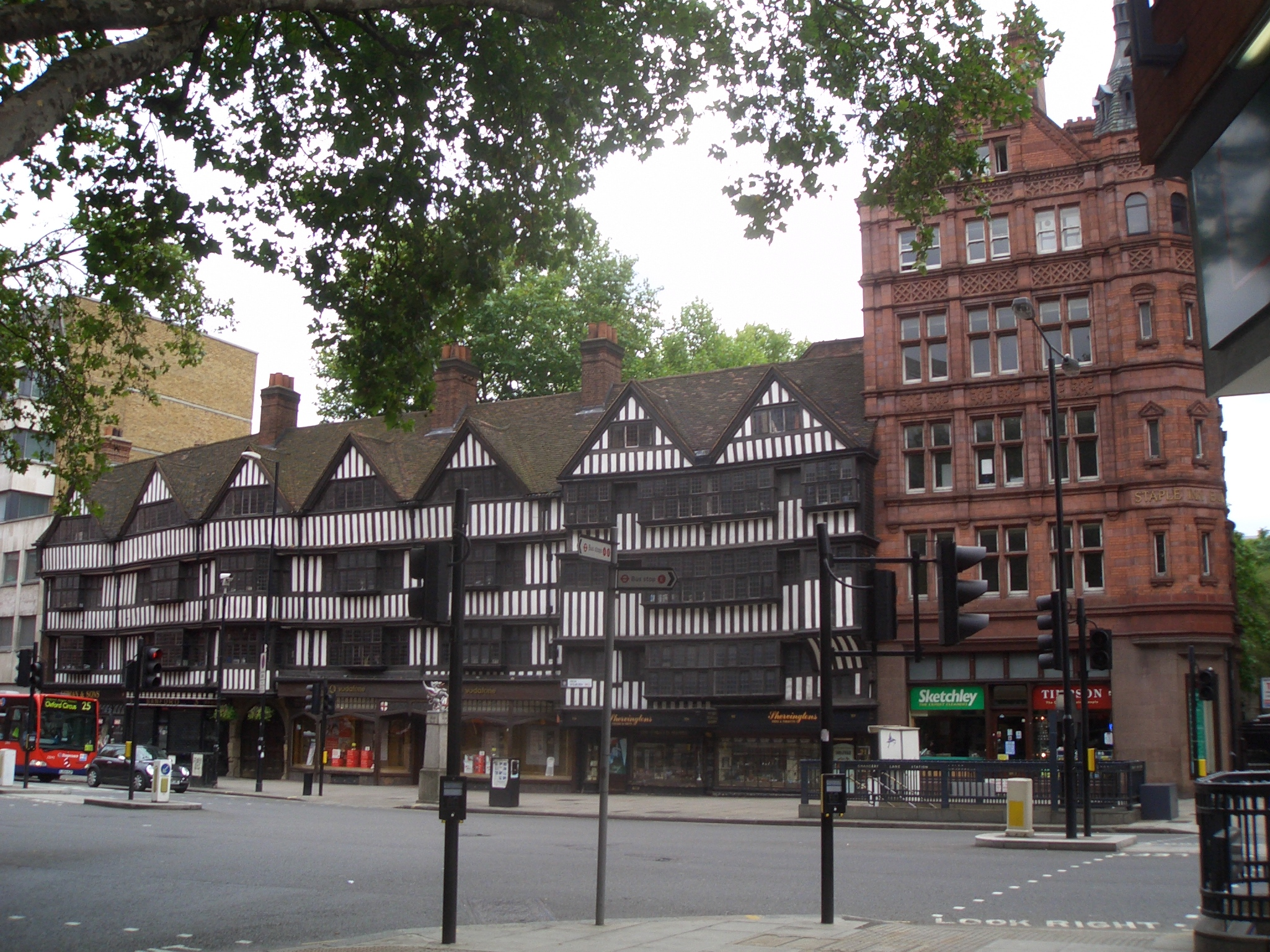
Staple Inn after Waterhouse's restoration, with reconstructed windows, his Staple Inn Buildings is on the right

The Prudential Assurance Company acquired Staple Inn that is sited nearly opposite their Holburn Bars headquarters. They paid £68,000 for it in November 1886. In early December Waterhouse was asked to survey the building and come with a proposal to repair the Inn, while preserving its character. Work commenced in 1887, the plaster that had hidden the half-timbering since the 1660s was stripped off, and the sash windows replaced with wooden mullioned windows more appropriate for an Elizabethan building built 1586. The Society for the Protection of Ancient Buildings attempted to stop this, but failed. Internally the only major change was the insertion of five tie rods into the roof of the Hall. The builders for the work were Holland, Hannen & Cubitts; heating was by W.W. Phipson and D.O. Boyd, with the iron work in the hall by Hart Son Peard & Co. The work cost £9,900.

== Personal life and family ==
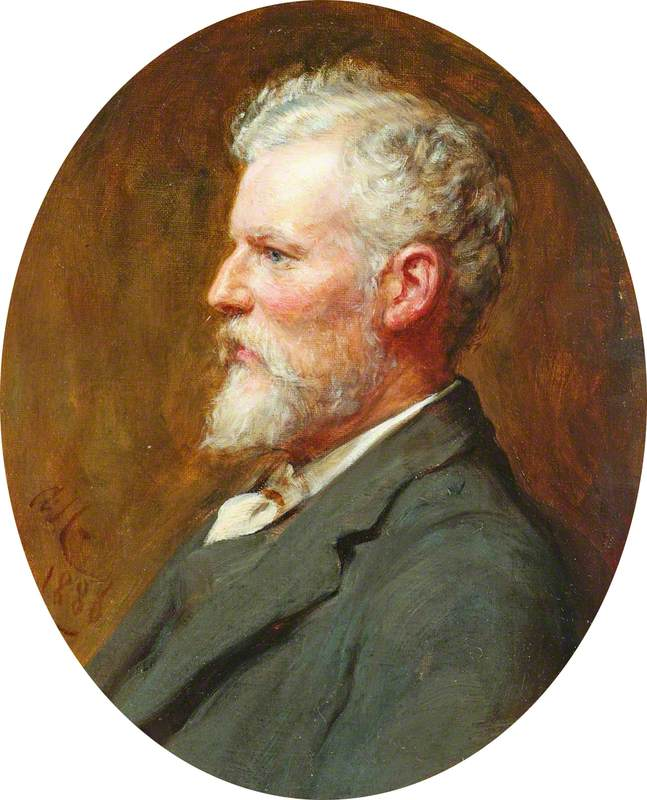
Alfred Waterhouse 1886 by Arthur Stockdale Cope

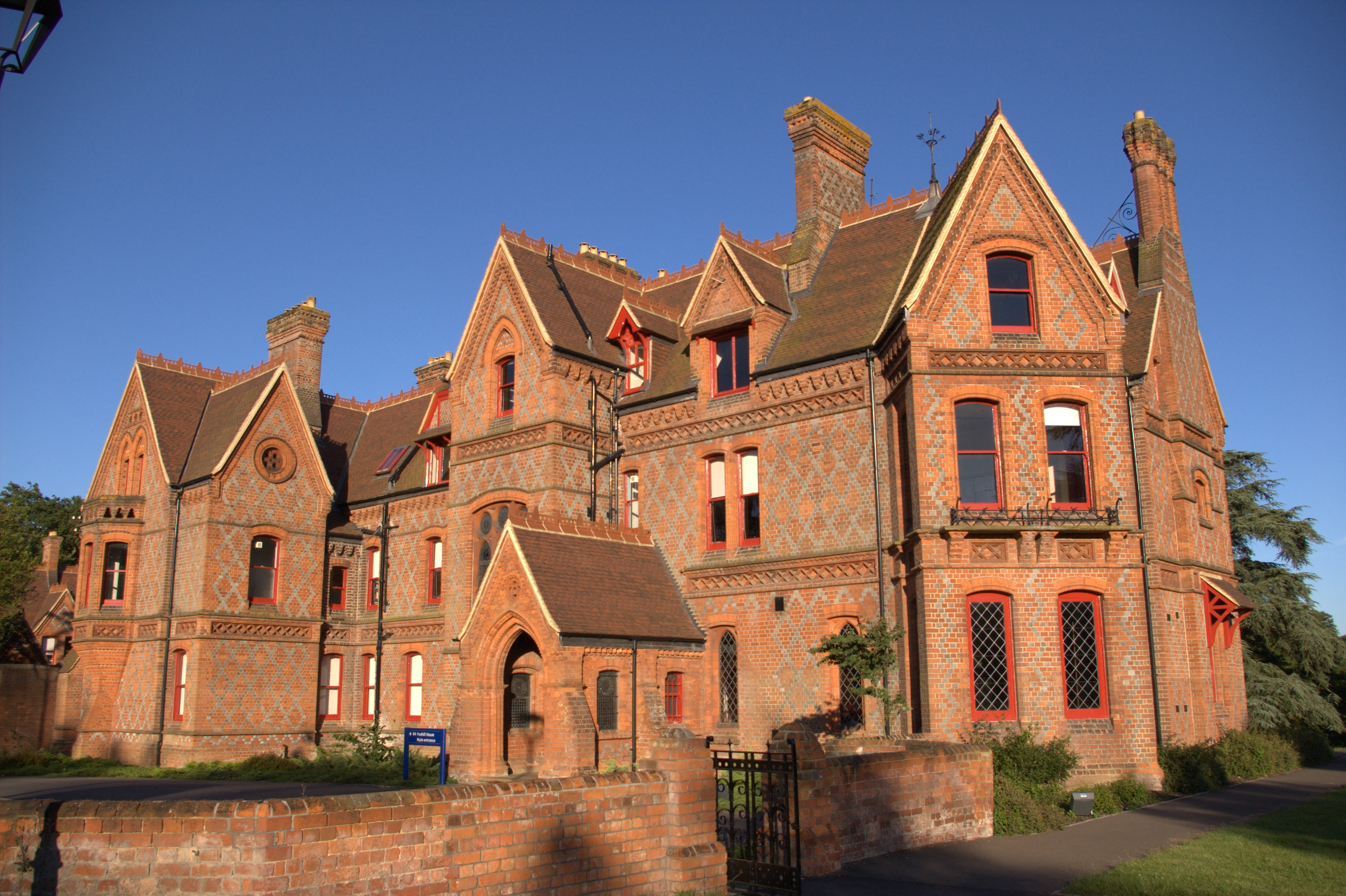
Foxhill House, Reading (1867-68) designed by Waterhouse as his family's country home until 1877 when they moved to Yattendon Court

In 1860 Waterhouse married Elizabeth Hodgkin (1834–1918), who was also a Quaker, daughter of John Hodgkin and sister of the historian Thomas Hodgkin, who was a school friend of Waterhouse. Elizabeth was herself the author of several books, including a collection of verse and some anthologies. Her best known work was The Island of Anarchy, a Utopian story set in the late 20th century, first published in 1887 and more recently re-published by the Reading-based Two Rivers Press. Elizabeth was also an accomplished water-colourist and she and Alfred would often paint together, also she produced designs for embroidery and copper and brass ware in the style of the Arts and Crafts movement. Elizabeth also organised between 1890 and 1914 evening craft classes in Yattendon. She also arranged amateur theatricals at home.

The eldest of the five children the couple had was Paul Waterhouse (1861–1924), after being educated at Eton College and taking a degree in Classics at Balliol College, Oxford he would follow his father's profession joining the practice in 1884, his father made him a partner in 1891. Paul's son Michael Theodore Waterhouse (1888–1968) would also become an architect. In turn Michael's son David Barclay Waterhouse (1921–1998) was the fourth generation to follow the profession retiring in 1989.

Alfred's and Elizabeth's other children were: the pianist (Mary) Monica Waterhouse (1863–1949) who married Robert Bridges in 1884; Florence Eliot Waterhouse (1866–1953); Alfred Maurine Waterhouse (1868-c.1881) and Amyas Theodore Waterhouse (1872–1956).

In 1877 Alfred, Elizabeth and Paul changed their faith, all were baptised into the Church of England, the four younger children were baptised a few months later.

Alfred's great-granddaughter Prudence Waterhouse (daughter of Michael), also an architect, was joint author with architectural historian Colin Cunningham of Alfred Waterhouse 1830–1905 Biography of a Practice published in 1992 by Oxford University Press.

Waterhouse designed his own house in 1860, Barcombe Cottage, Fallowfield, Manchester. The purchase of 8 (now 61) New Cavendish Street, Marylebone, London, a late eighteenth-century Georgian terraced house was negotiated in the autumn of 1864, preparatory to his relocating in 1865 to London. Waterhouse went on to design the Gothic Foxhill House (1867–68), Reading, as the family's first country residence. The site was next door to his parents' house, Whiteknights House. In 1877 he built the even grander Yattendon Court near Yattendon for £11,865 (approximately £1,400,000 in 2019). Waterhouse's grandson sold Yattendon Court to Edward Iliffe, 1st Baron Iliffe, and it was demolished and replaced by the current house in 1926. After moving to Yattendon Waterhouse sold Foxhill. In the village of Yatton Waterhouse designed and paid for several buildings: a Reading Room and caretaker's cottage (1877) cost £570; several cottages, village shop and farm buildings (c.1878–1900); alterations to the parish church including a new porch, vestry, new altar and organ, and partial rebuilding of the tower (1881) cost £370; a new village school (1885–86) for £2,077.

Friends of Alfred and Elizabeth who regularly stayed at Yattendon included Hamo Thornycroft and Edmund Gosse; they also let the old manor house at Yattendon to their future son-in-law Robert Bridges. In the spring each year the Waterhouses held regular Thursday night dinners at their London house in New Cavendish Street. Guests included Hamo Thornycroft, his sister Theresa Thornycroft, Edmund Gosse, Frank Dicksee, Lawrence Alma-Tadema, Ford Madox Brown, Mary Augusta Ward, Benjamin Jowett, James Bryce, 1st Viscount Bryce and his sister Julia Gaskell. Alfred was a friend of fellow architects Richard Norman Shaw and William Burges. In 1861 Shaw designed a wooden cradle for the newly born Paul Waterhouse. It is now in the V&A Museum. He had been a guest of the Foreign Architectural Book Society, founded in 1859, it was restricted to fifteen members, so it was only on the death of Burges in 1881 that Waterhouse could join. Other members included William Eden Nesfield, John Norton, Arthur Blomfield, John Loughborough Pearson & George Devey.

Hamo Thornycroft spent the Christmas of 1882 at Yattendon, on 23 December he wrote to his future wife Agatha Cox:

Being a well ordered house the family and the guests retire at the hour of eleven, so I am writing to you in my room seated before a jolly fire, anxious to tell you of the two days' sport, for we have been cover shooting and you will be glad to hear no one was 'peppered' except 98 head of game. This is such a charming house to be in that I feel I may never weary of talking of it. Life is made so pleasant that it becomes precious! Intellectually and physically one feels better for every hour one is here. Everyone is courteous, kind and intelligent, and conversation so bright and happy....After a charming dinner and a menu intellectuelle (but is menu m. or f. ?) we had music and then a chat about the great hall fire, like all fires here, on the hearth. The bedrooms have such names as these 'Valour', 'Hope', 'Courage'. I am in 'Honour', - Is it not a nice idea? Much better than 'blue', 'red' or 'yellow' room or 1,2,3. It is pleasant to find both the Carol singers and the Mummers are still in existence here...

In 1865 Waterhouse took a three week holiday in the Loire Valley, from which forty of his sketches survive. In the spring of 1870 the family holidayed in Italy, followed by winter holidays in Rome during 1873 and 1874. Often during August the family would take an Alpine holiday. Other foreign trips included in 1884 Sicily, Norway in 1886 and in 1890 Spain.

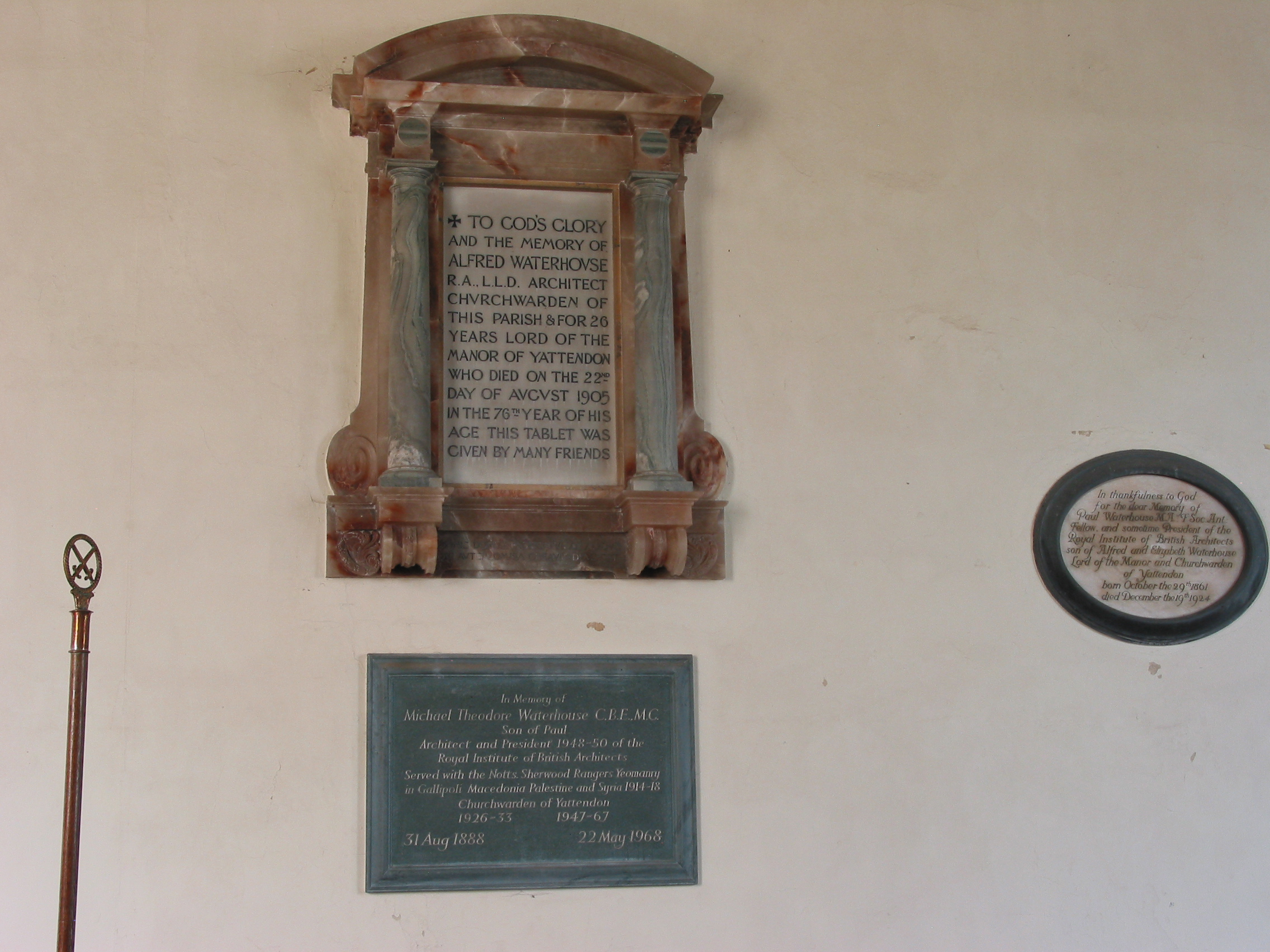
The memorial to Waterhouse in the church of St Peter and St Paul, Yattendon, Berkshire.

Waterhouse suffered a stroke in 1901, leading to his retirement from architecture in 1902, having practised in partnership with his son, Paul Waterhouse, from 1891, his son took over the practice. He died at Yattendon Court on 22 August 1905. The Building News's obituary described Alfred as "genial, cheery, and yet modest and unassuming demeanor" which had "won him a wide circle of friends within and without the profession".

== Recognition and professional life ==
Waterhouse became a fellow of the Royal Institute of British Architects in 1861, and was president from 1888 to 1891. Waterhouse's presidential address included the following:

We have heard something lately of the conflicting terms 'professional man' and 'artist' as applied to the architect. Now in my opinion the true architect is both. The higher and more systematic education which we are hoping for and getting will train us in the efficient and easy practice of our profession - a profession which is open to all men of education, intelligence and industry, and one in which the greatest successes will attend those to whom a further artistic perception has been given and in whom it has been carefully nurtured.

He was awarded a rappel to the grand prix for architecture at the Paris Exposition of 1867. In 1878 he received the Royal Gold Medal of the Royal Institute of British Architects. Waterhouse first exhibited one of his designs at the Royal Academy of Arts in 1857, and then from 1868 to 1901 with the exception of 1873 he exhibited mainly designs of his own buildings annually. But in later years he sometimes exhibited topographical views from both his British and European travels. Waterhouse was made an associate of the Royal Academy on 16 January 1878, of which body he became a full member on 4 June 1885. His diploma piece is an 1887 pen and ink drawing with colour washes, a perspective of the main facade of Manchester Town Hall and he was the Royal Academy's treasurer from 17 November 1897 to 5 December 1901. He was also a member of the academies of Vienna (1869), Brussels (1886), Antwerp (1887), Milan (1888) and Berlin(1889), and a corresponding member of the Institut de France (1893). In 1895 Victoria University of Manchester, made Waterhouse an LL.D.

Starting in 1864 with Congleton Town Hall won by Edward William Godwin, he was constantly called upon to act as assessor in architectural competitions. By the time of the last competition he assessed in 1899 for Cartwright Hall, Bradford won by John William Simpson and E.J. Milner Allen, a total of sixty. The more notable include: Plymouth Guildhall selected 1869 the design by Edward William Godwin; Barrow-in-Furness Town Hall 1877, selected the design by William Henry Lynn; Victoria Law Courts, Birmingham 1886, selected the design by Ingress Bell and Aston Webb; He was a member of the international jury appointed to adjudicate on the designs for the west front of Milan Cathedral in 1887; Sheffield Town Hall 1889 design by Edward William Mountford; The Victoria and Albert Museum, then known as the South Kensington Museum 1891 selected the design by Aston Webb; Belfast City Hall 1896 design by Brumwell Thomas and City Hall, Cardiff 1897 by Lanchester, Rickards and Stewart.

Architects who received their training in Waterhouse's office included: George Tunstal Redmayne (1840–1912) articled (1859–63) who married Waterhouse's sister Katherine in 1870; Issac Steane d.1908. articled (1863–72); William Edward Willink (1856–1924) articled 1873; Winter Hargreaves Raffles (b.1862 or 63) articled (1883–87); Paul Waterhouse articled (1884–87); Frank Albert Whitwell (1871–1943) articled 1891.

In 1887 Building News magazine ran a poll of who was considered Britain's leading living architect. Waterhouse received over ninety percent of the votes.

In 1890 he served as architectural member of the Royal Commission on the proposed enlargement of Westminster Abbey as a place of burial.

The JD Wetherspoon pub on Princess Street, Manchester, is named "The Waterhouse" after Alfred Waterhouse.

== List of architectural work ==
The names of the buildings and the names of the county they are located in, both in the lists and gallery, are those in use when Waterhouse designed the buildings.

- List of ecclesiastical works by Alfred Waterhouse
- List of domestic works by Alfred Waterhouse
- List of educational buildings by Alfred Waterhouse
- List of commercial buildings by Alfred Waterhouse
- List of public and civic buildings by Alfred Waterhouse

== See also ==
- Architectural terracotta
- Burmantofts Pottery
