= List of domestic works by Alfred Waterhouse =

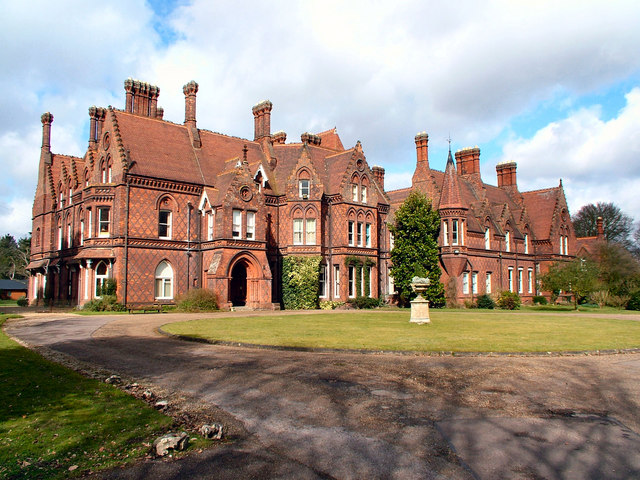
Easneye House

Alfred Waterhouse (1830–1905) was a prolific English architect who worked in the second half of the 19th century. His buildings were largely in Victorian Gothic Revival style. Waterhouse's biographer, Colin Cunningham, states that between about 1865 and about 1885 he was "the most widely employed British architect". He worked in many fields, designing commercial, public, educational, domestic, and ecclesiastical buildings.

Waterhouse was born in Liverpool of Quaker parents. After being articled to Richard Lane in Manchester, he took a ten-month tour of the Continent, then established his own practice in Manchester. Many of his early commissions came from Quakers and other nonconformist patrons. He came to national recognition when he won a competition for the design of Manchester assize courts. His next major public commissions in Manchester were for Strangeways Gaol and Manchester Town Hall. In 1865 he opened an office in London, which was followed by his first major commission in London, the Natural History Museum. Meanwhile he was also designing country houses. Here his major work was the rebuilding of Eaton Hall in Cheshire for the 1st Duke of Westminster, which was "the most expensive country house of the [19th] century". He also designed educational buildings including schools and works for the universities of Cambridge, Oxford, Manchester, and Liverpool. In the commercial field, he designed banks, and offices for insurance and assurance companies, especially the Prudential Assurance Company, for whom he built 27 buildings.

Waterhouse's success came from "a thoroughly professional approach rather than on brilliance or innovation as a stylist". He paid particular attention to detail and, although he designed many major buildings, he still accepted smaller commissions. Although most of his work was in the Gothic Revival style, he also employed other styles, including Romanesque and French Renaissance. He used many building materials, but is noted for his use of red brick and terracotta. The use of these materials for many university buildings in the north of England is a major factor in their being termed "red brick universities". In addition to his design work as an architect, Waterhouse was an assessor for about 60 architectural competitions. He was awarded the Royal Gold Medal of the Royal Institute of British Architects in 1878 for his design for Manchester Town Hall, and was president of that institution from 1888 to 1891. He was gained international diplomas, and in 1895 was awarded an honorary LL.D by Manchester University. Waterhouse was also a painter, exhibiting 80 watercolours at the Royal Academy. He suffered a stroke in 1901, and died in his home at Yattendon, Berkshire, in 1905. His practice was continued by his son Paul, followed by his grandson, Michael, and his great-grandson. His estate at death amounted to over £215,000 (equivalent to £29,160,000 as of 2023).

Throughout his career, Waterhouse designed houses ranging in size from the largest in the country to small cottages. They included country houses, rectories and vicarages, and associated structures such as lodges, stables, gatehouses, and accommodation for estate workers. This list includes the major structures in this category, most of which are listed buildings.

== Key ==
Grade (England and Wales)	Criteria
Grade I	Buildings of exceptional interest, sometimes considered to be internationally important.
Grade II*	Particularly important buildings of more than special interest.
Grade II	Buildings of national importance and special interest.
Category (Scotland)	Criteria
Category A	Buildings of special architectural or historical interest which are outstanding examples of a particular period, style or building type.
Category B	Buildings of special architectural or historic interest which are major examples of a particular period, style or building type.
Category C(S)	Buildings of special architectural or historic interest which are representative examples of a period, style or building type.
"—" denotes a work that is not graded.

== Buildings ==
Name	Location	Photograph	Date	Notes	Grade
Rothay Holme	Ambleside, Cumbria	—	1854	Waterhouse's first new build; a country house for Elizabeth Head. Extended in 1890.	—
Hinderton Hall	Neston, Cheshire; 53.2982°N 3.0437°W		1856	A country house built for Christopher Bushell, a Liverpool wine merchant in sandstone with a green slate roof. It has two storeys and a tower.	II
Main Lodge, Hinderton Hall	Neston, Cheshire; 53.2992°N 3.04682°W		c. 1856	Built in sandstone with a green slate roof in a cruciform plan.	II
Back Lodge, Hinderton Hall	Neston, Cheshire; 53.2987°N 3.0409°W		c. 1856	Built in sandstone with a green slate roof in an L-shaped plan.	II
Quarry Lodge, Hinderton Hall	Neston, Cheshire; 53.2958°N 3.0382°W		c. 1856	Built in sandstone with a green slate roof in an L-shaped plan.	II
Fawe Park	Keswick, Cumbria; 54.5943°N 3.1560°W	—	1856–58	A country house for James Bell overlooking Derwentwater. Its sitting room is on the top floor to take advantage of the view.	—
Elleray Bank	Windermere, Cumbria	—	1856–61	An Italianate house for G. G. Cunningham.	—
Vicarage	Blackmoor, Selborne, Hampshire; 51.0940°N 0.8867°W	—	c. 1860	Built in stone with a tiled roof and brick chimneystack. It has two storeys and attics.	II
Mission Hall Cottage	Wareside, Hertfordshire; 51.8104°N 0.0062°E	—	1860s	Cottages and estate office as part of the Easneye Estate. T-shaped in brick with two storeys.	II
Reading room and teacher's house	Allonby, Cumbria; 54.7748°N 3.4300°W	—	1861	Built for the Quaker Joseph Pease.	—
New Heys	Allerton, Liverpool, Merseyside; 53.3701°N 2.8900°W		1861–65	A suburban mansion for the lawyer W. G. Bateson. It is built in polychromatic brick with slate roofs, and was later divided into apartments.	II
Rockliffe Hall	Hurworth-on-Tees, County Durham; 54.4784°N 1.5446°W	—	1863–65	Built as a country house for Alfred Backhouse, in the 20th century it was used as a hospital, and later as a hotel. It is a red brick building with slate roofs.	II
Bankhead	Broxton, Cheshire; 53.0862°N 2.7661°W	—	1864	Used as a dower house for the Bolesworth Estate. It has an irregular plan, and is constructed in brick with sandstone dressings and a tiled roof.	II
Stable and coach house, Bankhead	Broxton, Cheshire; 53.0865°N 2.7658°W	—	1864	Built for the Bolesworth Estate. A single-storey L-shaped building in red brick with tiled roofs.	II
Thelwall Heys	Grappenhall and Thelwall, Cheshire; 53.3763°N 2.5332°W	—	1864	A country house in red-brown brick with yellow and blue brick banding, sandstone dressings, and a slate roof.	II
Goldney House	Clifton, Bristol; 51.4529°N 2.6144°W		1864–65	A house dating from about 1720, re-cased, altered and extended. Later used as student accommodation.	II
Hutton Hall	Guisborough, North Yorkshire; 54.5224°N 1.0755°W		1864-71	A large country house for J. W. Pease. It is a brick building with slate roofs. The frontage is of seven bays, and the building in High Victorian style. Associated with the house are a kitchen courtyard, a conservatory, and a gatehouse.	II
Benwell Dene	Newcastle upon Tyne; 54.9726°N 1.6696°W	Colour photograph of Benwell Dene	1865	This originated as the home of Dr Thomas Hodgkin, who later gave the house to the Royal Victoria School for the Blind. It is constructed in sandstone and has a slate roof. The building is in two storeys with attics.	II
Lodge, Benwell Dene	Newcastle upon Tyne; 54.9729°N 1.6691°W	—	1865	A sandstone house with a slate roof in one storey.	II
Gate lodge to Easneye	Stanstead Abbots, Hertfordshire; 51.7955°N 0.0040°E	—	1866	The lodge contains two houses.	II
Easneye	Stanstead Abbots, Hertfordshire; 51.8026°N 0.0010°E		1867–68	Built as a country house for Thomas Fowell Buxton, it is constructed in red brick with black brick diapering, and has tiled roofs. Its plan is asymmetrical in three blocks. It has been used later as a college.	II*
Stables to Easneye	Stanstead Abbots, Hertfordshire; 51.8030°N 0.0007°E	—	1868	An L-shaped building in red brick with a tiled roof.	II
Allerton Priory	Liverpool, Merseyside; 53.3697°N 2.8828°W		1867–70	A mansion built for the colliery owner John Grant Morris. It is a large asymmetrical house in two storeys with an attic, constructed in red brick with bands in blue brick and stone, stone dressings, and a tiled roof. It was later used as a school, and then converted into apartments.	II*
Lodge to Allerton Priory	Liverpool, Merseyside; 53.3684°N 2.8879°W		1867–70	A two-storey house in brick with a timber-framed gable.	II
Chowley Lodge	Chowley, Cheshire; 53.1005°N 2.7766°W		1868	It is constructed in sandstone with a slate roof. It consists of a castellated entrance with wrought iron gates in an archway, and is attached to a cottage.	II
Foxhill House	Earley, Berkshire; 51.4453°N 0.9419°W		1868	A house built by Waterhouse for himself, in brick with much diapering. It is in two storeys with an attic, and has since been used as a students' hall of residence.	II*
Stables and coach house, Foxhill House	Earley, Berkshire; 51.4455°N 0.9416°W		1868	Built by Waterhouse for himself, in red brick with blue brick diapering. It is in two storeys with an L-shaped plan. Since used as a students' accommodation.	II
Farmhouse and dairy	Stanstead Abbots, Hertfordshire; 51.8059°N 0.0055°E	—	c. 1868	A T-plan two-storey house in brick with tiled roofs.	II
Mossley House	Mossley Hill, Liverpool, Merseyside; 53.3803°N 2.9254°W		1868–69	Built as a mansion for Lloyd Rayner, later incorporated into Mossley Hill Hospital. It is a large, square house constructed in polychromatic brick, and in Gothic style.	II
Old Vicarage	Bakewell, Derbyshire; 53.2119°N 1.6799°W	—	1869	A house in limestone with sandstone dressings and a tiled roof. It has two storeys and an attic. Later used as a residential home.	II
Blackmoor House	Selborne, Hampshire; 51.0899°N 0.8878°W	—	1869	A country house with extensions added in 1882, for Roundell Palmer, 1st Earl of Selborne. The house has since been divided into flats.	II*
South Lodge, Blackmoor House	Selborne, Hampshire; 51.0859°N 0.8806°W	—	1869	Lodge for Blackmoor House.	II
Coldhayes	Steep, Hampshire; 51.0368°N 0.9224°W	—	1869	A country house in limestone with Bath stone dressings and a tiled roof.	II*
Stables, Coldhayes	Steep, Hampshire; 51.0373°N 0.9223°W	—	1869	A range of buildings round a courtyard with an arched entrance at the corner. Built in limestone with Bath stone and tiled roofs.	II
Coachhouse and stables, Blackmoor House	Selborne, Hampshire; 51.0859°N 0.8806°W	—	c. 1869	Buildings around three sides of a courtyard, later converted for residential use.	II
Merlewood	Langham Road, Bowdon, Greater Manchester	—	1869–71	A house in yellow brick with brownish bands.	—
49 Grosvenor Street	Westminster, Greater London; 51.5113°N 0.1488°W	—	1870	A terraced house built in 1725, heightened and altered by Waterhouse. It is in red brick with a slate roof, and has four storeys, a basement, and dormers in a mansard roof.	II
Eaton Hall	Cheshire; 53.1403°N 2.8775°W		1870–82	A major country house for the 1st Duke of Westminster replacing an earlier hall. It was the most expensive British house to be built in the 19th century, costing £600,000. Demolished in 1963.	—
Walls and gates with overthrow, Eaton Hall	Cheshire; 53.1423°N 2.8757°W		c. 1870	A gateway to the walled garden, 12 feet (3.7 m) high, gate piers, and a pair of gates with an overthrow.	II*
Coach House Court, Eaton Hall	Cheshire; 53.1413°N 2.8776°W		1870s	A courtyard for the 1st Duke of Westminster containing a coach house, stables, and a riding school.	II
Lodge, Eaton Hall	Cheshire; 53.1419°N 2.8783°W	—	1870s	A lodge in early French Renaissance style for the 1st Duke of Westminster plus gates, piers and screens.	II
Heythrop Park	Heythrop, Oxfordshire; 51.9352°N 1.4720°W		1871	This originated as a country house in about 1705, designed by Thomas Archer for Charles Talbot, 1st Duke of Shrewsbury. It was badly damaged by fire in 1831, then restored and partly rebuilt by Waterhouse for Albert Brassey. It is in Baroque style, constructed in limestone with slate roofs. It has since been converted for use as a hotel. The wings of the house and garden features are listed separately at Grade II.	II*
Christchurch Vicarage	Reading, Berkshire; 51.4438°N 0.9619°W	—	1871	A brick house in two and three storeys with a tiled roof.	II
18 Lincoln's Inn Fields	Camden, Greater London; 51.5171°N 0.1169°W		1871–72	Built as two houses, later converted into one. In Portland stone with a slate roof. It has four storeys and three gabled dormers.	II
Lodge to the north of Newsham Park Hospital	Liverpool, Merseyside; 53.4224°N 2.9357°W	—	1871–74	A two-storey house in brick with stone dressings and a slate roof.	II
Lingholm	Portinscale near Keswick, Cumbria; 54.5899°N 3.1559°W		1871–75	A country house for the brewer Lt-Col G. F. Greenall at a cost of £15,700. Subsequently extended.	—
Stables at Culver House	Longdown, Devon; 50.7005°N 3.6339°W	—	1872	Stables for a country house.	II
Abinger Manor	Abinger, Surrey; 51.2019°N 0.4070°W	—	1872–73	Originally built in 1688 for John Evelyn, the house was rebuilt by Waterhouse, reusing some of its former materials. It is an L-shaped brick house set on a moated site.	II
Coodham House	Kilmarnock, Ayrshire, Scotland; 55.5612°N 4.5452°W		1872–79	A country house built in 1826–31 to which Waterhouse made improvements and additions for William Houldsworth, including a music room, a conservatory, and a private chapel.	A
Pierremont	Darlington, County Durham; 54.5317°N 1.5700°W		1873	An addition to the home of Henry Pease, since subdivided into separate units.	II
Former Postillion's House, Eaton Hall	Cheshire; 53.1410°N 2.8773°W	—	1873	This was part of the northern wall of Waterhouse's Eaton Hall, the remainder of which has been demolished. It is in the style of a 16th-century château, constructed in stone with a mansard roof surmounted by iron cresting, and containing dormers.	II*
Town Thorns	Easenhall, Warwickshire; 52.4112°N 1.3404°W	—	1873	A country house for Washington Jackson, built in brick with stone dressings. It originally had an east wing and a tower, since demolished. It is in Italianate style. and has three storeys. On the north front is a porte-cochère. The building has since been used as offices.	II
East Lodge to Town Thorns	Easenhall, Warwickshire; 52.4114°N 1.3308°W	—	1873	The east lodge to a country house, built in brick with stone dressings and a slate roof. It has a cruciform plan, and is in Italianate style.	II
Gateway at East Entrance to Town Thorns	Easenhall, Warwickshire; 52.4113°N 1.3305°W	—	1873	Gateway to a country house, built with stone gatepiers and wrought iron gates.	II
South Lodge to Town Thorns	Easenhall, Warwickshire; 52.4099°N 1.3433°W	—	1873	The south lodge to a country house, built in brick with stone dressings and a slate roof. It has a cruciform plan, and is in Italianate style.	II
Southwest Lodge to Town Thorns	Easenhall, Warwickshire; 52.4106°N 1.3486°W	—	1873	The south lodge to a country house, built in brick with stone dressings and a slate roof. It is in Italianate style.	II
Stable Court, Eaton Hall	Cheshire; 53.1412°N 2.8776°W		c. 1873	A building with four ranges enclosing a courtyard; in red brick and half-timbering with tiled roofs, incorporating stables.	II*
Crookhey Hall	Cockerham, Lancashire; 53.9540°N 2.8087°W	—	1874	A country house constructed in sandstone with slate roofs. It is asymmetrical, with a tower and a porte-cochère. Subsequently converted for use as a school.	II
Rectory to St Elisabeth's Church	Reddish, Stockport, Greater Manchester; 53.4385°N 2.1635°W		1874	Part of a development for the mill-owner William Houldsworth, including a school, the rectory, and St Elisabeth's Church. It is a brick building with stone dressings in Gothic style, and has sash windows.	II*
Firwood	Rusholme, Manchester; 53.4562°N 2.2223°W	—	1874–75	A villa for T. R. Heatherington in 2½ storeys with a tower. Later used as part of the Xavier College.	II
Misarden Park	Miserden, Gloucestershire; 51.7791°N 2.0869°W	—	1874–78	Waterhouse made alterations to a large country house dating from about 1620 for Edward Aldam Leatham.	II*
The Brand	Woodhouse, Leicestershire; 52.7166°N 1.2112°W	—	1875	A house for Arthur Ellis, with later additions.	II
Culver House	Longdown, Devon; 50.6998°N 3.6330°W		1875	A country house built in 1836, extended by Waterhouse.	II*
38 Sheffield Terrace	Kensington and Chelsea, Greater London; 51.5056°N 0.1962°W	—	1876	The only surviving town house by Waterhouse. Built in brick with two storeys and a basement.	II
Silwood Park	Blacknest, Hampshire; 51.4087°N 0.6410°W		1876–78	This was built as a country house with stables, it is a brick building with stone dressings and tiled roofs. As of 2012 it is one of the academic campuses of Imperial College, London.	II
Silwood Park Garden House	Blacknest, Hampshire; 51.4151°N 0.6547°W	—	1876–78	A red brick house with a tiled roof, altered in the 20th century.	II
East lodge Silwood Park	Blacknest, Hampshire; 51.4090°N 0.6380°W	—	1876–78	A red brick house with a tiled roof, altered in the 20th century.	II
North lodge Silwood Park	Blacknest, Hampshire; 51.4165°N 0.6497°W	—	1876–78	A red brick house with a tiled roof, altered in the 20th century.	II
South Lodge; Silwood Park	Blacknest, Hampshire; 51.4063°N 0.6423°W	—	1876–78	A building with an irregular plan, in one and two storeys, constructed in red brick with bands in darker bricks.	II
Virginia Water Lodge; Silwood Park	Blacknest, Hampshire; 51.4137°N 0.6398°W	—	1876–78	A red brick house with a tiled roof, altered in the 20th century.	II
Clayesmore School	Iwerne Minster, Dorset; 50.9315°N 2.1962°W		1878	Built as a country house for Lord Wolverton in stone with tiled roofs. It has two storeys with a frontage of nine bays. Later used as a school.	II
Swanmore Park House	Swanmore, Hampshire; 50.9567°N 1.1708°W	—	1878–82	A country house for Charles Myers. Constructed in red brick with painted concrete dressings and tiled roofs. Since converted into flats.	II
Culver Lodge	Longdown, Devon; 50.7029°N 3.6297°W	—	1879	Lodge to a country house.	II
Dryderdale	South Bedburn, County Durham; 54.6927°N 1.8631°W	—	1879	A country house for Alfred Backhouse in French Renaissance style.	II
Dryderdale Lodge	South Bedburn, County Durham; 54.6910°N 1.8566°W	—	c. 1879	A lodge to Dryderdale in sandstone with a T-plan.	II
Belmont School	Abinger, Surrey; 51.1891°N 0.4059°W	—	1879–80	This was built as a country house by G. Redmayne to plans drawn up by Waterhouse for Price Waterhouse, and it was later extended. It is constructed in Bargate stone, with brick dressings. The building has since been used as a school.	II
East Thorpe	Reading, Berkshire; 51.4490°N 0.9599°W		1880	Built as a house for Alfred Palmer in brick with a tiled roof. Later used as a residential students' home, then as part of the Museum of English Rural Life.	II
Estate Office, Eaton Hall	Cheshire; 53.1486°N 2.8756°W		1880	Built as a laundry, this is a two-storey brick building with stone dressings and timber-framed gables.	II
Grotto, Eaton Hall	Cheshire; 53.1410°N 2.8775°W		c. 1880	In simulated stone for the 1st Duke of Westminster.	II
Golden Gates, Eaton Hall	Cheshire; 53.1404°N 2.8791°W		c. 1880	The central gates were made in the early 18th century. Waterhouse added the side gates and screens.	I
Loggia, Eaton Hall	Cheshire; 53.1385°N 2.8756°W		c. 1880	Situated at the south end of the Broad Walk, this is an Italianate structure with three arches between Ionic columns. The central arch contains a Roman altar.	II
Stable court	Iwerne Minster, Dorset; 50.9303°N 2.1943°W	—	c. 1880	Built for the country house of Lord Wolverton. It is constructed in brick with some timber framing. The entrance has a clock tower and a tourelle. Later used as laboratories and dormitories for Clayesmore School.	II
Garden Lodge, Eaton Hall	Cheshire; 53.1443°N 2.8751°W	—	1881	A sandstone lodge for the 1st Duke of Westminster in two storeys with a massive central chimney.	II
North Lodge, Eaton Hall	Cheshire; 53.1441°N 2.8765°W		1881	A stone lodge for the 1st Duke of Westminster with a four-storey circular tower.	II
Gate and posts North Lodge, Eaton Hall	Cheshire; 53.1441°N 2.8767°W	—	c. 1881	A wrought iron simple gate 10 feet (3.0 m) high between complex sandstone gateposts.	II
Parrot House, Eaton Hall	Cheshire; 53.1418°N 2.8746°W		1881–83	This is at the north end of the Broad Walk. It is in yellow terracotta in the form of a circularIonic temple surmounted by a shallow dome.	II
Gates, railings and walls, Eaton Hall	Cheshire; 53.1443°N 2.8748°W		1881–83	The gates, piers, railings and walls are adjacent to Garden Lodge.	II
Lodges, walls and garden building, St Paul's School	Hammersmith, Greater London; 51.4935°N 0.2153°W	—	1881–85	This consists of the master's lodge, the porter's lodge, walls and a circular building in the garden.	II
St Bartholomew's Vicarage	Reading, Berkshire; 51.4541°N 0.9424°W	—	1883	Built as a vicarage to St Bartholomew's Church, in red brick with decorative features.	II
Lodge to Turner Memorial Home	Liverpool, Merseyside; 53.3807°N 2.9574°W		1884	An L-shaped lodge in stone with a tiled roof, in Gothic style located at the entrance of the drive to the home.	II
Buckhold House	Bradfield, Berkshire; 51.4650°N 1.1340°W	—	1884–85	A country house in red brick with diapering and tile hanging, and tiled roofs. Later used as a school.	II
Arnsbrae	Cambus, Clackmannanshire, Scotland; 56.1252°N 3.8212°W	—	1885	A new country house, expanded in 1896. In stone with a slate roof; two storeys plus attic; irregular plan.	B
Lodge, Arnsbrae	Cambus, Clackmannanshire, Scotland; 56.1237°N 3.8230°W	—	1885	A single storey lodge with a slate roof and timber-framed gables.	C(S)
Stables, Arnsbrae	Cambus, Clackmannanshire, Scotland; 56.1255°N 3.8210°W	—	1885	A stone building in a single storey with a slate roof and dormers.	C(S)
Bottom House Lodge	Bradfield, Berkshire; 51.4635°N 1.1440°W	—	1885	A two-storey brick house with a cruciform plan.	II
Gardener's Cottage	Bradfield, Berkshire; 51.4657°N 1.1271°W	—	1885	A two-storey brick estate lodge with a cruciform plan.	II
Lodge, Heron's Farm	Bradfield, Berkshire; 51.4705°N 1.1278°W	—	1885	A two-storey brick house with a cruciform plan.	II
22 Binney Street	Westminster, Greater London; 51.5138°N 0.1506°W	—	1889–91	Part of a terrace, built originally as a minister's house, this is a brick building with terracotta dressings; It has a mixture of Romanesque and Gothic styles.	II
Springfield	Maidstone, Kent; 51.2844°N 0.5160°E		1891	A large irregular house built for the Balston family, owners of Springfield Mill. It is constructed in red brick with yellow brick dressings, and has a tiled roof.	II
School house	Yattendon, Berkshire; 51.4667°N 1.2007°W	—	1891–92	The school house is constructed in red brick with stone dressings and a tiled roof.	II
The Homestead	Yattendon, Berkshire; 51.4664°N 1.1997°W	—	Late 19th century	A red brick house in 1½ storeys with a T-plan, later divided into two cottages.	II
Homestead Cottage	Yattendon, Berkshire; 51.4664°N 1.1993°W	—	Late 19th century	A red brick house with some timber framing.	II
Jasmine Cottage	Yattendon, Berkshire; 51.4664°N 1.1995°W	—	Late 19th century	A red brick house in a single storey.	II

== See also ==
- List of ecclesiastical works by Alfred Waterhouse
- List of educational buildings by Alfred Waterhouse
- List of commercial buildings by Alfred Waterhouse
- List of public and civic buildings by Alfred Waterhouse
