= List of commercial buildings by Alfred Waterhouse =

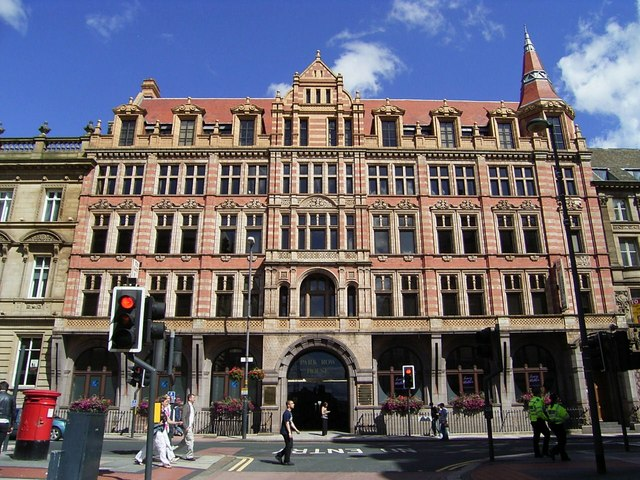
Prudential Assurance Building, Leeds

Alfred Waterhouse (1830–1905) was a prolific English architect who worked in the second half of the 19th century. His buildings were largely in Victorian Gothic Revival style. Waterhouse's biographer, Colin Cunningham, states that between about 1865 and about 1885 he was "the most widely employed British architect". He worked in many fields, designing commercial, public, educational, domestic, and ecclesiastical buildings.

Waterhouse was born in Liverpool of Quaker parents. After being articled to Richard Lane in Manchester, he took a ten-month tour of the Continent, then established his own practice in Manchester. Many of his early commissions came from Quakers and other nonconformist patrons. He came to national recognition when he won a competition for the design of Manchester assize courts. His next major public commissions in Manchester were for Strangeways Gaol and Manchester Town Hall. In 1865 he opened an office in London, which was followed by his first major commission in London, the Natural History Museum. Meanwhile, he was also designing country houses. Here his major work was the rebuilding of Eaton Hall in Cheshire for the 1st Duke of Westminster, which was "the most expensive country house of the [19th] century". He also designed educational buildings including schools and works for the universities of Cambridge, Oxford, Manchester, and Liverpool. In the commercial field, he designed banks, and offices for insurance and assurance companies, especially the Prudential Assurance Company, for whom he built 27 buildings.

Waterhouse's success came from "a thoroughly professional approach rather than on brilliance or innovation as a stylist". He paid particular attention to detail and, although he designed many major buildings, he still accepted smaller commissions. Although most of his work was in the Gothic Revival style, he also employed other styles, including Romanesque and French Renaissance. He used many building materials, but is noted for his use of red brick and terracotta. The use of these materials for many university buildings in the north of England is a major factor in their being termed "red brick universities". In addition to his design work as an architect, Waterhouse was an assessor for about 60 architectural competitions. He was awarded the Royal Gold Medal of the Royal Institute of British Architects in 1878 for his design for Manchester Town Hall, and was president of that institution from 1888 to 1891. He was gained international diplomas, and in 1895 was awarded an honorary LL.D by Manchester University. Waterhouse was also a painter, exhibiting 80 watercolours at the Royal Academy. He suffered a stroke in 1901, and died in his home at Yattendon, Berkshire, in 1905. His practice was continued by his son Paul, followed by his grandson, Michael, and his great-grandson. His estate at death amounted to over £215,000 (equivalent to £29,160,000 as of 2023).

This list contains the notable commercial buildings designed by Waterhouse, and includes such structures as insurance and assurance offices, legal chambers, banks, shops, farm buildings, and warehouses.

== Key ==
Grade (England and Wales)	Criteria
Grade I	Buildings of exceptional interest, sometimes considered to be internationally important.
Grade II*	Particularly important buildings of more than special interest.
Grade II	Buildings of national importance and special interest.
Category (Scotland)	Criteria
Category B	Buildings of special architectural or historic interest which are major examples of a particular period, style or building type.
"—" denotes a work that is not graded.

== Buildings ==
Name	Location	Photograph	Date	Notes	Grade
Fryer and Binyon Warehouse	Manchester	—	1856	The design was based on a practical adaptation of the Doge's Palace in Venice. It has been demolished.	—
Royal Insurance Office	King Street, Manchester	—	1861	An early commercial commission, Waterhouse had his own office in this building for a time. Since demolished.	—
District Bank	Nantwich, Cheshire; 53.0674°N 2.5219°W		1863	A red brick bank building in Gothic style with some diapering in blue brick. It has two gables, one of which contains an oriel window.	II
Barclays Bank	Darlington, County Durham; 54.5254°N 1.5555°W		1864	A stone building with steep slated roofs in three storeys and an attic.	II*
Bassett and Harris Bank	Leighton Buzzard, Berkshire; 51.9163°N 0.6616°W		1866	Built in Bath stone with slate roofs. It has two storeys with an attic and three dormer windows. On the ground floor are five arches, the central one containing an entrance. In the upper storeys are five pairs of rectangular windows.	II
Farm buildings at Easneye Dairy Farm	Stanstead Abbots, Hertfordshire; 51.8062°N 0.0052°E		c. 1868	A U-shaped range of model farm buildings in brick with diapering.	II
16 Nicholas Street	Manchester; 53.4783°N 2.2402°W		c. 1870	Built as a warehouse, later used as shops and offices. In sandstone and red brick with sandstone dressings and slate roofs. Has five storeys and an attic.	II
1a Old Bond Street	Westminster, Greater London; 51.5081°N 0.1400°W		1880	Built as shops and offices in red brick and cream terracotta. It has three storeys and an attic.	II
58 Fountain Street; 60–62 Spring Gardens	Manchester; 53.4802°N 2.2419°W		1882	Built as a manufacturer's warehouse, used later as an insurance office. Constructed in sandstone with a slate roof as a corner block.	II
Cowshed at Heron's Farm	Bradfield, Berkshire; 51.4693°N 1.1329°W	—	1884	Part of a model farm, this is an octagonal timber-framed building with brick infill standing on a brick plinth.	II
Prudential Assurance Building	Liverpool, Merseyside; 53.4078°N 2.9887°W		1885–86	An office building in red brick with dressings in terracotta and granite. It is in five storeys plus an attic in Gothic style.	II
Prudential Assurance Building	Holborn, Camden, Greater London; 51.5182°N 0.1102°W		1885–1901	Built in conjunction with his son, Paul, this building has been extended and changed. The remaining Waterhouse parts are in red brick with terracotta dressings; it has a central tower.	II*
337 and 338; High Holborn	City of London; 51.5180°N 0.1113°W		1886	Two timber-framed chambers dating from 1586, restored by Waterhouse.	II*
4, 5 and 6, Staple Inn	High Holborn, City of London; 51.5180°N 0.1116°W		c. 1886	A terrace of three chambers dating from about 1586, altered in the 18th and 19th centuries, and restored by Waterhouse.	I
Barclays Bank	Durham; 54.7770°N 1.5752°W	—	1887	A stone building with slate roofs, in three and four storeys, with a battlemented parapet.	II
Prudential Assurance Office	Glasgow, Scotland; 55.8633°N 4.2563°W		1888–89	A four-storey building in red brick with stone dressings; French Renaissance style.	B
49 Spring Gardens	Manchester; 53.4804°N 2.2416°W		1888–91	Built probably as a warehouse, later used as offices. Pevsner 2006 ascribes the building to Clegg & Knowles dated 1879 Built in sandstone with a slate roof in eclectic style with Gothic features, it has three storeys, basement, and an attic.	II
Prudential Assurance Office	Manchester; 53.4809°N 2.2444°W		1888–9	Built in red brick and terracotta, since altered.	II
Prudential Assurance Office	Bolton; 53.5776°N 2.4264°W		1889	Built in red brick and terracotta	II
41 Spring Gardens	Manchester; 53.4809°N 2.2416°W		1890	Built for the National Provincial Bank, later used as offices. Built in stone with a slate roof in French Renaissance style, it has three storeys and an attic.	II
Lloyd's Bank	Cambridge; 52.2056°N 0.1215°E		1891	Originally Foster's Bank, this was designed with his son, Paul. It is built in bands of limestone and red brick, and has a tiled roof. It occupies a corner position, and has an elaborate clock tower. Its architectural style is Dutch Renaissance.	II*
Refuge Assurance Building	Manchester; 53.4745°N 2.2408°W		1891	Built as an assurance office, and later extended. It has a steel frame that is clad in brick with terracotta dressings; in four storeys with basements and attics. It has since been converted into a hotel.	II*
12 Mosley Street	Newcastle upon Tyne; 54.9709°N 1.6102°W		1891	Originating as a bank for the Prudential Assurance Company, it is constructed in granite, brick and sandstone with a slate roof in Free early-Renaissance style.	II
Prudential Assurance Building	Cardiff, Glamorgan; 51.4794°N 3.1790°W		1891	An office for the Prudential Assurance Company, it is constructed in red brick and terracotta with a tiled roof. It is in four storeys with a gable, and has a frontage of four bays.	II
Prudential Assurance Building	Portsmouth, Hampshire; 50.7967°N 1.0930°W		1891	An office for the Prudential Assurance Company, it is constructed in red brick and terracotta with a tiled roof. It is in three storeys with an attic, and has a frontage of eleven bays.	II
19 and 20 Park Row	Leeds, West Yorkshire; 53.7991°N 1.5468°W		1891	Built as a bank and chambers in brick with terracotta dressings and a slate roof. Only the façade remains.	II
National Provincial Bank	Piccadilly, Westminster, Greater London; 51.5093°N 0.1358°W		1892–94	Stone-faced bank chambers forming a corner block. The banking hall is on the ground floor with three storeys and an attic with dormers above it.	II
Prudential Assurance Offices	Nottingham; 52.9543°N 1.1497°W		1893–98	Built in brick with terracotta dressings and has a tiled roof, in Flemish Renaissance Revival style. The building was restored and changed in 1991.	II
Prudential Assurance Building	Bradford, West Yorkshire; 53.7937°N 1.7539°W		1895	A three-storey building in Free French Renaissance style.	II
Prudential Assurance Building	Dundee, Scotland; 56.4628°N 2.9701°W	—	1895–98	Designed with his son, Paul, this has three storeys and an attic. It is in red brick with a red tile roof.	B
Prudential Assurance Building	Edinburgh, Scotland; 55.9542°N 3.1917°W		1895–98	Designed with his son, Paul, this has four storeys and an attic, and is constructed in red sandstone. It has an L-shaped plan with a six-stage turret at the corner.	B
Pearl Assurance Building	Liverpool, Merseyside; 53.4083°N 2.9821°W		1896	An office building in brick with a granite ground floor and a slate roof. It is in three storeys with attics, and has an octagonal tower at the corner.	II
Prudential Assurance Building	Sheffield, South Yorkshire; 53.3792°N 1.4704°W		1896	An office and shops, built in brick on a granite plinth with terracotta dressings and a tiled roof; in Renaissance Revival style.	II
Prudential Assurance Building	Huddersfield, West Yorkshire; 53.6446°N 1.7830°W	—	1897–98	This building is constructed in brick and terracotta on a marble plinth, and has a slate roof. It is in three storeys, with an attic.	II
Greek Street Chambers	Leeds, West Yorkshire; 53.7986°N 1.5472°W		1898	Built as a bank and chambers and a porter's lodge. In brick with terracottabanding and dressings and a slate roof.	II
Prudential Assurance Building	Oldham; 51.4540°N 2.1122°W		1898	Offices built in red terracotta and granite, with a slate. It comprises three storeys, and attic and a basement.	II
Prudential Assurance Building	Bristol; 53.5404°N 2.5959°W		1899	Offices built in red terracotta and pink granite, with a slate pyramidal roof. It three storeys, and attic and a basement.	II
Prudential Assurance Buildings	Southampton; 50.906146°N 1.404587°W		1901	A Gothic building in red brick with stone dressings. The upper floors are now converted to 18 residential flats. The ground floor houses two commercial units. The building is adjoined by a c1950's extension to the left of the original office building, now also converted to residential units on the 1st to 3rd floors and a commercial unit at street level.	Locally Listed
Staple Inn Buildings	335–336 High Holborn, City of London; 51.5180°N 0.1116°W		c. 1903	Built as offices, later a shop. It is constructed in red brick with terracotta dressings, and has five storeys. It is in Jacobean style, and has a polygonal turret at its corner.	II

== See also ==
- List of ecclesiastical works by Alfred Waterhouse
- List of domestic works by Alfred Waterhouse
- List of educational buildings by Alfred Waterhouse
- List of public and civic buildings by Alfred Waterhouse
