= List of ecclesiastical works by Alfred Waterhouse =

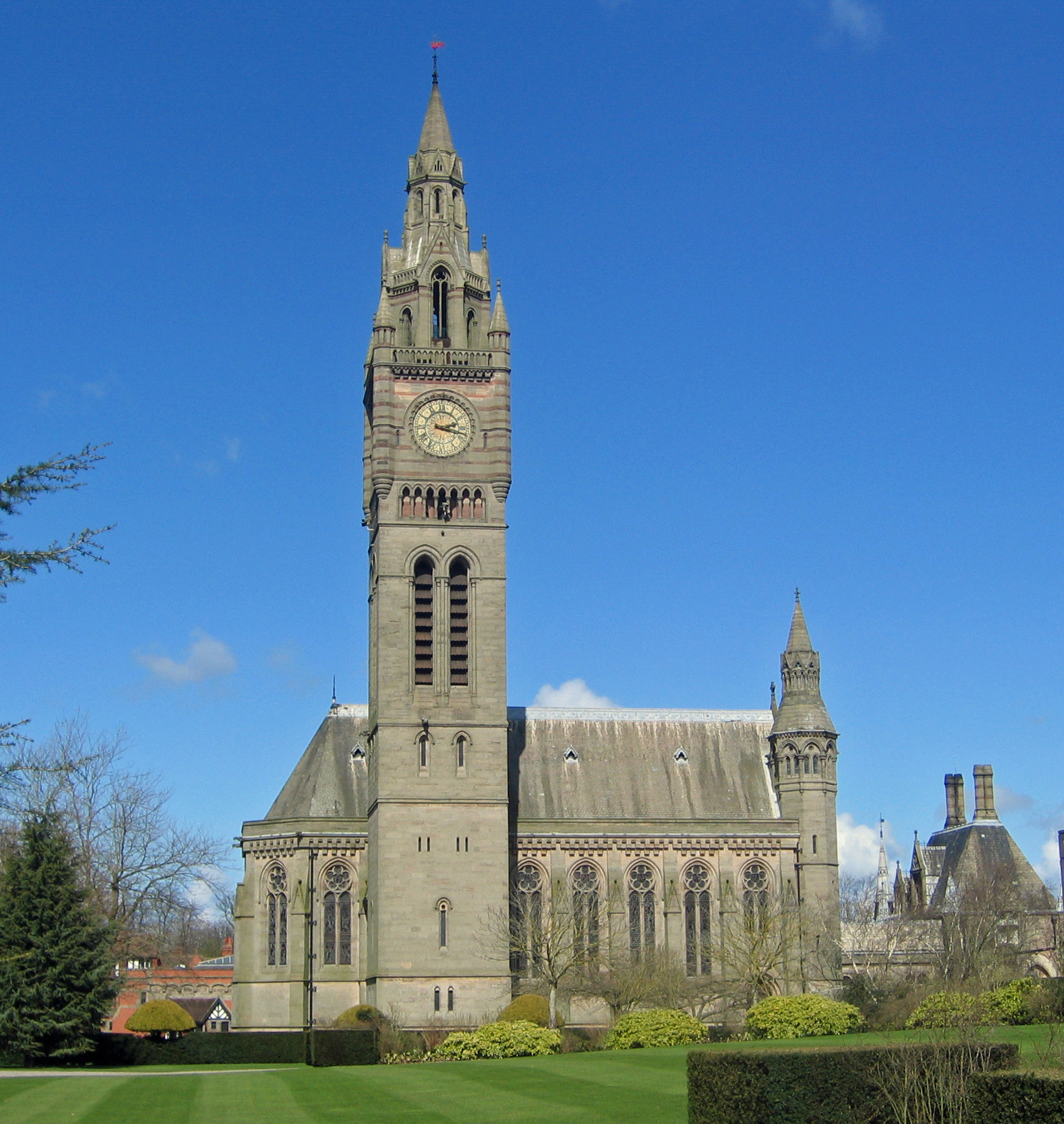
Eaton Chapel

Alfred Waterhouse (1830–1905) was a prolific English architect who worked in the second half of the 19th century. His buildings were largely in Victorian Gothic Revival style. Waterhouse's biographer, Colin Cunningham, states that between about 1865 and about 1885 he was "the most widely employed British architect". He worked in many fields, designing commercial, public, educational, domestic, and ecclesiastical buildings.

Waterhouse was born in Liverpool of Quaker parents. After being articled to Richard Lane in Manchester, he took a ten-month tour of the Continent, then established his own practice in Manchester. Many of his early commissions came from Quakers and other nonconformist patrons. He came to national recognition when he won a competition for the design of Manchester assize courts. His next major public commissions in Manchester were for Strangeways Gaol and Manchester Town Hall. In 1865 he opened an office in London, which was followed by his first major commission in London, the Natural History Museum. Meanwhile, he was also designing country houses. Here his major work was the rebuilding of Eaton Hall in Cheshire for the 1st Duke of Westminster, which was "the most expensive country house of the [19th] century". He also designed educational buildings including schools and works for the universities of Cambridge, Oxford, Manchester, and Liverpool. In the commercial field, he designed banks, and offices for insurance and assurance companies, especially the Prudential Assurance Company, for whom he built 27 buildings.

Waterhouse's success came from "a thoroughly professional approach rather than on brilliance or innovation as a stylist". He paid particular attention to detail and, although he designed many major buildings, he still accepted smaller commissions. Although most of his work was in the Gothic Revival style, he also employed other styles, including Romanesque and French Renaissance. He used many building materials, but is noted for his use of red brick and terracotta. The use of these materials for many university buildings in the north of England is a major factor in their being termed "red brick universities". In addition to his design work as an architect, Waterhouse was an assessor for about 60 architectural competitions. He was awarded the Royal Gold Medal of the Royal Institute of British Architects in 1878 for his design for Manchester Town Hall, and was president of that institution from 1888 to 1891. He was gained international diplomas, and in 1895 was awarded an honorary LL.D by Manchester University. Waterhouse was also a painter, exhibiting 80 watercolours at the Royal Academy. He suffered a stroke in 1901, and died in his home at Yattendon, Berkshire, in 1905. His practice was continued by his son Paul, followed by his grandson, Michael, and his great-grandson. His estate at death amounted to over £215,000 (equivalent to £29,160,000 as of 2023).

Waterhouse designed new churches and restored older churches, although this was not a major field for his work. This list contains the ecclesiastical structures that have been designated as listed buildings in the National Heritage List for England. In addition to new and restored churches and chapels, and buildings related to them, it includes monuments and memorials in cemeteries and churchyards. Waterhouse's most notable designs in this field are the Grade I listed Eaton Chapel, Cheshire, built for the 1st Duke of Westminster, and St Elisabeth's Church, Reddish, Greater Manchester, for William Houldsworth.

== Key ==
Grade	Criteria
Grade I	Buildings of exceptional interest, sometimes considered to be internationally important.
Grade II*	Particularly important buildings of more than special interest.
Grade II	Buildings of national importance and special interest.

== Churches ==
Name	Location	Photograph	Date	Notes	Grade
Cemetery chapel	Ince-in-Makerfield, Wigan, Greater Manchester; 53.5318°N 2.6176°W		1855–57	Roman Catholic chapel in stone with a slate roof. It is in Norman style, with a nave of four bays and a chancel apse.	II
Cemetery chapel	Ince-in-Makerfield, Wigan, Greater Manchester; 53.5323°N 2.6173°W		1855–57	Chapel in stone with a slate roof in Early English style, with a nave of three bays, a short chancel, a north porch, and a bellcote.	II
Kershaw Memorial, West Norwood Cemetery	West Norwood, Lambeth, Greater London; 51.4323°N 0.0986°W	—	c. 1864	Pink and grey granite memorial to James Kershaw.	II
St Martin's Church	Brasted, Kent; 51.2796°N 0.1043°E		1864–65	A church with a core dating from the 13th century. Waterhouse restored it, largely rebuilt the exterior, and added a south chancel chapel and a north vestry.	II*
St John the Divine's Church	Brooklands, Sale, Greater Manchester; 53.4092°N 2.3187°W		1864–68	Waterhouse's first Anglican church, it is constructed in sandstone with a tiled roof in Gothic Revival style.	II*
West Memorial Hall	Caversham, Reading, Berkshire; 51.4672°N 0.9724°W		1865–66	Built as a Baptist Free Church in red brick with blue brick decoration, a stone plinth and dressings, and a tiled roof. It is in Gothic Revival style, with a gable facing the road, and a stair turret on the right leading up to the gallery.	II
Congregational Church	Besses o' th' Barn, Bury, Greater Manchester; 53.5428°N 2.2900°W		1863	In red brick with yellow and blue brick decoration and slate roofs.	II
St Seiriol's Church	Penmaenmawr, Conwy, Wales; 53.2703°N 3.9182°W		1867–68	A new church for English-speaking people in Early English style.	II
St Matthew's Church	Blackmoor, Selborne, Hampshire; 51.0961°N 0.8868°W		1868	A new church for Roundell Palmer, 1st Earl of Selborne. It is constructed in stone, and is in Gothic Revival style.	II*
Spreat Monument, Abney Park Cemetery	Stoke Newington, Hackney, Greater London; 51.5646°N 0.0773°W		1868–72	Monument to John Spreat and his wife in three stages with a pyramidal cap.	II
Eaton Chapel	Eaton Hall, Cheshire; 53.1409°N 2.8776°W		1869–84	A chapel for the 1st Duke of Westminster in sandstone with a slate roof. It has a tall free-standing six-stage clock tower with a pinnacled spire joined to the body of the chapel in the lower two stages. The tower contains a ring of 28 bells. Inside the chapel are mosaics designed by Frederic Shields.	I
Buildings, St Matthew's Church	Blackmoor, Hampshire; 51.096°N 0.8871°W		c. 1870	These consist of a lychgate in Gothic style, a churchyard wall, and a shed.	II
Elworthy Memorial, West Norwood Cemetery	West Norwood, Lambeth, Greater London; 51.4323°N 0.0986°W	—	c. 1871–72	Celtic cross and graveslab to the memory of F. T. Elworthy.	II
Chapel, Reading Grammar School	Reading, Berkshire; 51.448646°N 0.955721°W		1873–74	A Gothic-style church in brick with stone dressings and a tiled roof.	II
Caversham Baptist Free Church	Caversham, Reading, Berkshire; 51.4676°N 0.9726°W		1875–77	A Gothic-style church in brick with stone dressings and a tiled roof. At the southwest corner is a two-stage tower.	II
Memorial, St Mary's Churchyard	Bury, Greater Manchester; 53.5940°N 2.2977°W	—	c. 1875–80	A tomb chest to the memory of John Slagg and members of his family.	II
St Mary's Church	Twyford, Hampshire; 51.0229°N 1.3151°W		1876–78	Constructed in knapped flint with red brick bands, stone dressings, and tiled roofs. The principal donor was Thomas Fairbairn.	II*
St Bartholomew's Church	Reading, Berkshire; 51.4543°N 0.9427°W		1879	The first large-scale Gothic Revival church by Waterhouse. It is constructed in brick and has tiled roofs.	II
Heaton Park Congregational Church	Greater Manchester; 53.5313°N 2.2689°W		1881	Built in brick with slate roofs, in Gothic Revival style. It has since been converted into apartments. Buildings of England Manchester specifically give G.T. Redmayne as the architect	II
St Andrew's Church	Stanstead Abbots, Hertfordshire; 51.7908°N 0.0094°E		1881	Designed for T. F. Buxton of Easneye, this is a new church in Perpendicular style. Hertfordshire Pevsner 2019 claims Zephaniah King as the architect, Historic England says it was Waterhouse. It is a cruciform church with a southwest tower, faced in knapped flint with stone dressings and tiled roofs. The gates and gatepiers to the churchyard, together with the railings and a drinking fountain are listed at Grade II.	II*
St Elisabeth's Church	Reddish, Greater Manchester; 53.4380°N 2.1633°W		1882–83	A new church commissioned by William Houldsworth, a local mill owner. It is constructed in red brick with stone bands and a tiled roof. It has a tower at the east end with a lead spire, and an apsidal chancel with a Lady Chapel to the south and a vestry to the north.	I
Lyndhurst Road Congregational Church	Hampstead, Camden, Greater London; 51.55287°N 0.1697°W		1883–84	Built in purple brick with red brick and terracotta dressings in Romanesque style. It has a polygonal plan, and a hexagonal tiled roof with a central lantern. Since converted into use as recording studios for AIR.	II
St Ann's Church	Manchester; 53.4817°N 2.2458°W		1886–91	A Neoclassical church built in 1709–12, restored by Waterhouse.	I
Former Congregational Church	Westminster, Greater London; 51.5134°N 0.1507°W		1888–91	Built as a Congregational church in red brick with terracotta dressings, with a steeple at the corner, then known as the King's Weigh-house chapel. It has a rectangular plan, with an oval gallery and roof. Later used as the Ukrainian Catholic Cathedral of the Holy Family in Exile.	II*
St Peter and St Paul's Church	Yattendon, Berkshire; 51.4672°N 1.2036°W		1896	Added the spire to a church dating from the 15th century.	I

== See also ==
- List of domestic works by Alfred Waterhouse
- List of educational buildings by Alfred Waterhouse
- List of commercial buildings by Alfred Waterhouse
- List of public and civic buildings by Alfred Waterhouse
