= List of public and civic buildings by Alfred Waterhouse =

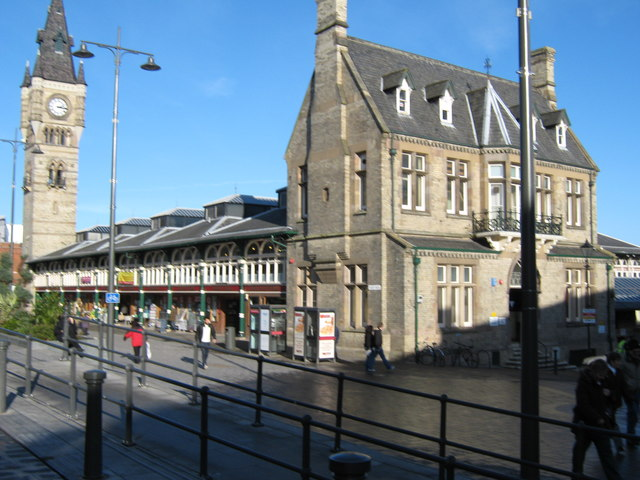
Town hall, market hall and clock tower, Darlington

Alfred Waterhouse (1830–1905) was a prolific English architect who worked in the second half of the 19th century. His buildings were largely in Victorian Gothic Revival style. Waterhouse's biographer, Colin Cunningham, states that between about 1865 and about 1885 he was "the most widely employed British architect". He worked in many fields, designing commercial, public, educational, domestic, and ecclesiastical buildings.

Waterhouse was born in Liverpool of Quaker parents. After being articled to Richard Lane in Manchester, he took a ten-month tour of the Continent, then established his own practice in Manchester. Many of his early commissions came from Quakers and other nonconformist patrons. He came to national recognition when he won success in a competition for the design of Manchester assize courts. His next major public commissions in Manchester were for Strangeways Gaol and Manchester Town Hall. In 1865 he opened an office in London, which was followed by his first major commission in London, the Natural History Museum. Meanwhile he was also designing country houses. Here his major work was the rebuilding of Eaton Hall in Cheshire for the 1st Duke of Westminster, which was "the most expensive country house of the [19th] century". He also designed educational buildings including schools and works for the universities of Cambridge, Oxford, Manchester, and Liverpool. In the commercial field, he designed banks, and offices for insurance and assurance companies, especially the Prudential Assurance Company, for whom he built 27 buildings.

Waterhouse's success came from "a thoroughly professional approach rather than on brilliance or innovation as a stylist". He paid particular attention to detail and, although he designed many major buildings, he still accepted smaller commissions. Although most of his work was in the Gothic Revival style, he also employed other styles, including Romanesque and French Renaissance. He used many building materials, but is noted for his use of red brick and terracotta. The use of these materials for many university buildings in the north of England is a major factor in their being termed "red brick universities". In addition to his design work as an architect, Waterhouse was an assessor for about 60 architectural competitions. He was awarded the Royal Gold Medal of the Royal Institute of British Architects in 1878 for his design for Manchester Town Hall, and was president of that institution from 1888 to 1891. He was gained international diplomas, and in 1895 was awarded an honorary LL.D by Manchester University. Waterhouse was also a painter, exhibiting 80 watercolours at the Royal Academy. He suffered a stroke in 1901, and died in his home at Yattendon, Berkshire, in 1905. His practice was continued by his son Paul, followed by his grandson, Michael, and his great-grandson. His estate at death amounted to over £215,000 (equivalent to £22,600,000 as of 2025).

This is a list of the more notable civic and public buildings designed by Waterhouse, and includes such structures as town halls, clock towers, hospitals, a prison, hotels, a market hall, a museum, and a library.

== Key ==
Grade (England and Wales)	Criteria
Grade I	Buildings of exceptional interest, sometimes considered to be internationally important.
Grade II*	Particularly important buildings of more than special interest.
Grade II	Buildings of national importance and special interest.
Category (Scotland)	Criteria
Category A	Buildings of special architectural or historical interest which are outstanding examples of a particular period, style or building type.
Category B	Buildings of special architectural or historic interest which are major examples of a particular period, style or building type.
Category C(S)	Buildings of special architectural or historic interest which are representative examples of a period, style or building type.
"—" denotes a work that is not graded.

== Buildings ==
Name	Location	Photograph	Date	Notes	Grade
Assize Courts	Manchester		1859–65	Won in a competition, this was Waterhouse's first major commission, It was praised by Ruskin, and it was the stepping stone to further work, but has since been demolished.	—
Market Hall	Darlington, County Durham; 54.5246°N 1.5550°W		1863	A two-storey five bay building with a cast iron framework.	II
Old Town Hall	Darlington, County Durham; 54.5244°N 1.5552°W		1863–64	A two-storey building in brick with a slate roof. The frontage is in five bays, the projecting central bay being canted with a balcony between the storeys.	II
Clock Tower	Darlington, County Durham; 54.5249°N 1.5551°W		1864	A seven-stage tower in brick with stone bands. The top stage contains clock faces with turrets at the corners, surmounted by a slate spire with lucarnes.	II
Boys' Prison Block, Strangeways Gaol	Manchester; 53.4935°N 2.2449°W	—	1866–68	Built as a women's prison. Cruciform plan with a central concourse and radiating wings.	II
Gatehouse, Strangeways Gaol	Manchester; 53.4922°N 2.2457°W		1866–68	Built in brick with sandstone dressings and a slate roof in French Gothic style. It has a central archway flanked by semi-octagonal turrets.	II
Main Block, Strangeways Gaol	Manchester; 53.4935°N 2.2449°W		1866–68	Built in brick with stone dressings in Romanesque style. Consists of a central concourse with six radiating wings.	II
Tower, Strangeways Gaol	Manchester; 53.4935°N 2.2449°W		1866–68	This originally had the dual function of an observation and a water tower. It is built in brick with stone dressings and has an octagonal plan, in the style of a minaret. It is about 365 feet (111 m) high.	II
New University Club	St James's Street, London 51.506934°N 0.139976°W		1866–68	Clubhouse for the New University Club, completed in 1868. The club vacated the premises in 1938, and the building was demolished after the war.	—
Great North Western Hotel	Lime Street, Liverpool, Merseyside; 53.4081°N 2.9789°W		1868–71	Originally the station hotel for Liverpool Lime Street Station, it was later used for offices, then converted into a student hall of residence. It is a stone building in French Renaissance style, with a frontage of 21 bays and is in five storeys plus basement and attic. There are towers on the corners and flanking the three projecting central bays.	II
Town Hall	Albert Square, Manchester; 53.4792°N 2.2442°W		1868–78	A large building with a triangular plan, containing a great hall and offices. Constructed in sandstone in Gothic Revival style. Contains murals by Ford Madox Brown. It cost £775,000.	I
Town Hall	Knutsford, Cheshire; 53.3032°N 2.3741°W		1871	A brick building in two storeys plus an attic. The ground floor has a five-bay arcade. Later converted for commercial use.	II
Newsham Park Hospital	Liverpool, Merseyside; 53.4213°N 2.9349°W		1871–74	Built as the Seamen's Orphanage, it is in brick with stone dressings, and has a slate roof. It has three storeys, and a symmetrical front of 19 bays. To the south is a five-story tower.	II
Building to the south of Newsham Park Hospital	Liverpool, Merseyside; 53.4209°N 2.9337°W		1871–74	The building is connected to the hospital by a later corridor. It is constructed in brick with stone dressings and a slate roof. It is in three storeys with an attic, and incorporates dormer windows.	II
Town council chamber and offices	Reading, Berkshire; 51.4567°N 0.9698°W		1872–75	The building is constructed in red and grey brick with decorations in terracotta. It is in two storeys with an attic and an attached five-storey tower.	II*
Natural History Museum	Cromwell Road, Kensington and Chelsea, Greater London; 51.4962°N 0.1764°W		1873–81	This is the first building to be completely faced in terracotta. It is constructed with an iron frame and has slate roofs. The main front is in 27 bays, the central three of which protrude forward to form a centrepiece. The terracotta is decorated with features such as animals.	I
Gates to Natural History Museum	Cromwell Road, Kensington and Chelsea, Greater London; 51.4956°N 0.1763°W		1873–81	Gates, gatepiers and railings to museum. The railings are in wrought iron, gate piers in Portland stone, some of which are topped by lions.	I
Well house	Yattendon, Berkshire; 51.4668°N 1.2064°W		1876	This was built as a well house, and is now used as a bus shelter. It is timber-framed with a tiled roof, and stands on a brick plinth.	II
Public library	Wigan, Greater Manchester; 53.5442°N 2.6297°W		1877	Built as a free library, later a shop and office, and then a museum. It is constructed in red brick with sandstone dressings and a slate roof. It has a T-shaped plan in Elizabethan Revival style with some Gothic features.	II
Shire Hall	Bedford; 52.1349°N 0.4676°W		1879–81	A red brick building with terracotta dressings. It was extended in 1910.	II
Town Hall	Hove, East Sussex; 50.8280°N 0.1704°W		1880–83	Destroyed by fire in 1966 and replaced by current building opened 1974.	—
Turner Memorial Home	Liverpool, Merseyside; 53.3805°N 2.9565°W		1881–83	Built to care for men who were ill and disadvantaged. It is a large, irregular building in sandstone with a tiled roof, including a chapel.	II
National Liberal Club	Northumberland Avenue, Westminster, Greater London; 51.5062°N 0.1239°W		1884–87	Built as a Liberal club with five and six storeys, in Portland stone with slate roofs.	II*
Rochdale Town Hall	Rochdale, Greater Manchester; 53.6156°N 2.1594°W		1885–87	The town hall was built in 1867–71 to a design by William Henry Crossland. Its tower was destroyed by fire in 1883, and Waterhouse designed a new, smaller tower, linked to the main building by an arch.	I
Liverpool Royal Infirmary	Liverpool, Merseyside; 53.4079°N 2.9678°W		1887–90	Built in brick with terracotta dressings and a slate roof, and incorporating a chapel.	II
Town Hall	Alloa, Clackmannanshire, Scotland; 56.1166°N 3.7952°W		1888	A building in three storeys with a large projecting centre gable and a round-arched entrance in early Renaissance style.	C(S)
Metropole Hotel	Brighton, East Sussex; 50.8215°N 0.1488°W		1890		—
Town Hall	Colne, Lancashire; 53.8566°N 2.1713°E		1894	Designed in the Gothic style and built with ashlar stone. Officially opened on 13 January 1894.	II
Lister Institute of Preventive Medicine	Chelsea Bridge Road, Westminster, Greater London; 51.4863°N 0.1500°W		1894–98	Built in conjunction with his son, Paul, the building was extended in 1909–10. It has since been used as a private hospital named the Lister Hospital.	II
Royal Institution of Chartered Surveyors	Parliament Square, Westminster, Greater London; 51.5010°N 0.1280°W		1896–98	Additions were made by his son, Paul. It is in brick with stone dressings and slate roofs, and has three storeys.	II
University College Hospital	Gower Street, Bloomsbury, Greater London; 51.5241°N 0.1352°W		1897–1906	Built in conjunction with his son, Paul, this is a building with a cruciform plan in red brick with terracotta bands and dressings.	II

== See also ==
- List of ecclesiastical works by Alfred Waterhouse
- List of domestic works by Alfred Waterhouse
- List of educational buildings by Alfred Waterhouse
- List of commercial buildings by Alfred Waterhouse
