= List of educational buildings by Alfred Waterhouse =

Alfred Waterhouse (1830–1905) was a prolific English architect who worked in the second half of the 19th century. His buildings were largely in Victorian Gothic Revival style. Waterhouse's biographer, Colin Cunningham, states that between about 1865 and about 1885 he was "the most widely employed British architect". He worked in many fields, designing commercial, public, educational, domestic, and ecclesiastical buildings.

Waterhouse was born in Liverpool of Quaker parents. After being articled to Richard Lane in Manchester, he took a ten-month tour of the Continent, then established his own practice in Manchester. Many of his early commissions came from Quakers and other nonconformist patrons. He came to national recognition when he won a competition for the design of Manchester assize courts. His next major public commissions in Manchester were for Strangeways Gaol and Manchester Town Hall. In 1865 he opened an office in London, which was followed by his first major commission in London, the Natural History Museum. Meanwhile he was also designing country houses. Here his major work was the rebuilding of Eaton Hall in Cheshire for the 1st Duke of Westminster, which was "the most expensive country house of the [19th] century". He also designed educational buildings including schools and works for the universities of Cambridge, Oxford, Manchester, and Liverpool. In the commercial field, he designed banks, and offices for insurance and assurance companies, especially the Prudential Assurance Company, for whom he built 27 buildings.

Waterhouse's success came from "a thoroughly professional approach rather than on brilliance or innovation as a stylist". He paid particular attention to detail and, although he designed many major buildings, he still accepted smaller commissions. Although most of his work was in the Gothic Revival style, he also employed other styles, including Romanesque and French Renaissance. He used many building materials, but is noted for his use of red brick and terracotta. The use of these materials for many university buildings in the north of England is a major factor in their being termed "red brick universities". In addition to his design work as an architect, Waterhouse was an assessor for about 60 architectural competitions. He was awarded the Royal Gold Medal of the Royal Institute of British Architects in 1878 for his design for Manchester Town Hall, and was president of that institution from 1888 to 1891. He was gained international diplomas, and in 1895 was awarded an honorary LL.D by Manchester University. Waterhouse was also a painter, exhibiting 80 watercolours at the Royal Academy. He suffered a stroke in 1901, and died in his home at Yattendon, Berkshire, in 1905. His practice was continued by his son Paul, followed by his grandson, Michael, and his great-grandson. His estate at death amounted to over £215,000 (equivalent to £29,160,000 as of 2023).

During his career Waterhouse designed buildings for educational use, ranging from village schools, grammar and private schools in whole or in part, and buildings for colleges and universities, the latter including Oxford and Cambridge, and for institutions that later became the universities of Manchester, Liverpool, and Leeds. This list contains the major works in this field.

== Key ==
| Grade | Criteria |
|---|---|
| Grade I | Buildings of exceptional interest, sometimes considered to be internationally important. |
| Grade II* | Particularly important buildings of more than special interest. |
| Grade II | Buildings of national importance and special interest. |
"—" denotes a work that is not graded.

== Buildings ==
| Name | Location | Photograph | Date | Notes | Grade |
|---|---|---|---|---|---|
| Main Building, Reading School | Reading, Berkshire; 51.4478°N 0.9546°W | | 1865–71 | A two-storey building in red brick with blue brick diapering and a tiled roof in Gothic style, To the right of the centre is an octagonal turret with a pyramidal roof. | II |
| Cambridge Union Society Building | Cambridge; 52.2086°N 0.1194°E | | 1866 | Built in red brick with coloured brick decoration and stone dressings. It has a tiled roof with gables and finials. Extensions were added later. | II |
| Brackenbury Buildings | Balliol College, Oxford; 51.7545°N 1.2570°W | | 1867–69 | Part of the frontage of the college on Broad Street in Gothic style. | II |
| Master's Lodge | Balliol College, Oxford; 51.7544°N 1.2578°W | | 1867–69 | Part of the frontage of the college on Broad Street in Gothic style. | II |
| Gonville Court and Caius Court, Gonville and Caius College | Cambridge; 52.2062°N 0.1173°E | | 1868–70 | East range almost completely rebuilt, and other alterations. | I |
| North range, Second Court; Jesus College | Cambridge; 52.2100°N 0.1235°E | | 1869–70 | In red brick with stone dressings in three storeys; Tudor style. Includes a four-stage gate tower with a turret. | II |
| Waterhouse Building, Tree Court, Gonville and Caius College | Cambridge; 52.2061°N 0.1180°E | | 1870 | Two ashlar-faced ranges in the style of a French châteaux with a tall five-storey tower at the corner. | II* |
| Victoria University of Manchester | Manchester; 53.4656°N 2.2347°W | | 1870–88 | West range began 1870, east range (including the Beyer Building) built in 1883–87, north range in 1888, forming a courtyard. Constructed in sandstone with red tiled roofs. | II* |
| Red building, Pembroke College | Cambridge; 52.2013°N 0.1188°E | | 1871–72 | A building in brick with stone dressings, it has an irregular plan incorporating a tower and is in Gothic style. | II |
| Old Master's Lodge, Pembroke College | Cambridge; 52.2023°N 0.1198°E | — | 1871–73 | A two-storey brick building in Tudor style. | II |
| Chemical Laboratories, University of Manchester | Manchester; 53.4650°N 2.2345°W | | 1871–73 | Built in buff brick with stone dressings and a red tile roof. Consisting of one and two storeys over a basement. Contains a lecture hall, two laboratories and other rooms. This is part of the same listing as the Schorlemmer Laboratory (1895). | II |
| Girton College | Cambridge; 52.2284°N 0.0838°E | | 1873 | Built as a residential college for women, it is a red brick building with terracotta dressings and tiled roofs in Gothic style. Additions to the building in 1876, 1883 and 1886, the last including a gatehouse with a tower. There were further additions by Waterhouse's son, Paul, and his grandson, Michael. | II* |
| Waterhouse Building, Trinity Hall | Cambridge; 52.2055°N 0.1159°E | — | 1873 | A three-storey building in 16th-century Flemish style. | II |
| Schoolroom, Chetham's Hospital | Manchester; 53.4861°N 2.2433°W | | 1873–78 | A sandstone building in Tudor style. It is a three-storey building with a four-storey gate-tower in six bays. | II |
| Houldsworth School | Reddish, Stockport, Greater Manchester; 53.4390°N 2.1635°W | | 1874 | Part of a development for the mill-owner William Houldsworth, including the school, a rectory, and St Elisabeth's Church. It is a brick E-shaped building in late Gothic style, with two large gables facing the street. | II* |
| Former Medical School | University of Manchester; 53.4653°N 2.2361°W | | 1874 | An L-shaped building in yellow brick with sandstone dressings. Later used by different departments. | II |
| Buildings surrounding the Old Court, Pembroke College | Cambridge; 52.2019°N 0.1188°E | | 1875 | Waterhouse added the east range and hall. | I |
| Library, Pembroke College | Cambridge; 52.2016°N 0.1194°E | | 1875–77 | A brick building with stone dressings in two storeys and seven bays with a clock tower and spire. | II* |
| High School | Middlesbrough, North Yorkshire; 54.5717°N 1.2358°W | | 1877 | A two-storey brick building with slate roofs in Gothic style. Subsequently part of the campus of Teesside University. | II |
| North Range, Garden Quadrangle | Balliol College, Oxford; 51.7555°N 1.2582°W | | 1877 | | II |
| Great Hall, University of Leeds | Leeds, West Yorkshire; 53.8075°N 1.5547°W | | 1877–1912 | Built originally as the Yorkshire College of Science, the first building of what became the University of Leeds; continued by Waterhouse's son Paul. It is in Gothic Revival style, constructed in red brick and stone, with slate roofs. | II |
| Schoolroom, Chetham's Hospital | Manchester; 53.4862°N 2.2444°W | | 1878 | A sandstone building with a slate roof in Perpendicular style. It is a single-storey building in six bays. | II |
| Oxford Union Society Debating Hall | St Michael's Street, Oxford; 51.7533°N 1.2594°W | | 1878 | Constructed in brick with terracotta dressings, in Elizabethan style. | II |
| St Paul's School | Hammersmith, Greater London | | 1881–84 | With an E-plan, the school was constructed in brick and terracotta in Gothic style. Other than the master's house, it has been demolished. | — |
| Lecture rooms, Gonville and Caius College | Cambridge; 52.2056°N 0.1166°E | | 1883 | Built on the south side of Master's Garden. | II* |
| Grammar school and school house | Guisborough, North Yorkshire; 54.5372°N 1.0475°W | | 1887 | The ground floor is in sandstone, the upper storey in brick, the dressings in yellow terracotta, and the roofs are in slate. Subsequently became part of Prior Pursglove College. | II |
| Walker Engineering Laboratories | University of Liverpool, Merseyside | | 1887–79 | In brick and terracotta. | — |
| 21 Binney Street | Westminster, Greater London; 51.5137°N 0.1506°W | — | 1889–91 | Built originally as a school and hall, this is a brick building with terracotta dressings; It has a mixture of Romanesque and Gothic styles. | II |
| Victoria Building | University of Liverpool, Merseyside; 53.4062°N 2.9665°W | | 1889–92 | Built as the main university building in red brick with terracotta dressings. It is in three storeys with 13 bays, and has a clock tower and a corner turret. | II |
| School House, Leighton Park School | Reading, Berkshire; 51.4372°N 0.9473°W | — | 1891 | Extension of a building at the school. | II |
| School | Yattendon, Berkshire; 51.4668°N 1.2009°W | — | 1891–92 | The school is constructed in red brick with stone dressings, and has a T-plan. | II |
| Thompson Yates Building | University of Liverpool, Merseyside | | 1894–98 | In brick and terracotta. | — |
| Schorlemmer Laboratory, University of Manchester | Manchester; 53.4650°N 2.2345°W | — | 1895 | Built in redbrick in a single storey over a basement. Contains two laboratories. This is part of the same listing as the Chemical Laboratories (1871–73). | II |
| St. Margaret's Clergy Orphan School and Chapel | Bushey; 51.6381°N 0.3621°W | — | 1895–96 | Designed with his son, Paul, this was built for the Clergy Orphan Corporation. It is constructed in brick with terracotta dressings and tiled roofs. The school is in three storeys and attics in an H-plan. The chapel has a four-bay nave, a single-bay chancel, and a short south transept. | II |
| Whelan Building | University of Liverpool, Merseyside | | 1899–1904 | In conjunction with his son, Paul. Initially the Anatomy building; it has semicircular lecture theatres. expressed externally. | — |
| Lecture rooms, University of Liverpool | Liverpool | — | 1901–04 | Completed by his son, Paul. | II |

== See also ==
- List of ecclesiastical works by Alfred Waterhouse
- List of domestic works by Alfred Waterhouse
- List of commercial buildings by Alfred Waterhouse
- List of public and civic buildings by Alfred Waterhouse
