= Craigtoun Miniature Railway =

Railway in St Andrews, Fife, Scotland

Coordinates: 56°19′01″N 2°50′22″W

The Craigtoun Park Railway is a 15 in (381 mm) gauge railway operating on a circular track around part of the Craigtoun Country Park in St Andrews, Fife, Scotland.

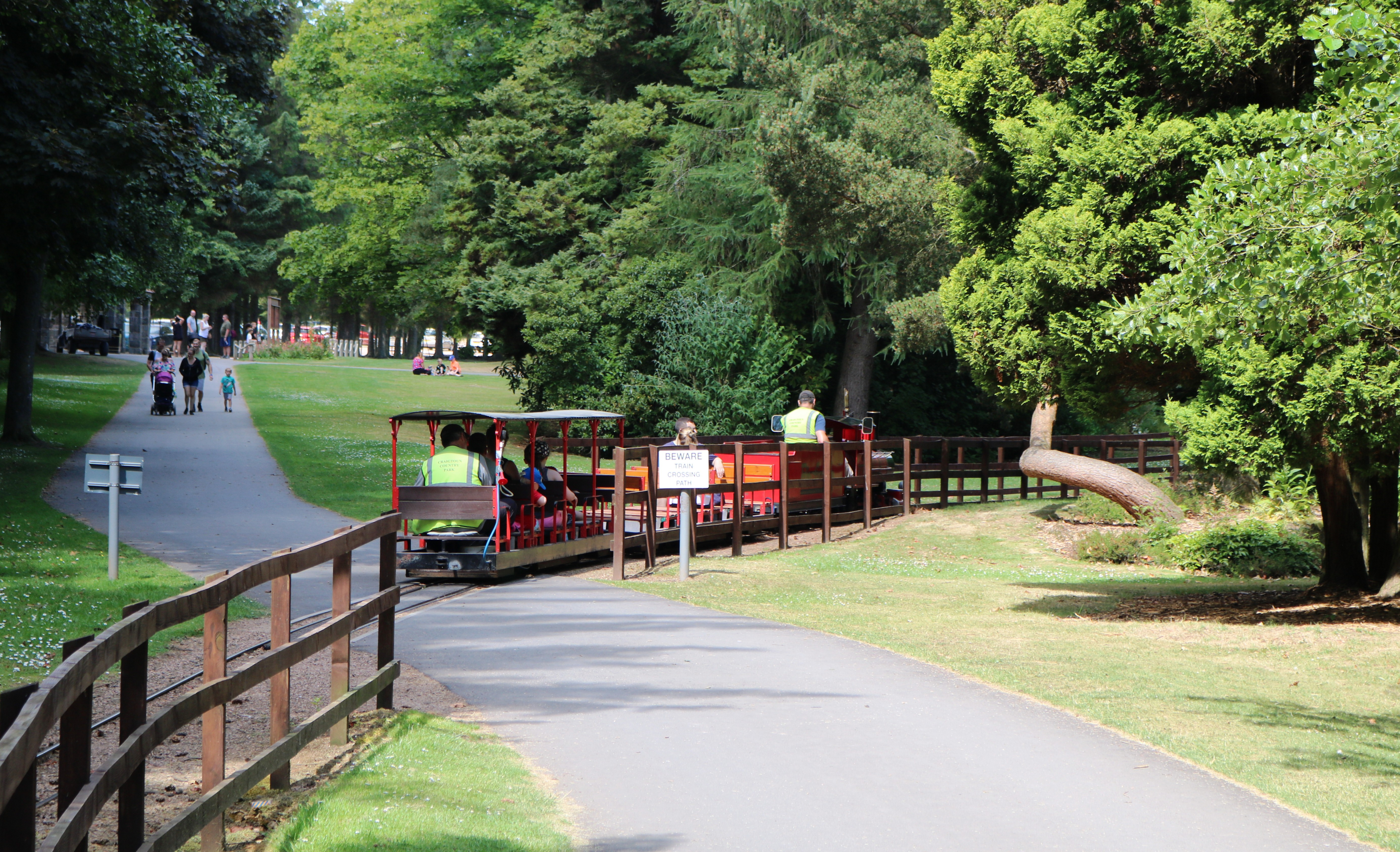

The gauge employed is usually associated with more extensive railway operations, including public transport services on railways such as the Romney, Hythe and Dymchurch Railway in Kent, England. The Craigtoun Park Railway was originally introduced in 1960 as a 7 1/4 in (184 mm) gauge railway, but since 1976 it has been a 15 in (381 mm) gauge railway, and now operates on a circuit of approximately 400 yards (366 m), and purely as an attraction for families enjoying a day out in the public park owned by Fife Council and operated by the voluntary group The Friends of Craigtoun.

The rolling stock, all built by Severn Lamb, consists of two open and one semi-open toast-rack carriages, with motive power provided by a 2-8-0DH steam-outline locomotive built in 1973, designed to resemble a steam locomotive of the Denver and Rio Grande Western Railroad.
