= Michael Waterhouse =

British architect

Michael Theodore Waterhouse CBE
- Born: 31 August 1888
- Died: 22 May 1968 (aged 79); Newbury
- Education: Eton College
- Alma mater: Balliol College, Oxford
- Occupation: Architect
- Spouse: Rissa Barclay (m. 1920)
- Children: David, Jane, Prudence (Puffin) and Caroline
- Parent: Paul Waterhouse

Captain Michael Theodore Waterhouse CBE MC (1888–1968) was a British architect. Waterhouse was the third generation to be President of the Royal Institute of British Architects (1948–1950), following his father Paul Waterhouse and grandfather Alfred Waterhouse.

== Personal life ==
Waterhouse was born 31 August 1888. His father Paul Waterhouse married Palgrave in 1887. Educated at Eton College and Balliol College, Oxford.

He undertook his architectural studies at the Architectural Association, where he returned to become a member of the Council from 1921 to 1924, and the Royal Academy Schools.

On 16 November 1920, Waterhouse married Rissa Barclay (daughter of Hubert Barclay) in London, and they had one son, David, who also went on to be an architect, and three daughters.

== Career ==
In 1912 Waterhouse joined the Inns of Court Officer Training Corps and in 1914 he was commissioned into the Notts Sherwood Rangers Yeomanry and served in Greece and the Near East during the First World War. He was awarded the Military Cross and after the war he commanded a regiment in Syria. In the Second World War he served with the Home Guard.

Waterhouse joined his father Paul Waterhouse into the family firm from 1919 to 1924 and then after his father's death he established his own practice with Cedric Ripley in 1925 called Waterhouse and Ripley. His son David joined the practice in 1956.

Waterhouse became as associate of the RIBA in 1920 and was president of the institute from 1948 to 1950.

He was made CBE in the 1953 Coronation Honours
