= Burnt Hill, Berkshire =

Coordinates: 51°27′54″N 1°11′02″W

Burnt Hill
- Hamlet
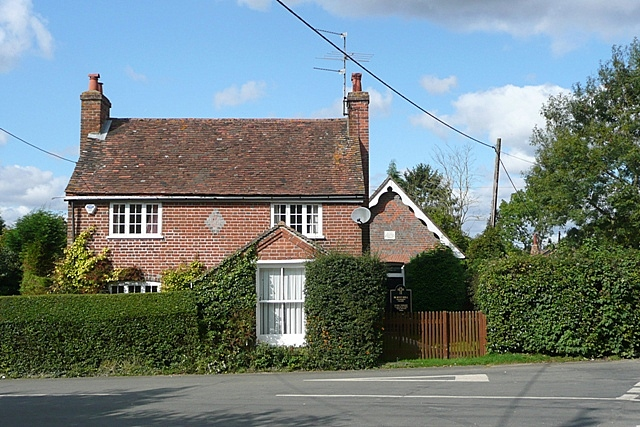
- Burnt Hill Methodist Chapel

- Location within Berkshire
- OS grid reference: SU5574
- Unitary authority: West Berkshire
- Ceremonial county: Berkshire
- Region: South East
- Country: England
- Sovereign state: United Kingdom
- Post town: Thatcham
- Postcode district: RG18
- Dialling code: 01635
- Police: Thames Valley
- Fire: Royal Berkshire
- Ambulance: South Central
- UK Parliament: Newbury

Burnt Hill is a hamlet in Berkshire, England. It is just north of the M4 motorway in West Berkshire, in the civil parish of Yattendon, which is also the closest village, and lies in the North Wessex Downs area of outstanding natural beauty (AONB).

== History ==
Burnt Hill is thought to have been established as a brick making settlement in the 18th century and there were several brick works in the area in the 18th and 19th centuries. The hamlet probably takes its name from the glow in the night sky from the firing of bricks. In 1703 one Isaac Jeram is recorded as working in bricks at Burnt Hill. In the south east of the village is Kiln Pond and, as its name suggests, this was probably a source of clay for the bricks.

=== Swing Riots ===
By 1830, in reaction to the introduction of mechanisation to agriculture, the South of England erupted in what became known as the Swing Riots. Disturbances started in nearby Yattendon and on 21 November a hard core of rioters met at the Axe and Compass, Burnt Hill. After a night at the pub, they acquired a sledge hammer and a horn and at first light set off to local farms to extort money and smash threshing machines, later returning to the Axe and Compass before setting off again at nightfall to other farms in the area. By the early hours of 24 November the troops arrived and arrested eleven of the rioters although none was eventually charged.

== Landscape ==
Burnt Hill is surrounded by fields of the Yattendon Estate, many used for the growing of Christmas trees, for which the estate is well known, and Burnt Hill Common. There was a convoy camp stationed at Burnt Hill Common during World War 2 and concrete foundations of many of the building can still be found in amongst the trees. Combined, Ashampstead and Burnt Hill Commons are 80 hectares (200 acres) of mixed woodland. Until the mid 13th century the Commons were pasture woodland. Subsequently, they were enclosed to form a deer park with a substantial bank and inner ditch that can still be traced for some 5.5 km (3.4 mi). The main street around which most of the village is arranged is named Scratchface Lane, probably referring to the narrow, bramble strewn track it once was.

== Buildings ==
There are some notable buildings in Burnt Hill including the Methodist Chapel of 1864 which is still in use, Burnt Hill House, Burnt Hill Cottage, Wistaria Cottage (now very much extended), Sloe Pightle, a pightleis a small field or enclosure presumably where sloes grew, and Nut & Bolt House formerly the Axe and Compass public house. The Axe and Compass changed its name to the Nut & Bolt Public House in the 1970s, reputedly after the licensees of the time; John and Val Bolton ) According to the West Berkshire Campaign for Real Ale, when the Boltons were asked why they changed the name they said, "Because we are the Bolts and all our customers are nuts!" It is now Nut & Bolt House, a private house.

Nut & Bolt House has two dated bricks in its front facade circa 1834 and 1873 but was a public house from at least 1817 when it was mentioned in the trial of one William Fuller for "stealing, on the 22d of April, one gelding, price 20£.; one mare, price 20£., the property of Edward Shepherd; and one coat, value 15s., the property of Thomas Shepherd" a farmer and his son at nearby Yattendon. John Hope, an acquaintance of the defendant, testified "On the 21st of April, I saw him at the sign of the Compasses, at Burnt-hill, which is about a mile from Mr. Shepherd's; he left there about a quarter after six in the evening." Fuller was found guilty and sentenced to death aged 22.

Later the Axe and Compass was probably a butchers too, when it was licensed to a William Larkcom. After William's death in 1891, it was licensed to his daughter Elizabeth. By 1924 it was still in the Larkcom family, having been taken over by Elizabeth's brother, another William. Other licensees followed: Chas Prince from at least 1928 to 1931 and William George Alsbury from at least 1964 to 1971 Opposite Nut & Bolt House is a building named The Bungalow, although it is not a bungalow. Until around 2010 it was named Compass Pightle, providing a link between Axe and Compass and the use of artisan tools as names and symbols and Sloe Pightle and the now archaic use of the word pightle for a small field or clearing.

At the time of the 1851 religious census, the Primitive Methodists were holding Sunday services in a cottage at Burnt Hill, which was not used exclusively for religious worship. It attracted a congregation of forty. The census return for that Sunday was signed by a local preacher, George Merritt, who lived in Burnt Hill and was an agricultural labourer. In 1864 the Methodist chapel was built and named Zion. It contains a portrait of the Primitive Methodist minister, Isaac Nullis, born nearby at Ashampstead in 1828. Zion is still in use as a Methodist chapel two Sundays a month.

== Nearby towns ==
Newbury, Thatcham, Reading

== Nearby villages ==
Yattendon, Frilsham
