= Craigtoun Country Park =

Country park in the county of Fife, Scotland

Coordinates: 56.318°N 2.841°W

Designations

Inventory of Gardens and Designed Landscapes in Scotland
- Official name: Craigtoun
- Designated: 31 March 2005
- Reference no.: GDL00117

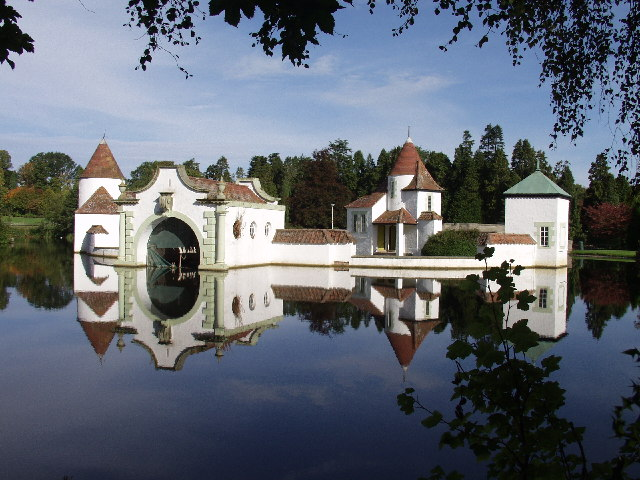
The 'Dutch Village' at Craigtoun Country Park

Craigtoun Country Park is a country park located approximately 2 miles to the south-west of St Andrews in the county of Fife, Scotland. The site is currently owned by Fife Council, with park amenities being operated as of 2012 by the charitable organisation Friends of Craigtoun Park. The park was originally part of the Mount Melville Estate, 47 acres (19 ha) of which was purchased by Fife County Council for £25,000 in 1947.

== History ==
The Mount Melville Estate, originally called Craigtoun, was one of the many Melville family estates, first acquired in 1698 for General George Melville of Strathkiness. In the late 18th century General Robert Melville oversaw extensive landscaping of the grounds including the planting of orchards and woodland. James Gillespie Graham was responsible for the reconstruction of the house between 1820 and 1821. The house and grounds continued in Melville family ownership until 1901 when the new owner Dr James Younger of the Younger brewing dynasty commissioned Paul W. Waterhouse to design a new mansion house and landscape the park.

James Younger (1856–1946) owner of the Mount Melville estate from 1901 to 1946

Waterhouse created or modified the majority of the features which remain in the park today, including the walled garden, Cypress avenue, rose garden, Italian garden and temple (demolished by Fife County Council in 1966). In 1920 Waterhouse added a series of lakes and the picturesque island village, now known as the 'Dutch Village'. A summerhouse was also inserted into eastern boundary of the walled garden.

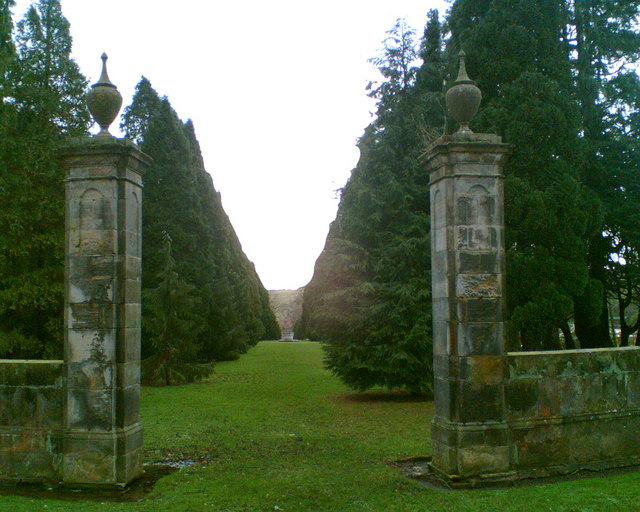
Cypress Avenue, designed by Paul Waterhouse

In 1947 Mount Melville house and gardens were acquired by Fife County Council with the mansion becoming a maternity hospital and the gardens established as Craigtoun Country Park. Attractions added since 1947 include a bowling green, stage, miniature railway, and putting green. In 2012 the Friends of Craigtoun group was formed to work in partnership with Fife Council to run the amenities in the park. The summer of 2013 saw the park reopen with amenities operated by the Friends of Craigtoun and the park grounds and gardens maintained by Fife Council.

== Facilities ==
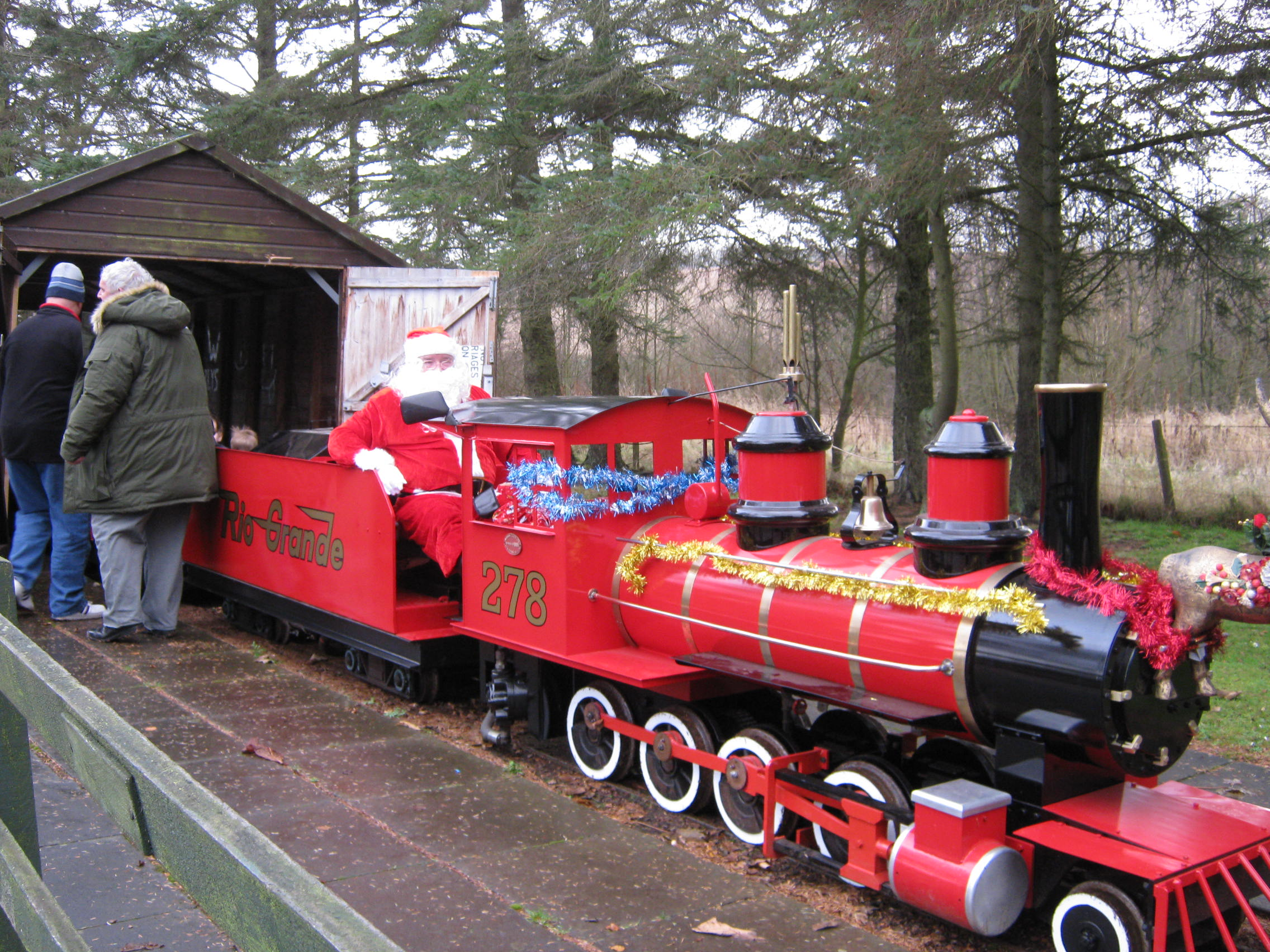
Craigtoun park train

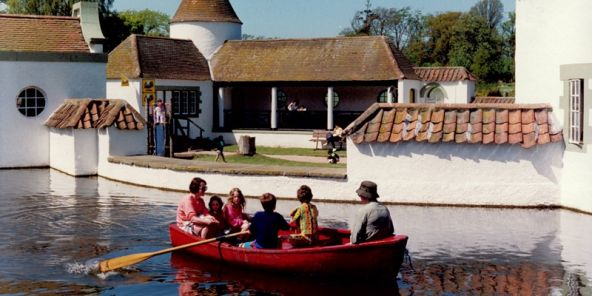
the boats at Craigtoun Park

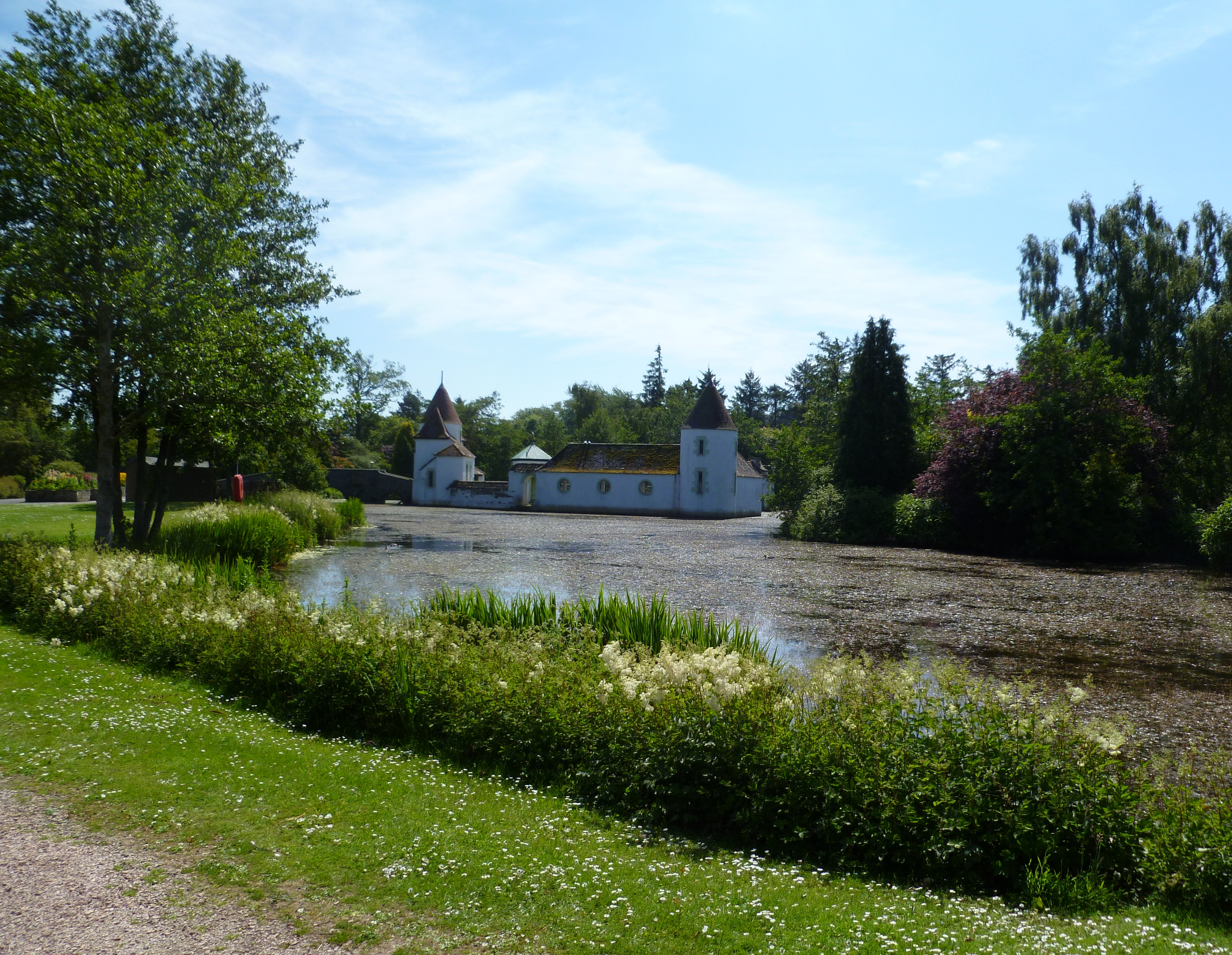
Summer at the boating pond

The principal amenities currently in operation at the park are the 'Puffin' Billy' vintage tractor, the Craigtoun Miniature Railway, bouncy castle, putting as well as rowing boats and pedalos sited on the Dutch Village lake. The park also has a free nature trail available from the ticket office and four caches for geocaching. Further features include a 'fairy glen', Italian garden, greenhouses and formal gardens. Every Saturday morning at 9:30 there is a free public 'parkrun' consisting of a 5 km (3 mi) course around the park.

== Flora and fauna ==
The park comprises woodland, water and marshland habitats in addition to maintained areas of grassland, tree plantations and formal gardens. Notably there survive within the park examples of Portuguese laurel, yew, Wellingtonia planted during the landscaping works executed by Waterhouse. Craigtoun is also home to a variety of wildlife including a healthy population of mute swans, mallards, grey herons, red squirrels and European water voles.
