= Amersham Hall =

Coordinates: 51.6666°N 0.6186°W

Information
- Established: 1829
- Closed: 1896
- Gender: Boys

Amersham Hall was a "school for the sons of dignified gentlemen" in England. From 1829 to 1861 it was in Elmodesham House in Amersham, Buckinghamshire, relocating in 1861 to Caversham in Oxfordshire. The Caversham site, a suburb in the north of Reading and now in Berkshire, currently houses Queen Anne's School.

Charles West, the son of the founder, and one of the pupils for whom the school was founded, went on to be one of the first paediatricians in the United Kingdom, and to found Gt Ormond St Hospital for Sick Children.

The Reverend Ebenezer West, principal of Amersham Hall, funded most of the construction of the West Memorial Hall in Caversham, as well as the Caversham Baptist Free Church a decade later. The memorial hall was extended in 1911 to provide rooms for "wholesome recreation and moral improvement for the young men of Caversham", increasing the space available for religious educations on Sundays (in connection with the Caversham Free Church).

The school closed in 1896 following an outbreak of scarlet fever.

== Notable alumni ==
- Augustine Birrell (1850–1933), author and politician
- Virgoe Buckland (1825–1883), surveyor (son of William Thomas Buckland)
- Francis Gotch (1853–1913), neurophysiologist
- Sir Alfred Pearce Gould (1852–1922), Dean of the Faculty of Medicine of the University of London (1912–16), Vice-Chancellor of the university (1916–17)
- John Neville Keynes (1852–1949), economist
- Sir Frank William Wills Kt. (1852–1932), architect, surveyor and Lord Mayor of Bristol. He was also a member of the Wills tobacco family
- Sir Frederick Wills Bt. (1838–1909) businessman, Liberal Unionist politician, and a director of WD & HO Wills, which later merged to become Imperial Tobacco
- Robert Maynard Leonard (1869–1941), journalist and editor

== Sources ==
- On Line Tour of Old Amersham - amersham.org
- Image of Amersham Hall School, Henley Road, Caversham
