= West Memorial Hall =

Church in Caversham, Berkshire, England

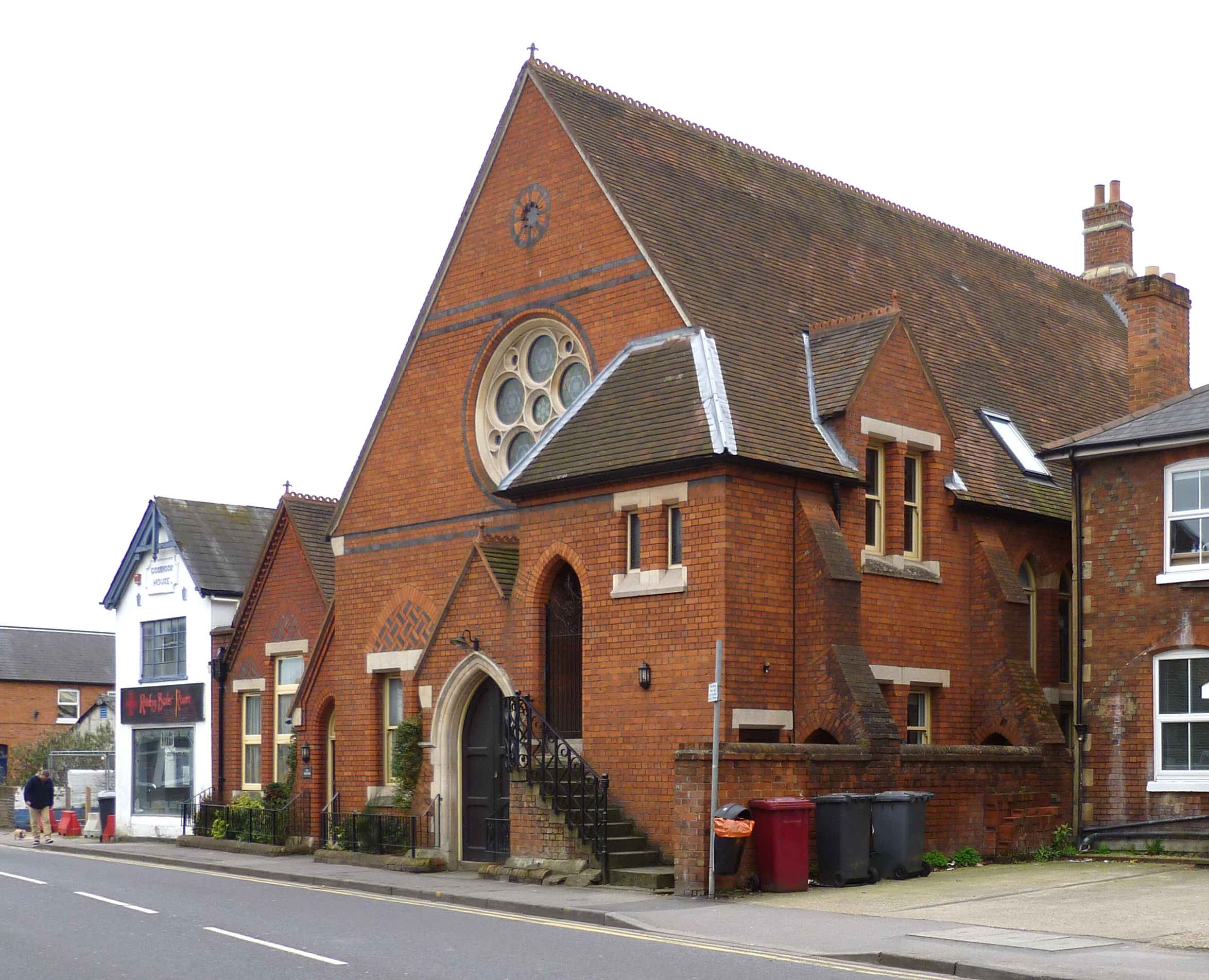
- View from the north

- Location within Reading, Berkshire

General information
- Location: Caversham, Berkshire, UK
- Coordinates: 51.46716°N 0.97158°W
- Completed: 1865-66

Design and construction
- Architect: Alfred Waterhouse

The West Memorial Hall, or West Memorial Institute, is a Victorian Grade II listed building at 7-9 Gosbrook Road, Caversham, Berkshire, designed by Alfred Waterhouse. The Hall is a former Baptist Free Church that has now been converted to apartments.

== Architecture ==
The Hall was designed by the noted Victorian architect Alfred Waterhouse in 1865-66 in the Gothic style. It is positioned gable end to the street and built in red brick with blue brick decorative features including bands above and below a large rose window and an alternating red and blue pattern above the ground floor windows. It also has a distinctive hipped rectangular stair turret to the gallery with external stairs. Flying buttresses may be seen on the outside walls.

In 1911 the Hall was extended on the east side in a similar style to the existing building with a central gable facing the road and a small ornamental cross on the apex of the roof as on the original.

=== Gallery ===
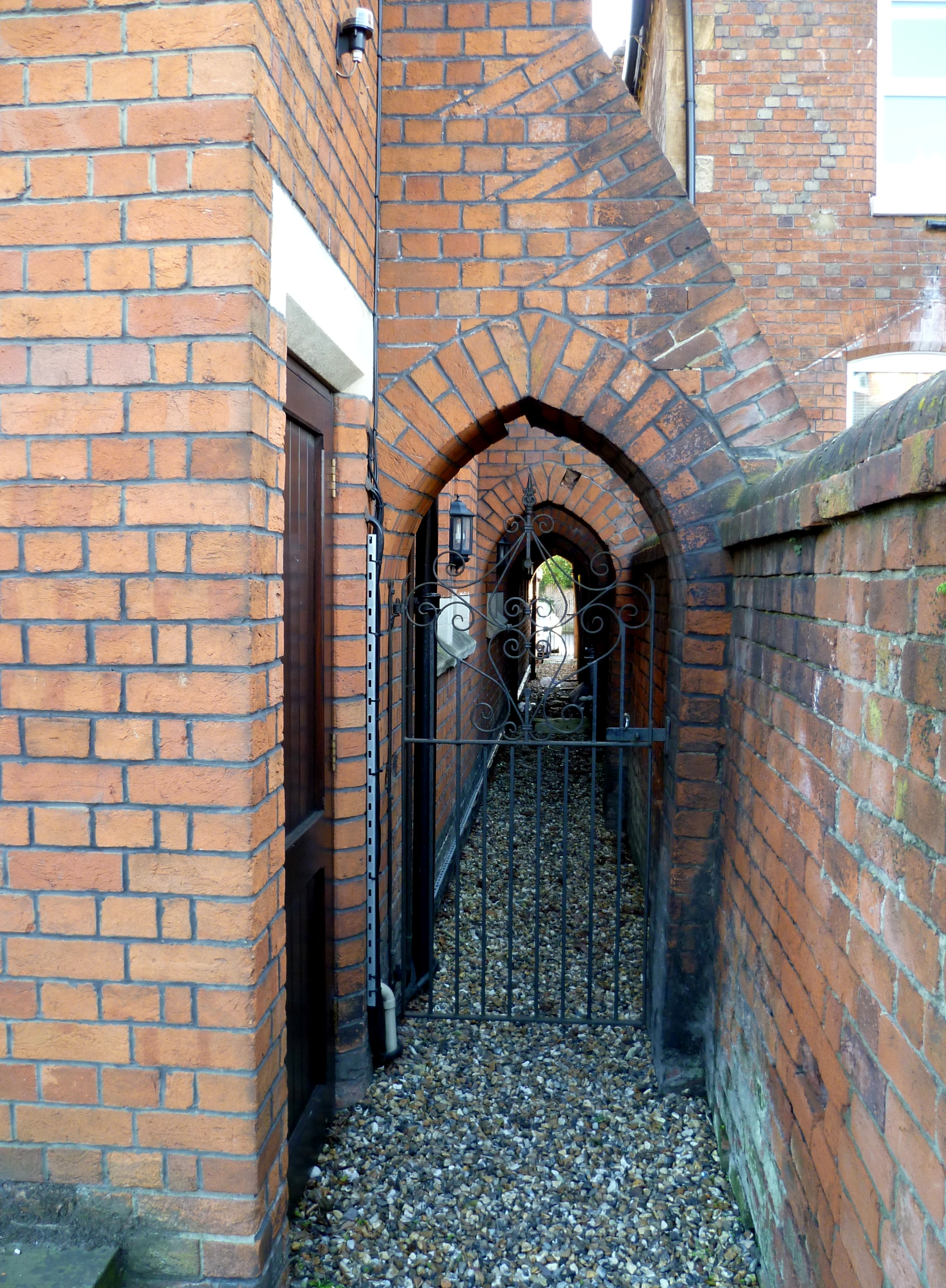
Flying buttresses on the west side of the Hall.

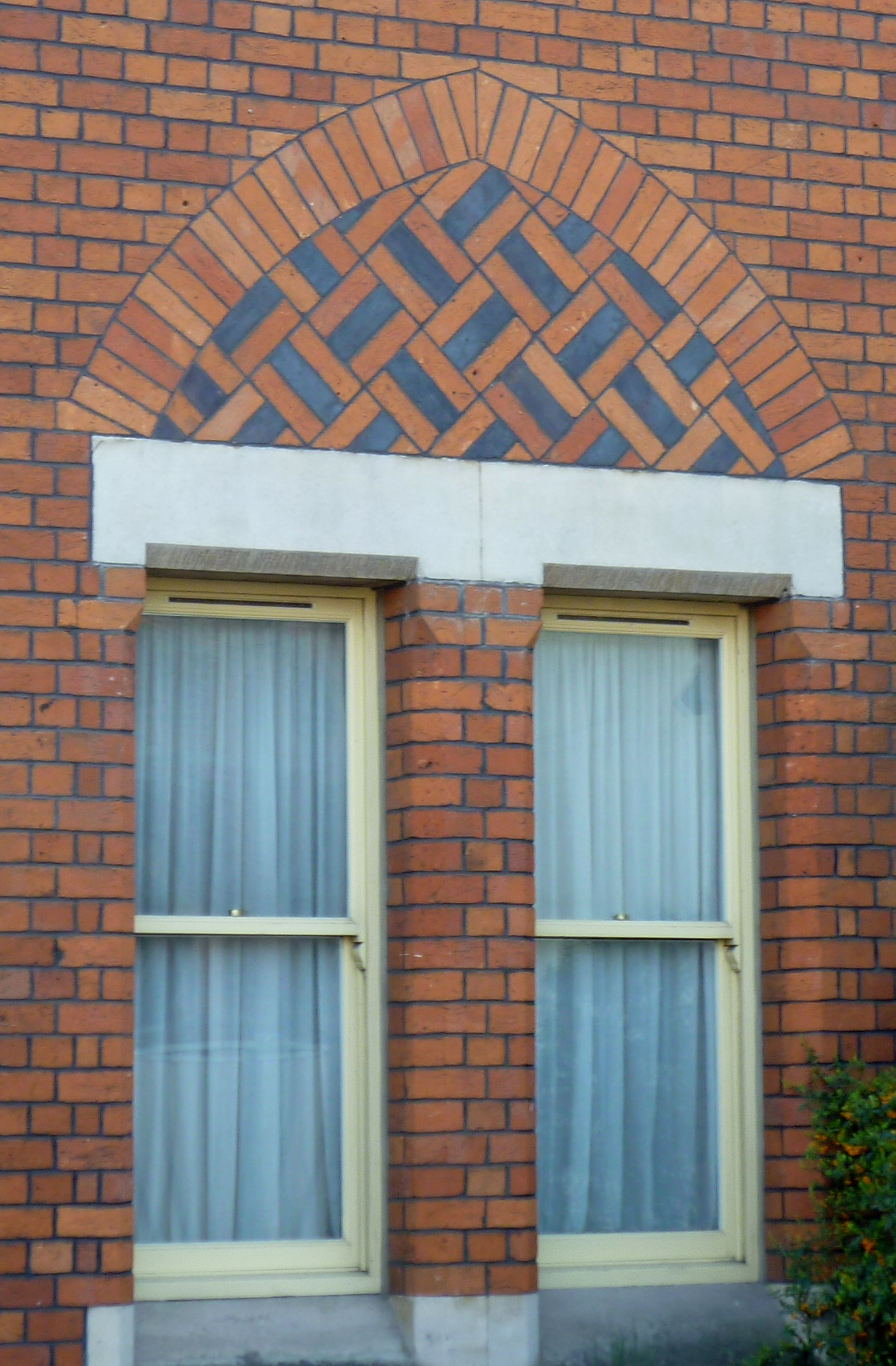
A brickwork pattern above the ground floor windows created using alternating red and blue bricks.

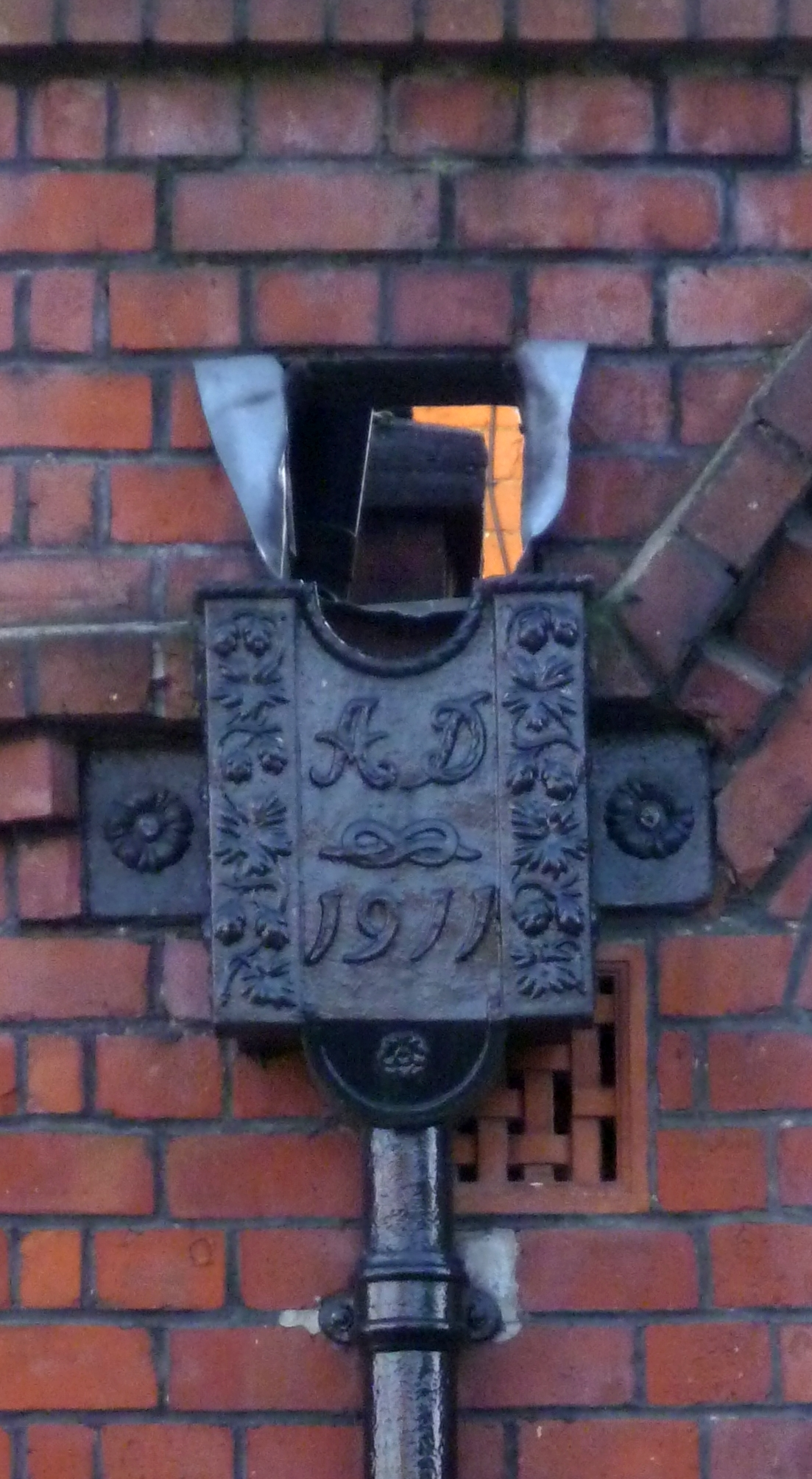
An ironwork detail from the 1911 extension to the Hall.

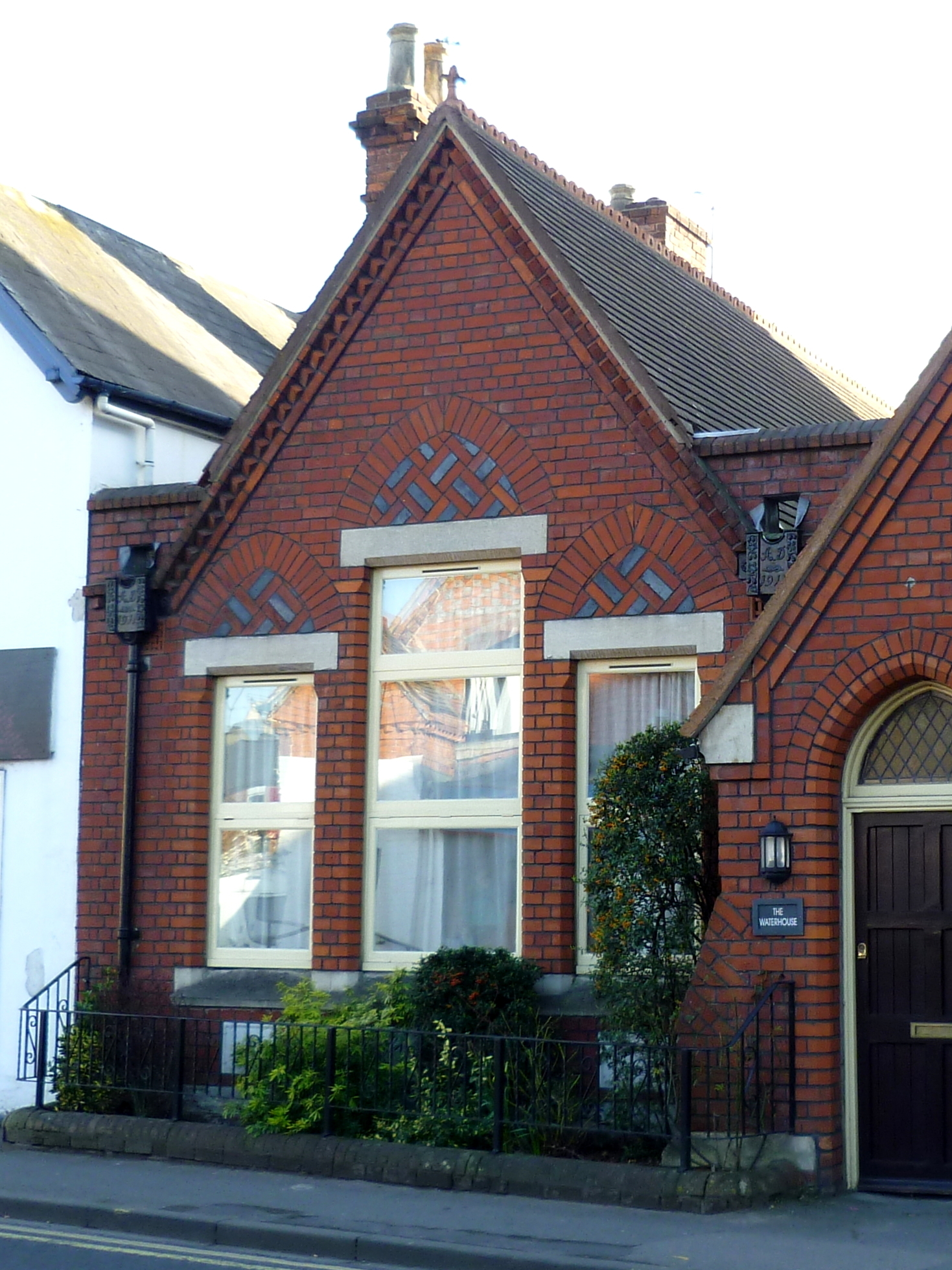
The 1911 extension is in the same style as the original building.

== History ==
The Hall was the original Baptist church in Caversham, and its construction was mostly funded by the Reverend Ebenezer West, principal of Amersham Hall. West also funded most of the cost of building the new Caversham Baptist Free Church a decade later, also by Waterhouse, which stands on the opposite side of the road. After the new church opened, the Memorial Hall was used as a school. In 1911 it was extended "...to find rooms for wholesome recreation and moral improvement for the young men of Caversham, and to increase the space available for religious teaching on Sundays in connection with the Caversham Free Church, of which the late Mr Ebenezer West was so generous a supporter."

The Hall was Grade II listed by English Heritage on 14 December 1978, meaning that it is regarded as "nationally important and of special interest". From 1980 it was the Caversham Dance Centre.

Around 2000, the Hall was converted into apartments and it is now known as The Waterhouse. In 2010 a planning application to build apartments on an adjacent site was refused by Reading Borough Council, partly on the grounds that the application was not in keeping with the Grade II listed status of the Hall.

== See also ==
- List of ecclesiastical works by Alfred Waterhouse
