= Refuge Assurance Company =

English insurance company

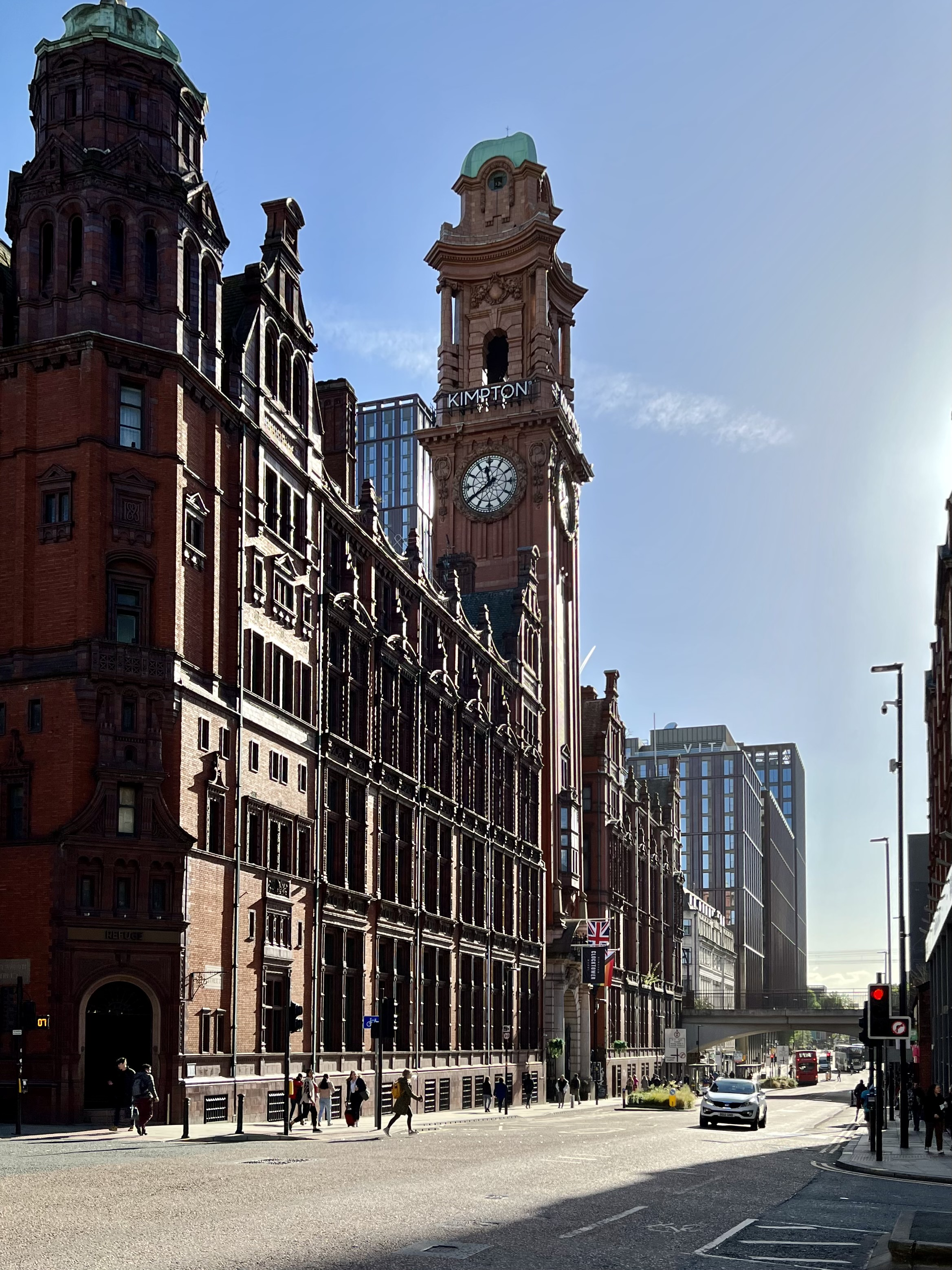
- The Refuge Assurance Building, Manchester - the company's head office between 1895 and 1987
- Industry: Insurance
- Founded: 1858; 168 years ago
- Defunct: 1996
- Fate: Merged with United Friendly
- Successor: Royal London Mutual Insurance Society
- Headquarters: Dukinfield, Cheshire, England

The Refuge Assurance Company Ltd. was a life insurance and pensions company based in England.

== History ==
The business was founded by James Proctor and George Robins in Dukinfield, Cheshire as the Refuge Friend in Deed Life Assurance and Sick Fund Friendly Society in 1858.

From 1895 until 1987, its head office was the magnificent Grade II* listed, Refuge Assurance Building on Oxford Street in central Manchester, now used as the Kimpton Clocktower Hotel. In 1987, the company decided to move out of the city centre to new, purpose-built, offices on the grounds of Fulshaw Hall in Wilmslow, around 12 miles south of the old Refuge Building. In October 1996, the Refuge Assurance Company merged with United Friendly to form the United Assurance Group (UAG).

After disappointing performances following the merger, the United Assurance Group was first approached by Britannic Assurance in November 1999, and then by Royal London Mutual Insurance Society in February 2000. Following successful talks, Royal London took over UAG for £1.6 billion. The Royal London Group is the UK’s largest mutual life, pensions, and investment company, that offers protection, long-term savings, and asset management products and services.
