= Kimpton Clocktower Hotel =

Historic commercial building in Manchester, England

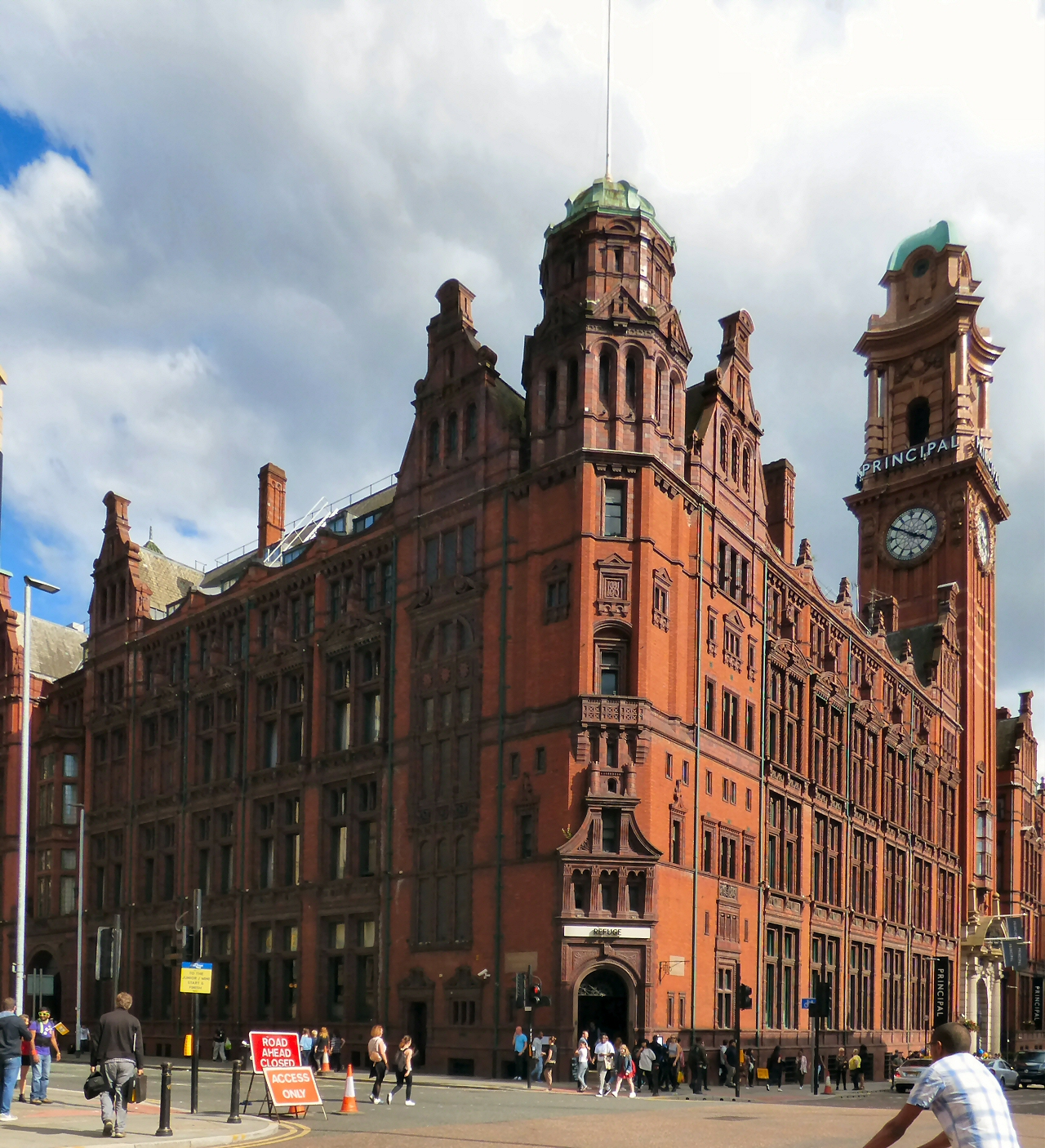
- Oxford Street façade with clock tower in 2017
- Former names: The Principal Manchester, Le Méridien Palace Manchester, Palace Hotel
- Alternative names: Refuge Assurance Building

General information
- Type: Originally offices for Refuge Assurance; hotel since 1989
- Architectural style: Eclectic Baroque
- Location: Oxford Street, Manchester, M60 7HA, UK
- Coordinates: 53.474°N 2.240°W
- Current tenants: Kimpton
- Construction started: 1891
- Opened: 1895 (131 years ago)
- Renovated: 1912, 1932, 2016, 2020
- Client: Refuge Assurance Company
- Owner: InterContinental Hotels Group

Height
- Height: 66 m (217 ft)

Design and construction
- Architects: Alfred Waterhouse, Paul Waterhouse, Stanley Birkett
- Designations

Listed Building – Grade II*
- Official name: Former Refuge Assurance Company Offices
- Designated: 3 October 1974
- Reference no.: 1271429

Website
- Official website

The Kimpton Clocktower Hotel is a historic commercial building, now a hotel, at the corner of Oxford Street and Whitworth Street in Manchester, England. The Grade II* listed building was originally constructed in segments from 1891 to 1932 as the Refuge Assurance Building.

== History ==
=== Refuge Assurance Company ===
The first phase of the red brick and terracotta building was designed for the Refuge Assurance Company by Alfred Waterhouse and built between 1891 and 1895. The inside was of Burmantofts faience and glazed brick. The ground floor was a large, open business hall. It was extended, with a 217-foot (66 m) tower, along Oxford Street by his son Paul Waterhouse between 1910 and 1912. It was further extended along Whitworth Street by Stanley Birkett in 1932.

What is now the ballroom was previously the dining hall for employees, with males and females being required to sit separately. Around 2,000 staff were employed. Women had to reapply for jobs if they married, and some areas of the building were for men only. The ballroom in the basement was used as a dance hall for workers in their lunch hour.

After occupying the building as offices for nearly a century, the Refuge Assurance Company moved to the grounds of Fulshaw Hall, Cheshire, on 6 November 1987. The Refuge Assurance Company had discussed converting the building into a new home for the Hallé Orchestra with one of Manchester's cultural patrons Sir Bob Scott for over a year. The £3 million funding required for the project did not materialise and the Hallé subsequently moved from the Free Trade Hall to the new Bridgewater Hall upon opening in 1996. Local architecture critic John Parkinson-Bailey noted that "one of the most prestigious and expensive buildings in Manchester lay forlorn and empty except for a caretaker and the ghost on its staircase".

=== Conversion to hotel ===
The structure was converted to a hotel by Richard Newman in 1996 at a cost of £7 million, and was named the Palace Hotel, owned and operated by the Principal Hotel Company. Principal Hotels was sold to Nomura International Plc in 2001, and they rebranded the hotel as Le Méridien Palace Manchester. When Le Méridien Hotels faced financial difficulties, the hotel was bought back by a reconstituted Principal Hotels in 2004 and again renamed the Palace Hotel. When Principal Hotels decided to brand all their hotels with their corporate name, the hotel was renamed The Principal Manchester, in November 2016. The current glass dome in the reception area was taken from a Scottish railway station during the conversion to a hotel.

In May 2018, the hotel was sold to the InterContinental Hotels Group. It was announced in February 2020 that the hotel would be renamed the Kimpton Clocktower Hotel in March, as part of InterContinental Hotels Group's Kimpton Hotels brand; however, the hotel was forced to close before the renaming due to the COVID-19 pandemic. It reopened under the Kimpton name on 1 October 2020.

The hotel is purported to be haunted. One of the staircases is said to be haunted by a grieving war widow who committed suicide by throwing herself down it from the top floor. The staircase in question was only accessible to men at the time. Room 261 is allegedly haunted, with reports of the sound of children playing at night.

== See also ==
- Grade II* listed buildings in Greater Manchester
- Listed buildings in Manchester-M1
