= Blacknest =

Village in Hampshire, England

Coordinates: 51.167284°N 0.85981°W

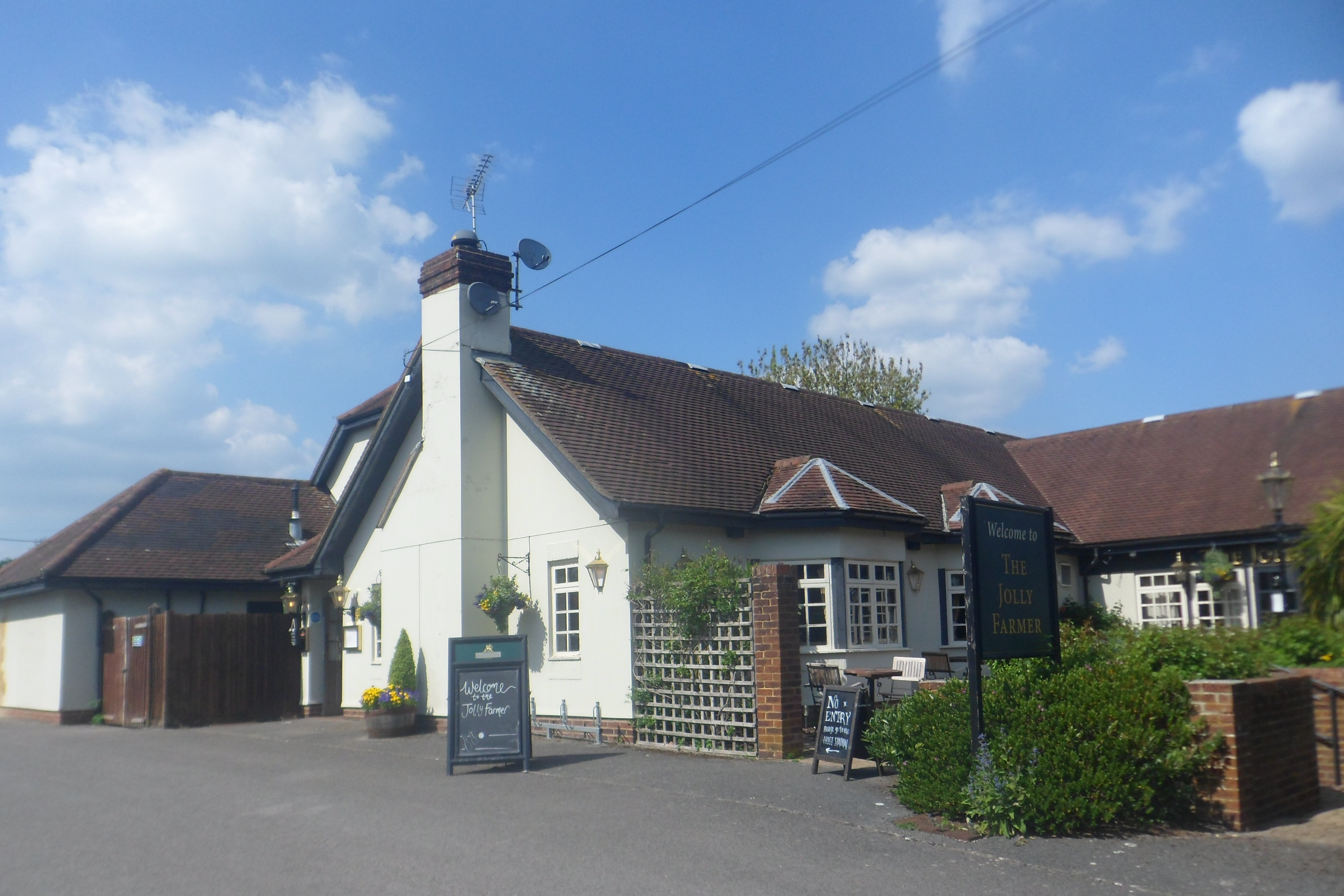
- Jolly Farmer Pub in Blacknest, Hampshire, England

- Location within Hampshire
- OS grid reference: SU7981641511
- District: East Hampshire
- Shire county: Hampshire
- Region: South East
- Country: England
- Sovereign state: United Kingdom
- Post town: ALTON
- Postcode district: GU34
- Dialling code: 01420
- Police: Hampshire and Isle of Wight
- Fire: Hampshire and Isle of Wight
- Ambulance: South Central

Blacknest is a village in Hampshire, England. It is in the civil parish of Binsted.

The village has a golf course (the Blacknest Golf & Country Club), one pub (named the Jolly Farmer) and access to the Alice Holt Forest. Its nearest town is Alton, which lies approximately 5 mi (8 km) west from the village.
