= Paul Waterhouse =

British architect

- Born: 29 October 1861; Manchester, England
- Died: 19 December 1924 (aged 63); Yattendon, England
- Education: Balliol College, Oxford
- Occupation: Architect
- Spouse: Lucy Palgrave
- Children: Michael Waterhouse
- Parent: Alfred Waterhouse

Paul Waterhouse (29 October 1861 – 19 December 1924) was a British architect.

== Early life ==
Paul Waterhouse was born on 29 October 1861 in Manchester, England. He was the son and business partner of Alfred Waterhouse, an architect who designed many well-known buildings in England and had been President of the Royal Institute of British Architects (RIBA).

Waterhouse was educated at Balliol College, Oxford, obtaining his MA in 1887.

== Career ==
Waterhouse joined his father's practice and became a partner in 1891, taking over the practice in 1905 and continuing his father's commitment to working on large business and public buildings. His own simpler and more classical style was demonstrated in his work for St Andrews University in Scotland (the University Union, St Regulus Club and the Younger Hall) and his work at Mount Melville, St Andrews, Fife and the National Provincial Banks at Paris, Brussels and Antwerp. He had a penchant for marking his buildings with chronogramic inscriptions. He was elected President of RIBA for 1921–1923.

== Personal life and death ==
Waterhouse married Lucy Palgrave on 16 July 1887. They had two daughters, and their son, Michael Waterhouse (b. 1888) also became an architect and President of RIBA. Waterhouse died on 19 December 1924.

== Works ==
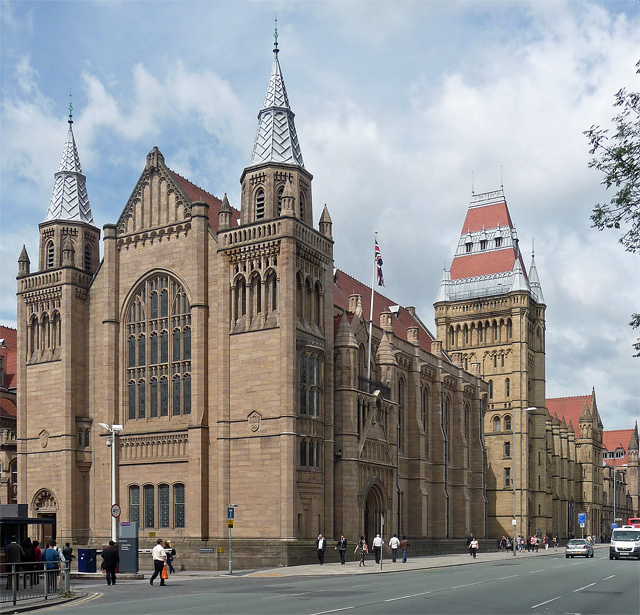
Whitworth Hall, Manchester

- 114–116 Colmore Row, Birmingham – the former Atlas Assurance building, Grade II listed
- Girton College, University of Cambridge (1887)
- Refuge Assurance Building, Manchester (now the Meridien Palace Hotel), (extension of his father's original work) (1893), Grade II* listed
- completion of Christie Library of the University of Manchester between 1895 and 1898
- Whitworth Hall of the University of Manchester, completed in 1902, Grade II* listed
- extension of Manchester Museum from 1911 to 1927 (the later part completed by his son, Michael Waterhouse)
- Dyson Perrins Laboratory, Oxford (1913–1916)
- Royal Institution of Chartered Surveyors, London (1896)
- University College Hospital, London (1897)
- Mount Melville House, St Andrews, Fife (1902–1905)

== Other sources ==
- Girton College architecture
- Foster, Andy (2005) Birmingham. (Pevsner Architectural Guides) New Haven: Yale U. P. ISBN 0-300-10731-5
