= Yattendon =

Coordinates: 51°28′01″N 1°12′11″W

- Village and civil parish
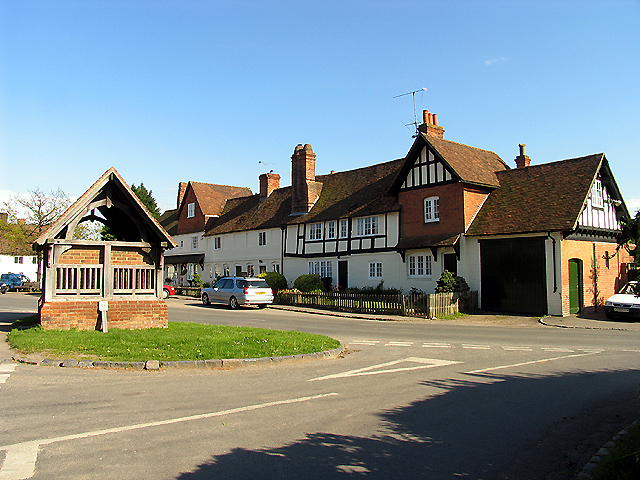
- Yattendon village

- Location within Berkshire
- Area: 0.63 km^{2} (0.24 sq mi)
- Population: 369 (2011 census)
  - Density: 586/km^{2} (1,520/sq mi)
- OS grid reference: SU5574
- Unitary authority: West Berkshire
- Ceremonial county: Berkshire
- Region: South East
- Country: England
- Sovereign state: United Kingdom
- Post town: Thatcham
- Postcode district: RG18
- Dialling code: 01635
- Police: Thames Valley
- Fire: Royal Berkshire
- Ambulance: South Central
- UK Parliament: Newbury

Yattendon is an estate village and civil parish 7 miles (11 km) northeast of Newbury in the county of Berkshire, England. The M4 motorway passes through the fields of the village which lie 0.5 miles (800 m) south and below the elevations of its cluster. The village is privately owned and is "part of the 9,000 acre estate owned by the Iliffes, former press barons", part of the Yattendon Group.

== Geography ==
Yattendon stretches from Everington in the west to the hamlet of Burnt Hill in the east and the woodland just east of Yattendon Court, including Mumgrove Copse, Bushy Copse, Clack's Copse and Gravelpit Copse. The M4 motorway forms most of its southern boundary and some of the houses on the northern edge of Frilsham are actually in Yattendon. The River Pang flows through the west of the parish. It was in the hundred of Faircross, which was of little consequence after the Dissolution of the Monasteries and effectively ceased to function after 1886.

== History ==
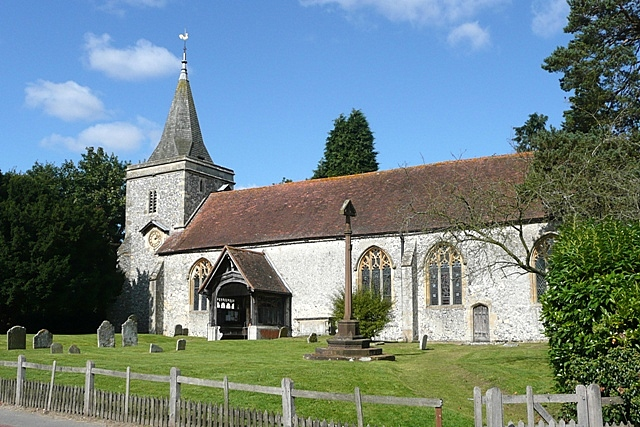
The church of St Peter and St Paul

The Church of St. Peter and St. Paul was built around 1450 and was "restored in 1858, 1881 and a spire was added by Alfred Waterhouse in 1896". The village has had a shop since the 1600s. According to the Estate, the Iliffe's took over the operation in 2014 and "Edward Iliffe, son of Lord Iliffe, was appointed Postmaster". William Burham, a saddle and harness maker had a shop in the village from 1901 until his death in the early 1960s. A collection of his leather working tools is in the Museum of English Rural Life.

== Amenities ==
Yattendon has a shop, post office, garage, pub/hotel, hairdressers, blacksmith, primary school, Montessori school, tennis courts and brewery as well as houses and cottages rented to tenants. Yattendon has 31 Grade II Listed buildings, as well as the Church of St. Peter and St. Paul which is Grade I.

== Notable people ==
Notable residents of Yattendon include:

- Henry Charles Beeching (1859 – 1919); clergyman, writer and poet; Rector of Yattendon 1885-1900
- Robert Bridges, who later became Poet Laureate, lived at Yattendon until 1882, where he compiled the Yattendon Hymnal.
- Thomas Carte, noted English historian, once held the rectory and was buried in the church.
- General Sir Miles Dempsey, British Army officer who fought in World War I and World War II.
- Edward Iliffe, 1st Baron Iliffe, the newspaper magnate who lived at Yattendon Court. From 1925 to 1940, he amalgamated several small farming estates and formed the Yattendon Estate in 1955.
- Ruth Mott, cook and TV presenter, was born in the village. She was a technical advisor on the 2001 Robert Altman film Gosford Park.
- Egon Ronay the restaurant critic, lived in Yattendon until his death in 2010.
- Alfred Waterhouse, the architect of the Natural History Museum who built himself a home at Yattendon Court (not the present building).

The fortified manor house, Yattendon Castle was home of:

- Sir Henry Norreys, a Tudor courtier accused of adultery with Queen Anne Boleyn and the father of
- Henry Norris, 1st Baron Norreys, Ambassador to France and father of
- Sir John Norreys, the greatest soldier of Elizabethan England whose memorial is in the parish church.
