= William Burges =

English Gothic revival architect and designer (1827–1881)

William Burges ARA
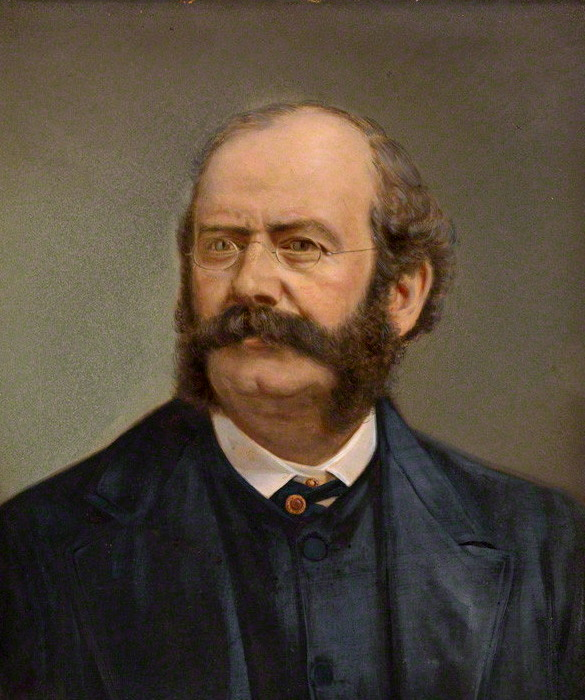
- Burges in 1881
- Born: 2 December 1827
- Died: 20 April 1881 (aged 53); The Tower House, Kensington, London, England
- Education: King's College London
- Occupation: Architect
- Parent: Alfred Burges
- Buildings: Saint Fin Barre's Cathedral; Cardiff Castle; Castell Coch; The Tower House

William Burges ARA (/ˈbɜːrdʒɛs/; 2 December 1827 – 20 April 1881) was an English architect and designer. Among the greatest of the Victorian art-architects, he sought in his work to escape from both nineteenth-century industrialisation and the Neoclassical architectural style and re-establish the architectural and social values of a utopian medieval England. Burges stands within the tradition of the Gothic Revival, his works echoing those of the Pre-Raphaelites and heralding those of the Arts and Crafts movement.

Burges won his first major commission for Saint Fin Barre's Cathedral in Cork in 1863 when he was 35. He died in 1881 at his Kensington home, The Tower House aged only 53. His architectural output was small but varied. Working with a long-standing team of craftsmen, he built churches, a cathedral, a warehouse, a university, a school, houses and castles. Burges's most notable works are Cardiff Castle, constructed between 1866 and 1928, and Castell Coch (1872–1891), both of which were built for John Crichton-Stuart, 3rd Marquess of Bute. Other significant buildings include Gayhurst House, Buckinghamshire (1858–1865), Knightshayes Court (1867–1874), the Church of Christ the Consoler (1870–1876), St Mary's, Studley Royal (1870–1878), in Yorkshire, and Park House, Cardiff (1871–1880).

Many of his designs were never executed or were subsequently demolished or altered. His competition entries for cathedrals at Lille (1854), Adelaide (1856), Colombo, Brisbane (1859), Edinburgh (1873), and Truro (1878) were all unsuccessful. He lost out to George Edmund Street in the competition for the Royal Courts of Justice (1866–67) in The Strand. His plans for the redecoration of the interior of St Paul's Cathedral (1870–1877) were abandoned and he was dismissed from his post. Skilbeck's Warehouse (1865–66) was demolished in the 1970s, and work at Salisbury Cathedral (1855–1859), Worcester College, Oxford (1873–1879), and at Knightshayes Court had been lost in the decades before.

Beyond architecture, Burges designed metalwork, sculpture, jewellery, furniture and stained glass. Art Applied to Industry, a series of lectures he gave to the Society of Arts in 1864, illustrates the breadth of his interests; the topics covered including glass, pottery, brass and iron, gold and silver, furniture, the weaver's art and external architectural decoration. For most of the century following his death, Victorian architecture was neither the subject of intensive study nor sympathetic attention and Burges's work was largely ignored. The revival of interest in Victorian art, architecture, and design in the later twentieth century led to a renewed appreciation of Burges and his work.

== Early life and travels ==
Burges was born on 2 December 1827, the son of Alfred Burges (1796–1886), a wealthy civil engineer. Alfred amassed a considerable fortune, which enabled his son to devote his life to the study and practice of architecture without requiring that he actually earn a living.

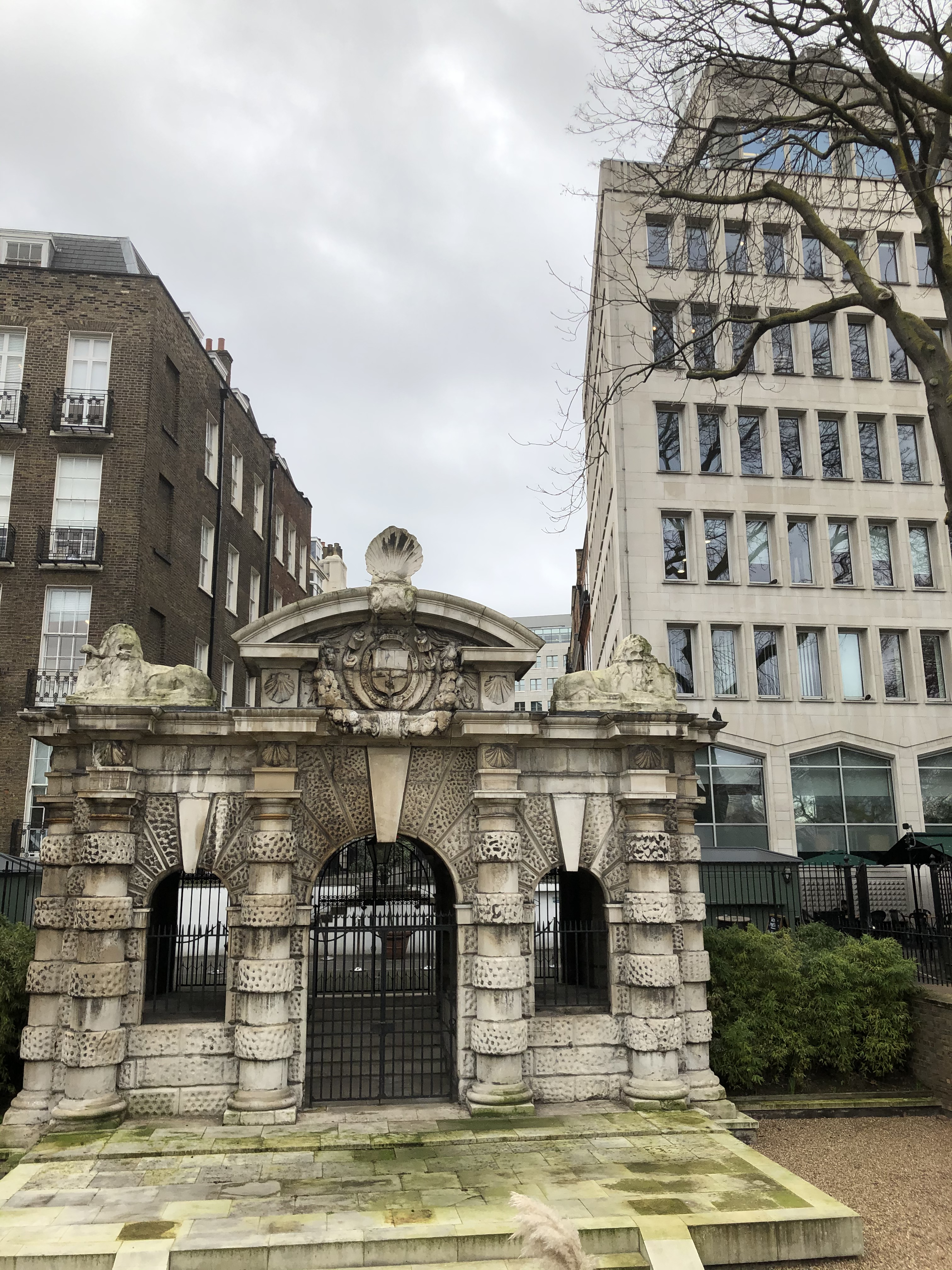
Burdett House, 15–16 Buckingham Street to the right of the York Water Gate. Burges had his home/studio in a building on the site of No.15. (Note: Burdett House was constructed in 1968, replacing a building of 1906 which was destroyed in World War II. That building replaced two earlier Georgian buildings, 15 & 16, Buckingham Street. No. 15 was home to Burges, 1856–1875, Charles Dickens, circa 1834, and William Smith, 1804–1819. It has also, erroneously, been described as home to Peter the Great during the London stage of his Grand Embassy in 1698. The block stands to the right of the York Water Gate.)

Burges entered King's College School, London, in 1839 to study engineering, his contemporaries there including Dante Gabriel Rossetti and William Michael Rossetti. He left in 1844 to join the office of Edward Blore, surveyor to Westminster Abbey. Blore was an established architect, having worked for both William IV and Queen Victoria, and had made his reputation as a proponent of the Gothic Revival. In 1848 or 1849, Burges moved to the offices of Matthew Digby Wyatt. Wyatt was as prominent an architect as Blore, evidenced by his leading role in the direction of The Great Exhibition in 1851. Burges's work with Wyatt, particularly on the Medieval Court for this exhibition, was influential on the subsequent course of his career. During this period, he also worked on drawings of medieval metalwork for Wyatt's book, Metalwork, published in 1852, and assisted Henry Clutton with illustrations for his works.

Of equal importance to Burges's subsequent career was his travelling. Burges believed that all architects should travel, remarking that it was "absolutely necessary to see how various art problems have been resolved in different ages by different men." Enabled by his private income, Burges moved through England, then France, Belgium, Holland, Switzerland, Germany, Spain, Italy, Greece and finally into Turkey. In total, he spent some 18 months abroad developing his skills and knowledge by sketching and drawing. What he saw and drew provided a repository of influences and ideas that he used and re-used for the whole of his career.

Although he never went beyond Turkey, the art and architecture of the East, both Near and Far, had a significant impact on him; his fascination with Moorish design found ultimate expression in the Arab Room at Cardiff Castle, and his study of Japanese techniques influenced his later metalwork. Burges received his first important commission at the age of 35, but his subsequent career did not see the development that might have been expected. His style had already been formed over the previous twenty years of study, thinking and travelling. J. Mordaunt Crook, the foremost authority on Burges, writes that, "once established, after twenty years' preparation, his 'design language' had merely to be applied, and he applied and reapplied the same vocabulary with increasing subtlety and gusto."

== Early works ==
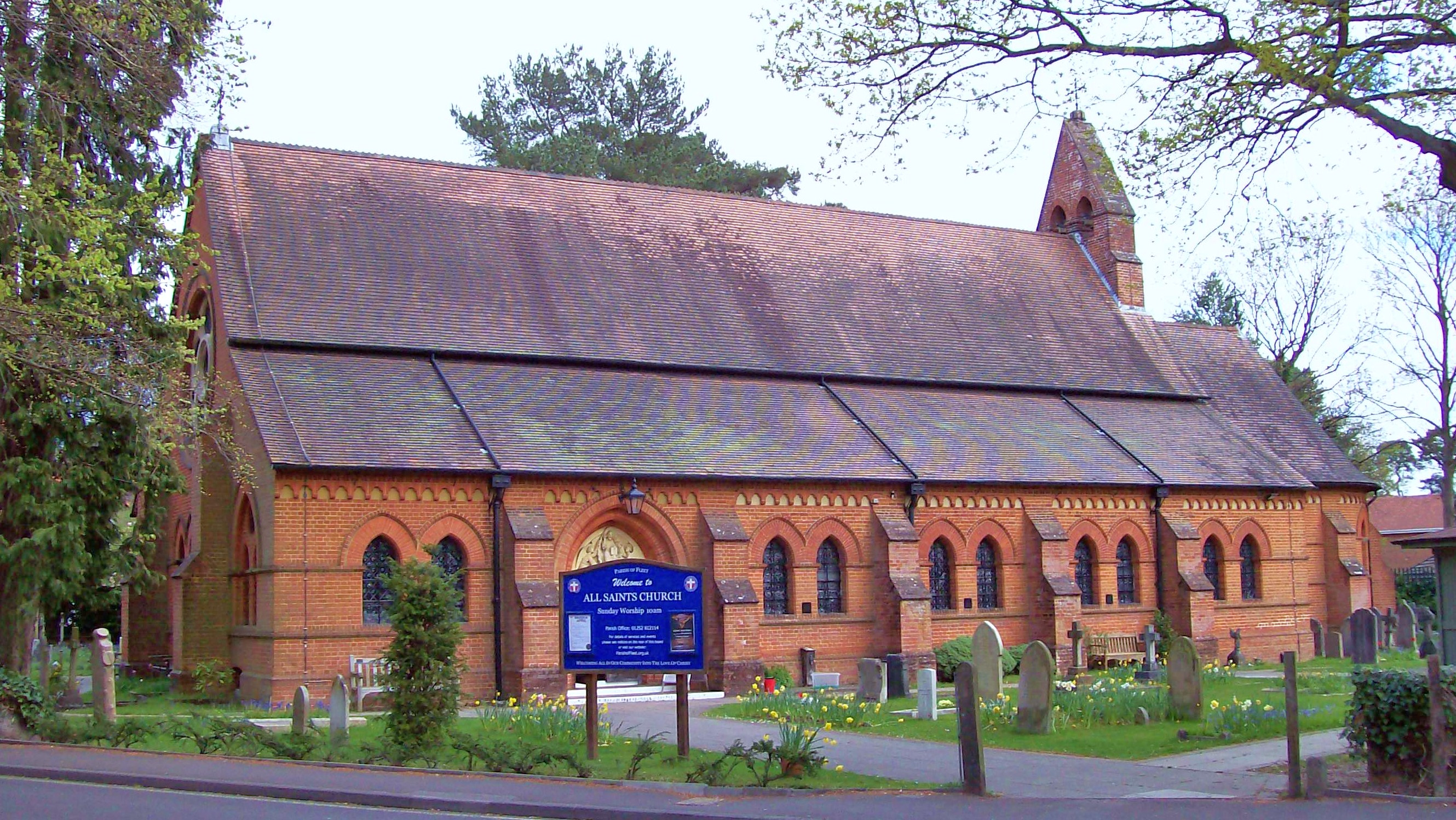
All Saints Church, Fleet, in Hampshire, before an arson attack in 2015

In 1856 Burges established his own architectural practice in London at 15 Buckingham Street, The Strand. Some of his early pieces of furniture were created for this office and were later moved to The Tower House, Melbury Road, Kensington, the home he built for himself towards the end of his life. His early architectural career produced nothing of major note, although he won prestigious commissions, which remained unbuilt, for Lille Cathedral, the Crimea Memorial Church and the Bombay School of Art.

His failed entry for the Law Courts in the Strand, if successful, would have given London its own Carcassonne, the plans being described by the architectural writers Dixon and Muthesius as "a recreation of a thirteenth-century dream world [with] a skyline of great inventiveness." In 1859, he submitted a French-inspired design for St John's Cathedral in Brisbane, Australia, which was rejected. He also provided designs for Colombo Cathedral in Ceylon and St Francis Xavier's Cathedral, Adelaide, without success.

In 1855, however, he obtained a commission for the reconstruction of the chapter house of Salisbury Cathedral. Henry Clutton was the lead architect but Burges, as assistant, contributed to the restoration of the sculpture and to the general decorative scheme. Much was lost in restorations of the 1960s. More lasting was Burges's work of 1858 onwards in the substantial remodelling of Gayhurst House, in Buckinghamshire, for Robert Carrington, 2nd Baron Carrington. Rooms there contain some of his large signature fireplaces, with carving by Burges's long-time collaborator Thomas Nicholls, in particular those in the Drawing Room which include motifs from Paradise Lost and Paradise Regained. He also designed a circular lavatory for the male servants, the Cerberus Privy, which Jeremy Cooper describes as being "surmounted by a growling Cerberus, each of his three heads inset with bloodshot glass eyes."

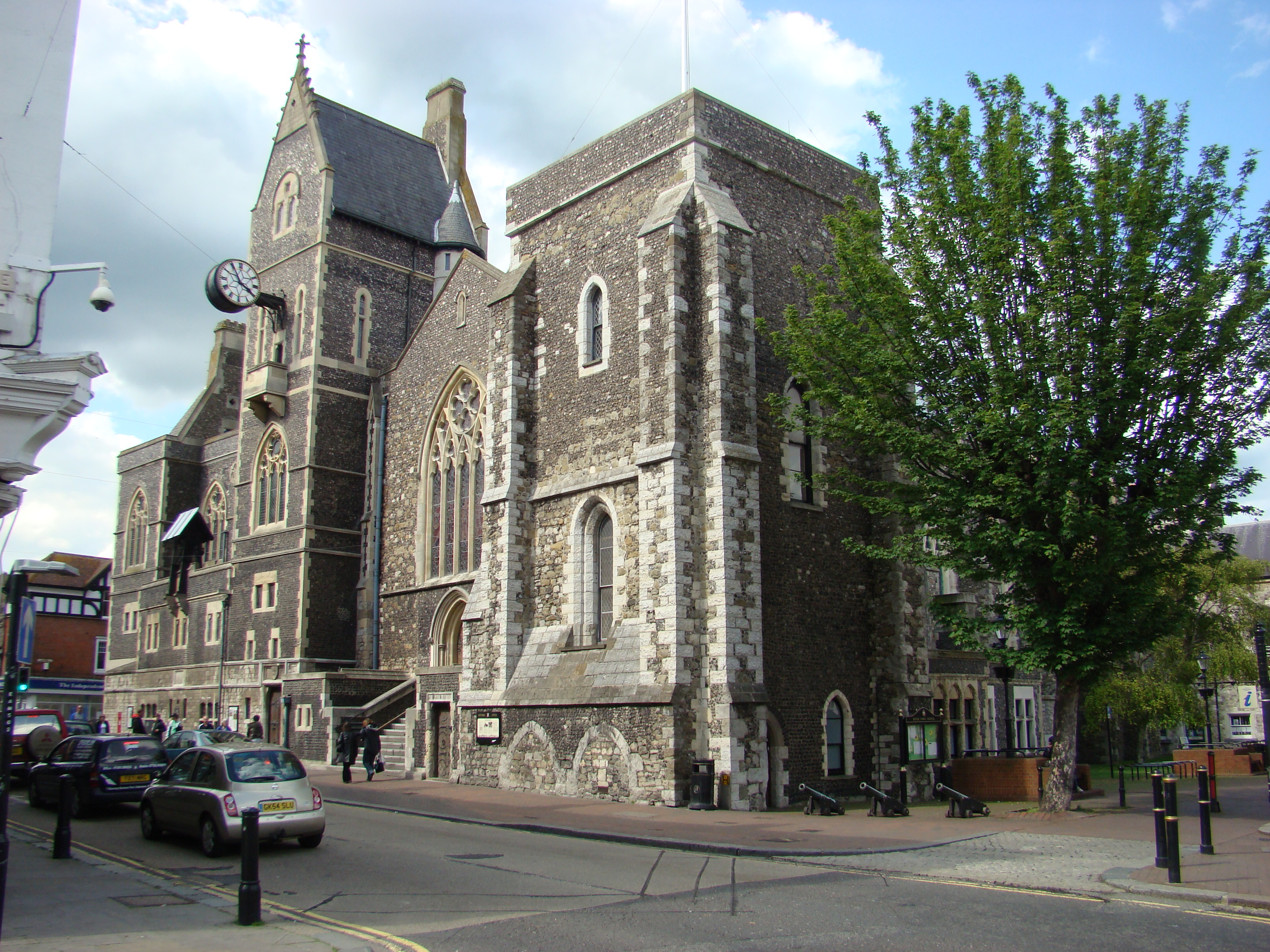
Maison Dieu, Dover

In 1859 Burges began work with Ambrose Poynter on the Maison Dieu, Dover, which was completed in 1861. Emulation of the original medieval style can be seen in his renovation of the grotesque animals and in the coats of arms incorporated into his new designs. Burges later designed the Council Chamber, added in 1867, and in 1881 began work on Connaught Hall in Dover, a town meeting and concert hall. The new building contained meeting rooms and mayoral and official offices. Although Burges designed the project, most of it was completed after his death by his partners, Pullan and Chapple. The listed status of the Maison Dieu was reclassified as Grade I in 2017 and Dover District Council, the building's owner, is seeking grant funding to enable a restoration, focussing on Burges's work.

In 1859–60, Burges took over the restoration of Waltham Abbey from Poynter, working with Poynter's son Edward Poynter and with furniture makers Harland and Fisher. He commissioned Edward Burne-Jones of James Powell & Sons to make three stained-glass windows for the east end, representing the Tree of Jesse. The Abbey is a demonstration of Burges's skills as a restorer, with "a profound sensitivity towards medieval architecture." Mordaunt Crook wrote of Burges's interior that, "it meets the Middle Ages as an equal."

In 1861–62, Burges was commissioned by Charles Edward Lefroy, secretary to the Speaker of the House of Commons, to build All Saints Church, Fleet, as a memorial to Lefroy's wife. She was the daughter of James Walker, who established the marine engineering company of Walker and Burges with Burges's father Alfred, and this family connection brought Burges the commission. Pevsner says of Fleet that "it has no shape, nor character nor notable buildings, except one," that one being All Saints. The church is of red brick and Pevsner considered it "astonishingly restrained." The interior too is simply decorated but the massive sculpture, particularly of the tomb of the Lefroys and of the gabled arch below which the tomb originally stood, is quintessentially Burges, Crook describing it as "not so much muscular (gothic) as muscle-bound."

== Saint Fin Barre's Cathedral, Cork ==
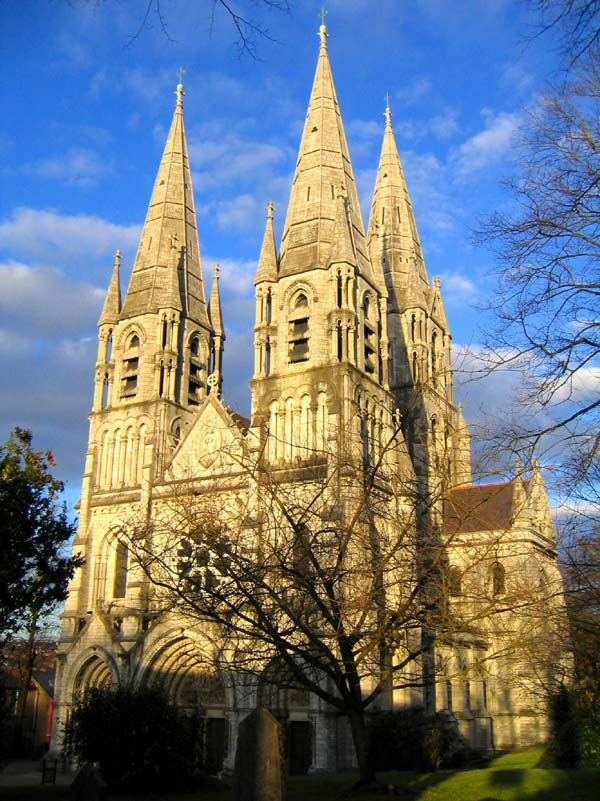
Saint Fin Barre's Cathedral, Cork, Ireland – Burges's first major commission

Despite early competition setbacks, Burges was sustained by his belief that Early French provided the answer to the crisis of architectural style that beset mid-Victorian England, writing "I was brought up in the thirteenth century belief and in that belief I intend to die"; and in 1863, at the age of 35, he finally secured his first major commission, for Saint Fin Barre's Cathedral, Cork. Burges's diary records his delight at the result: "Got Cork!"

Saint Fin Barre's was to be the first new cathedral built in the British Isles since St Paul's. The competition occurred as a result of widespread dissatisfaction with the existing church of 1735 which the Dublin Builder described as "a shabby apology for a cathedral which has long disgraced Cork." The proposed budget was low, at £15,000, but Burges ignored this constraint, producing a design that he admitted would cost twice as much. Despite the protestations of fellow competitors, it won, though the final cost was to be in excess of £100,000.

Burges, who had worked in Ireland before, at the Church of St Peter, Carrigrohane, at the Holy Trinity Church Templebreedy, at Frankfield and at Douglas, enjoyed strong local support, including that of the Bishop, John Gregg. In addition, as the Ireland Handbook notes, Burges "combined his love of medievalism with a conspicuous display of Protestant affluence" which was an important factor at a time when the established Anglican Church in Ireland was seeking to assert its predominance.

For the exterior, Burges re-used some of his earlier unexecuted plans, the overall design from the Crimea Memorial Church and St John's Cathedral, Brisbane, the elevations from Lille Cathedral. The main problem of the building was its size. Despite the prodigious efforts of its fundraisers, and despite Burges exceeding the original budget, Cork was still unable to afford a really large cathedral. Burges overcame this obstacle by using the grandeur of his three-spired exterior to offset the lesser scale of the remainder of the building.

Although the cathedral is modest in size, it is very richly ornamented. As was his usual practice, from his office in Buckingham Street and in the course of many site visits, Burges oversaw all aspects of the design, including the statuary, the stained glass and the furniture, charging 10% rather than his usual 5%, owing to the high level of his personal involvement. He drew designs for every one of the 1,260 sculptures that adorn the West Front and decorate the building inside and out. He sketched cartoons for the majority of the 74 stained glass windows. He designed the mosaic pavement, the altar, the pulpit and the bishop's throne. Lawrence and Wilson consider the result "undoubtedly [Burges's] greatest work in ecclesiastical architecture" with an interior that is "overwhelming and intoxicating." Through his ability, by the careful leadership of his team, by total artistic control, and by vastly exceeding the intended budget of £15,000, Burges produced a building that in size is little more than a large parish church but in impression is described in Lawrence and Wilson's study as "a cathedral becoming such a city and one which posterity may regard as a monument to the Almighty's praise."

== Architectural team ==
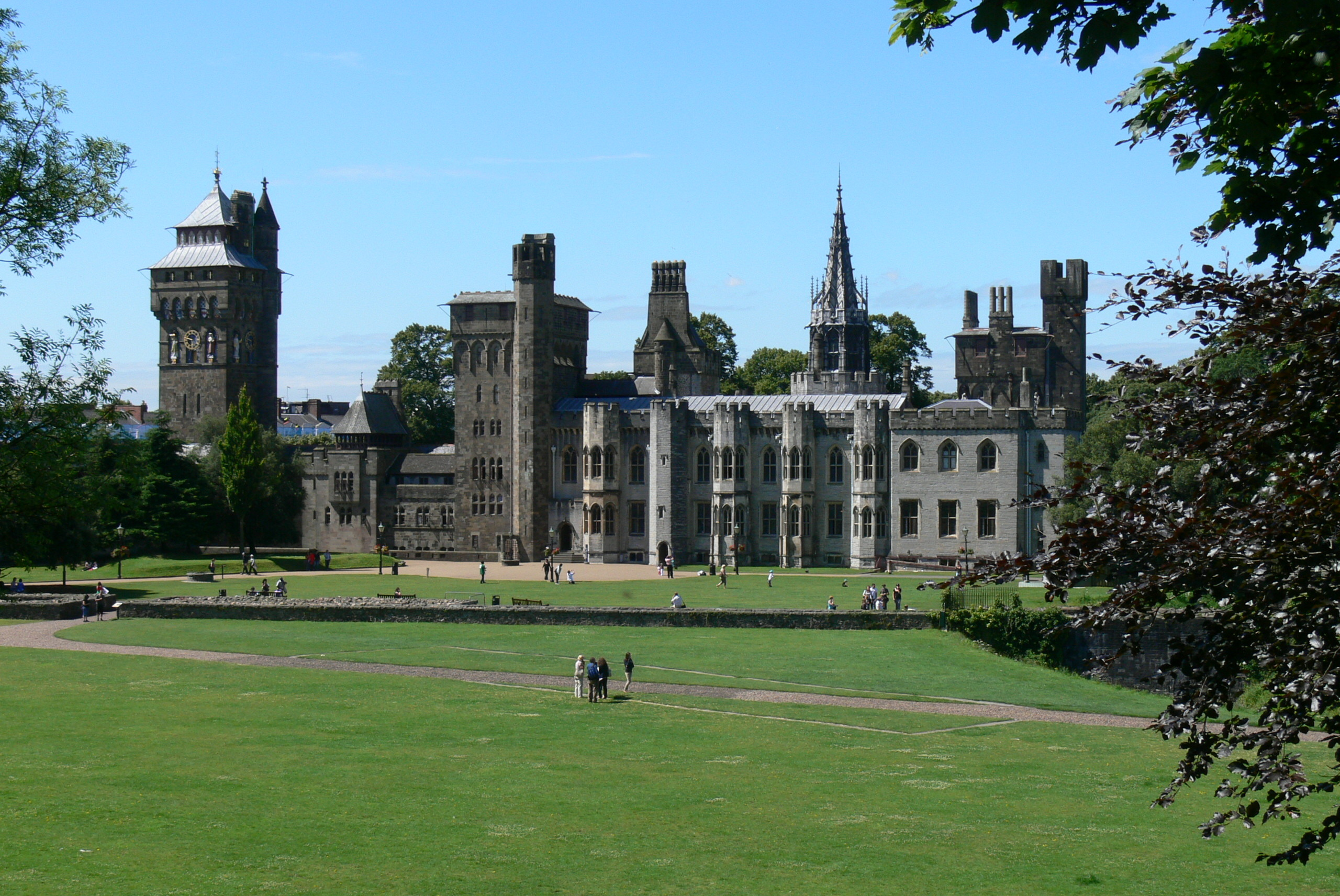
Cardiff Castle, worked on by many members of Burges's architectural team

Burges inspired considerable loyalty within his team of assistants, and his partnerships were long-lived. John Starling Chapple was the office manager, joining Burges's practice in 1859. It was Chapple, designer of most of the furniture for Castell Coch, who completed its restoration after Burges's death. Second to Chapple was William Frame, who acted as clerk of works. Horatio Walter Lonsdale was Burges's chief artist, contributing extensive murals for both Castell Coch and Cardiff Castle. His main sculptor was Thomas Nicholls who started with Burges at Cork, completing hundreds of figures for Saint Fin Barre's Cathedral, worked with him on his two major churches in Yorkshire, and undertook all of the original carving for the Animal Wall at Cardiff.

William Gualbert Saunders joined the Buckingham Street team in 1865 and worked with Burges on the development of the design and techniques of stained-glass manufacture, producing much of the best glass for Saint Fin Barre's. Ceccardo Egidio Fucigna was another long-time collaborator who sculpted the Madonna and Child above the drawbridge at Castell Coch, the figure of St John over the mantelpiece in Lord Bute's bedroom at Cardiff Castle and the bronze Madonna in the roof garden. Lastly, there was Axel Haig, a Swedish-born illustrator, who prepared many of the watercolour perspectives with which Burges entranced his clients. Crook calls them "a group of talented men, moulded in their master's image, art-architects and medievalists to a man – jokers and jesters too – devoted above all to art rather than to business."

== Partnership with the Marquess of Bute ==
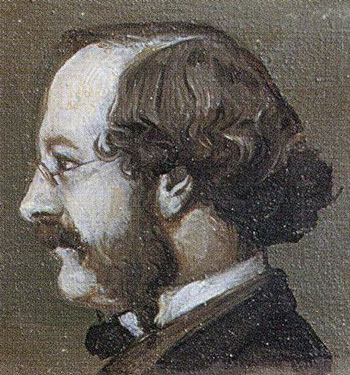
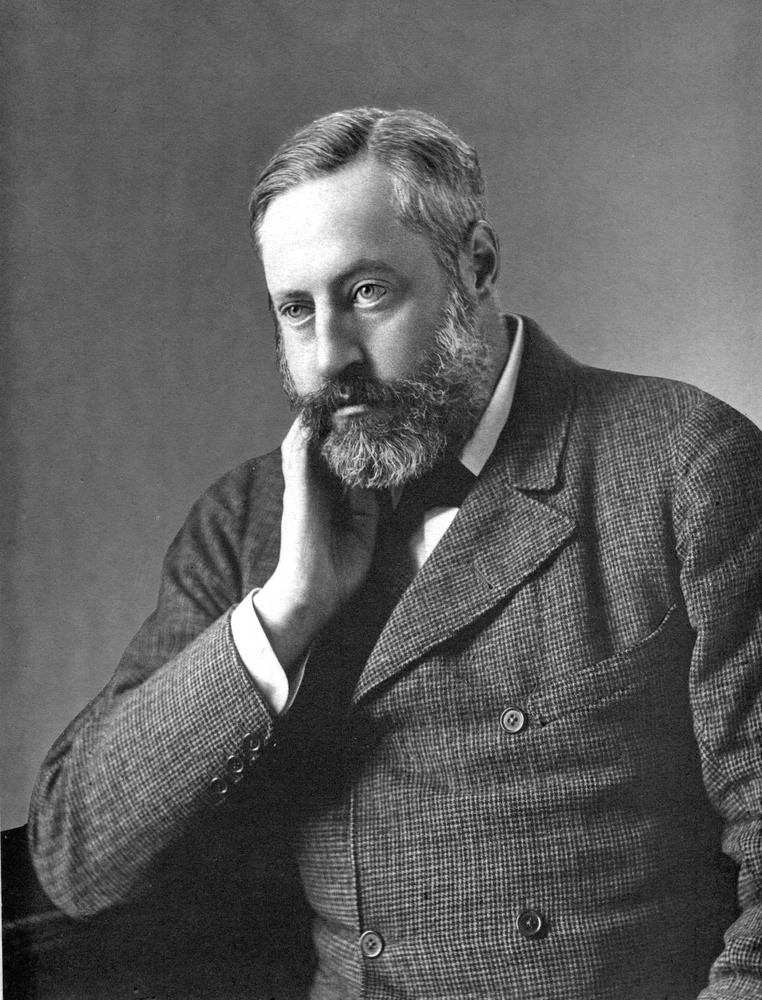
Burges and Bute. Left:An 1875 painting of Burges by Edward Poynter. Right:Portrait of John Patrick Crichton-Stuart, 3rd Marquess of Bute

In 1865, Burges met John Patrick Crichton-Stuart, 3rd Marquess of Bute. This may have resulted from Alfred Burges's engineering firm, Walker, Burges and Cooper, having undertaken work on the East Bute Docks in Cardiff for the second Marquess. (Note: Pauline Sargent, a member of the South Glamorgan County Architects department and curator of an exhibition of Burges drawings and stained glass cartoons held at Cardiff Castle from July to August 1977 suggests that John (James) McConnochie may have made the introduction. McConnochie was employed by Burges, Walker and Cooper, Burges's father's firm, and subsequently worked for Bute as Chief Engineer at Cardiff Docks.) The 3rd Marquess became Burges's greatest architectural patron; both were men of their times; both had fathers whose industrial endeavours provided the means for their sons' architectural achievements, and both sought to "redeem the evils of industrialism by re-living the art of the Middle Ages".

On his succession to the Marquessate at the age of one, Bute inherited an income of £300,000 a year, and, by the time he met Burges, he was considered the richest man in Britain, if not the world. Bute's wealth was important to the success of the partnership: as Burges himself wrote, "Good art is far too rare and far too precious ever to be cheap." But, as a scholar, antiquarian, compulsive builder and enthusiastic medievalist, Bute brought more than money to the relationship and his resources and his interests allied with Burges's genius to create what David McLees considers to be "Bute's most memorable overall achievement."

A prime example of the partnership of aristocratic patron and talented architect produc[ing] the marvels of Cardiff Castle and Castell Coch.

— Dixon and Muthesius characterising the relationship between Burges and Bute.

However occasioned, the connection lasted the rest of Burges's life and led to his most important works. To the Marquess and his wife, Burges was the "soul-inspiring one". The architectural writer Michael Hall considers Burges's rebuilding of Cardiff Castle and the complete reconstruction of the ruin of Castell Coch, north of the city, as representing his highest achievements. In these buildings, Crook contends that Burges escaped into "a world of architectural fantasy" which Hall describes as "amongst the most magnificent the Gothic Revival ever achieved."

=== Cardiff Castle ===
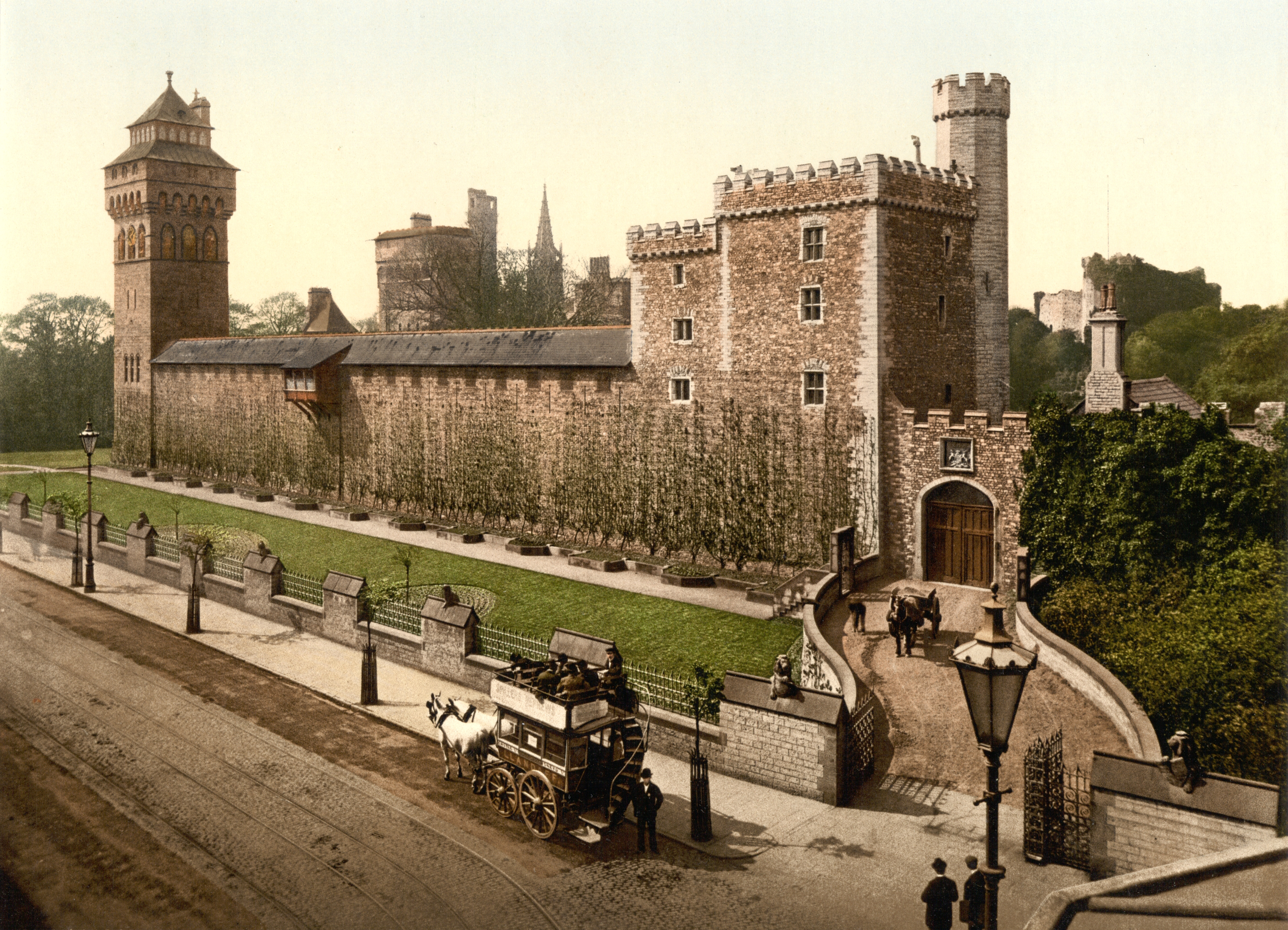
Cardiff Castle in the 1890s

In the early nineteenth century, the original Norman castle had been enlarged and refashioned by Henry Holland for the 1st Marquess of Bute, the 3rd Marquess's great-grandfather. The 2nd Marquess occupied the castle on visits to his extensive Glamorgan estates, during which he developed modern Cardiff and created Cardiff Docks as the outlet for coal and steel from the South Wales Valleys, but did little to the castle itself, beyond completing the 1st Marquess's work.

The 3rd Marquess despised Holland's efforts, describing the castle as having been "the victim of every barbarism since the Renaissance", and, on his coming of age, engaged Burges to undertake rebuilding on a Wagnerian scale. Almost all of Burges's usual team were involved, including Chapple, Frame and Lonsdale, creating a building which John Newman describes in Glamorgan: The Buildings of Wales as the "most successful of all the fantasy castles of the nineteenth century."

The skyline of the capital of Wales[:] the dream of one great patron and one great architect has almost become the symbol of a whole nation

— Crook describing the castle's silhouette.

Work began in 1868 with the 150 feet high Clock Tower, in Forest of Dean ashlar. The tower forms a suite of bachelor's rooms, the Marquess not marrying until 1872. They comprise a bedroom, a servant's room and the Summer and Winter Smoking Rooms. Externally, the tower is a re-working of a design Burges used for the unsuccessful Law Courts competition. Internally, the rooms are sumptuously decorated with gilding, carvings and cartoons, many allegorical in style, depicting the seasons, myths and fables. In his A History of the Gothic Revival, written as the tower was being built, Charles Locke Eastlake wrote of Burges's "peculiar talents (and) luxuriant fancy." The Summer Smoking Room is the tower's literal and metaphorical culmination. It rises two storeys high and has an internal balcony that, through an unbroken band of windows, gives views to Cardiff docks, one source of Bute's wealth, the Bristol Channel, and the Welsh hills and valleys. The floor has a map of the world in mosaic and the sculpture is by Thomas Nicholls.

As the castle was developed, work continued with alterations to Holland's Georgian range, including his Bute Tower, and to the medieval Herbert and Beauchamp Towers, and the construction of the Guest Tower and the Octagonal Tower. In plan, the castle broadly follows the arrangement of a standard Victorian stately home. The Bute Tower includes Lord Bute's bedroom and ends in another highlight, the Roof Garden, with a sculpture of the Madonna by Fucigna and painted tiles by Lonsdale. Bute's bedroom has much religious iconography and a mirrored ceiling. The Marquess's name, John, is repeated in Greek, ΙΩΑИΣ, along the ceiling beams. The Octagon Tower followed, including the oratory, built on the spot where Bute's father died, and the Chaucer Room, the roof of which Mark Girouard cites as "a superb ... example of Burges's genius in the construction of roofs." The Guest Tower contains the site of the original kitchen at its base and above, the Nursery, decorated with painted tiles depicting Aesop's Fables and characters from nursery rhymes.

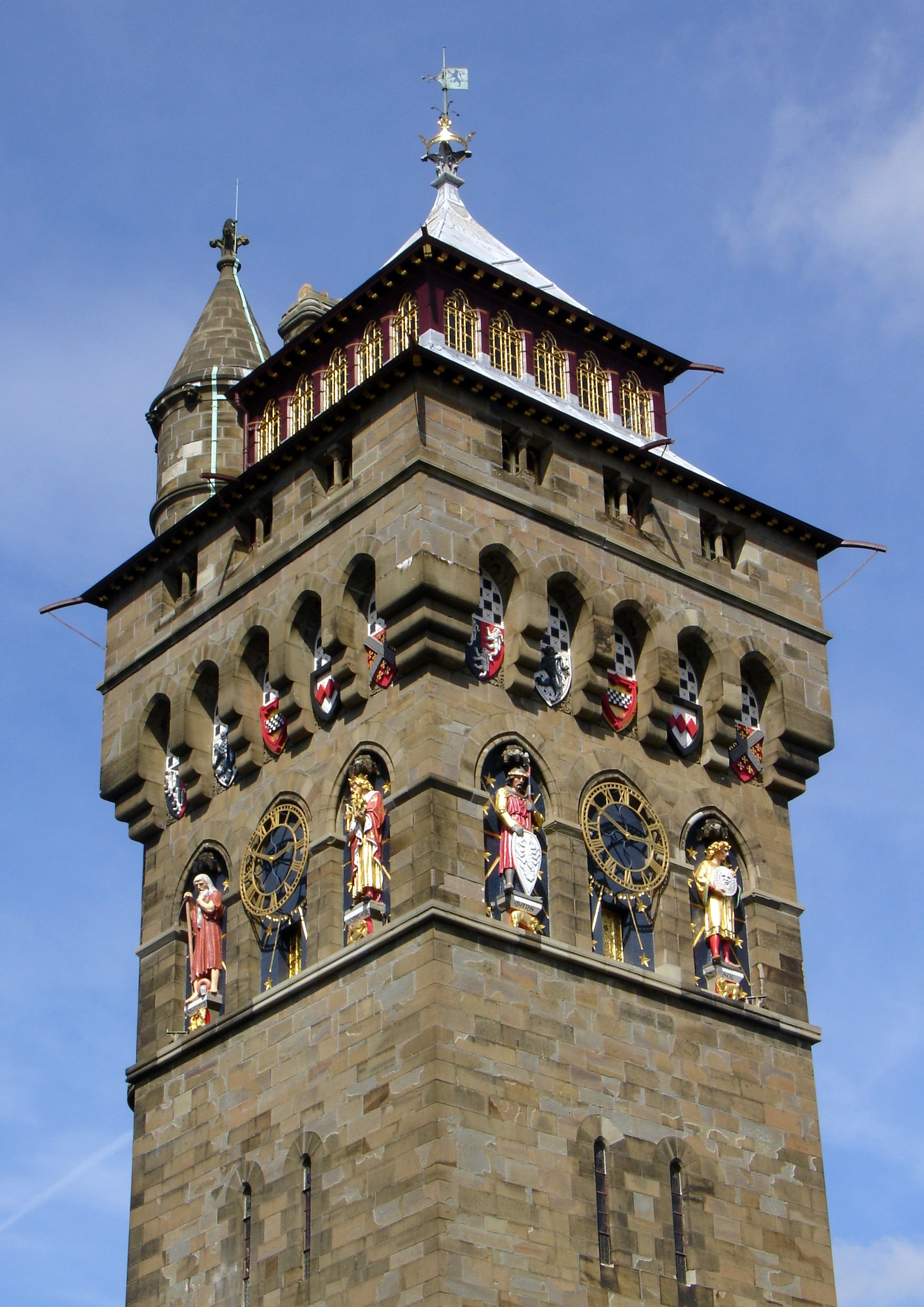
The Clock Tower, Cardiff Castle

The central block of the castle comprises the two-storey banqueting hall, with the library below. Both are enormous, the former to act as a suitable reception hall where the Marquess could fulfil his civic duties, the latter to hold part of his vast library. Both include elaborate carvings and fireplaces, those in the banqueting hall depicting the castle itself in the time of Robert, Duke of Normandy, who was imprisoned there in 1126–1134. The fireplace in the library contains five figures, four representing the Greek, Egyptian, Hebrew and Assyrian alphabets, while the fifth is said to represent Bute as a Celtic monk. The figures refer to the purpose of the room and to the Marquess, a noted linguist. The decoration of these large rooms is less successful than in the smaller chambers; much was completed after Burges's death and Girouard considers that the muralist, Lonsdale, "was required to cover areas rather greater than his talents deserved."

The central portion of the castle also included the Grand Staircase. Illustrated in a watercolour perspective prepared by Axel Haig, the staircase was long thought never to have been built but recent research has shown that it was constructed, only to be torn out in the 1930s, reputedly after the third Marchioness had "once slipped on its polished surface." The staircase was not universally praised in the contemporary press; the Building News writing that the design was "one of the least happy we have seen from Mr Burges's pencil...the contrasts of colour are more startling than pleasing." The Arab Room in the Herbert Tower was the last room on which Burges was working when he fell ill in 1881. Bute placed Burges's initials, together with his own and the date, in the fireplace of that room as a memorial. The room was completed by Burges's brother-in-law, Richard Popplewell Pullan.

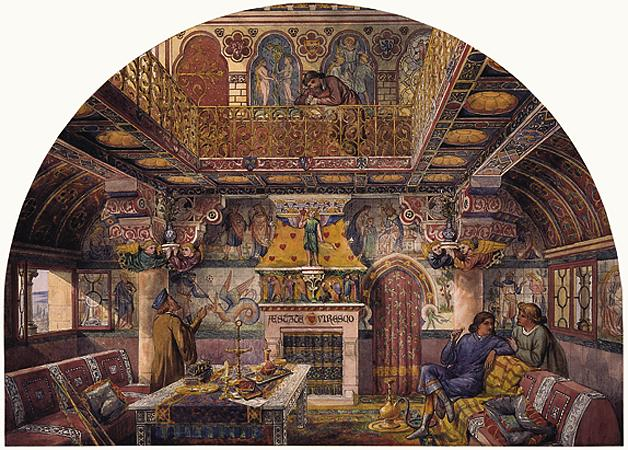
Burges's design for the Summer Smoking Room at Cardiff Castle

Following Burges's death, further areas of the castle were developed along the lines he had set by, amongst others, William Frame. This included extensive reconstruction of the walls of the original Roman fort. The Animal Wall, completed in the 1920s by the 4th Marquess, originally stood between the castle moat and the city and has nine sculptures by Thomas Nicholls, with a further six sculpted by Alexander Carrick in the 1930s. The Swiss Bridge, which crossed the leat to Bute Park, was moved in the 1920s and demolished in the 1960s. The stables, which lie to the north on the edge of Bute Park, were designed by Burges in 1868–69 but were not completed until the 1920s.

Megan Aldrich contends that Burges's interiors at Cardiff have "rarely [been] equalled, [although] he executed few buildings as his rich fantastic gothic required equally rich patrons (..) his finished works are outstanding monuments to nineteenth century gothic", the suites of rooms he created at Cardiff being amongst "the most magnificent that the gothic revival ever achieved." Crook goes further still, arguing that the rooms reach beyond architecture to create "three dimensional passports to fairy kingdoms and realms of gold. In Cardiff Castle we enter a land of dreams".

The Castle was given to Cardiff City Corporation by the 5th Marquess of Bute in 1947.

=== Castell Coch ===
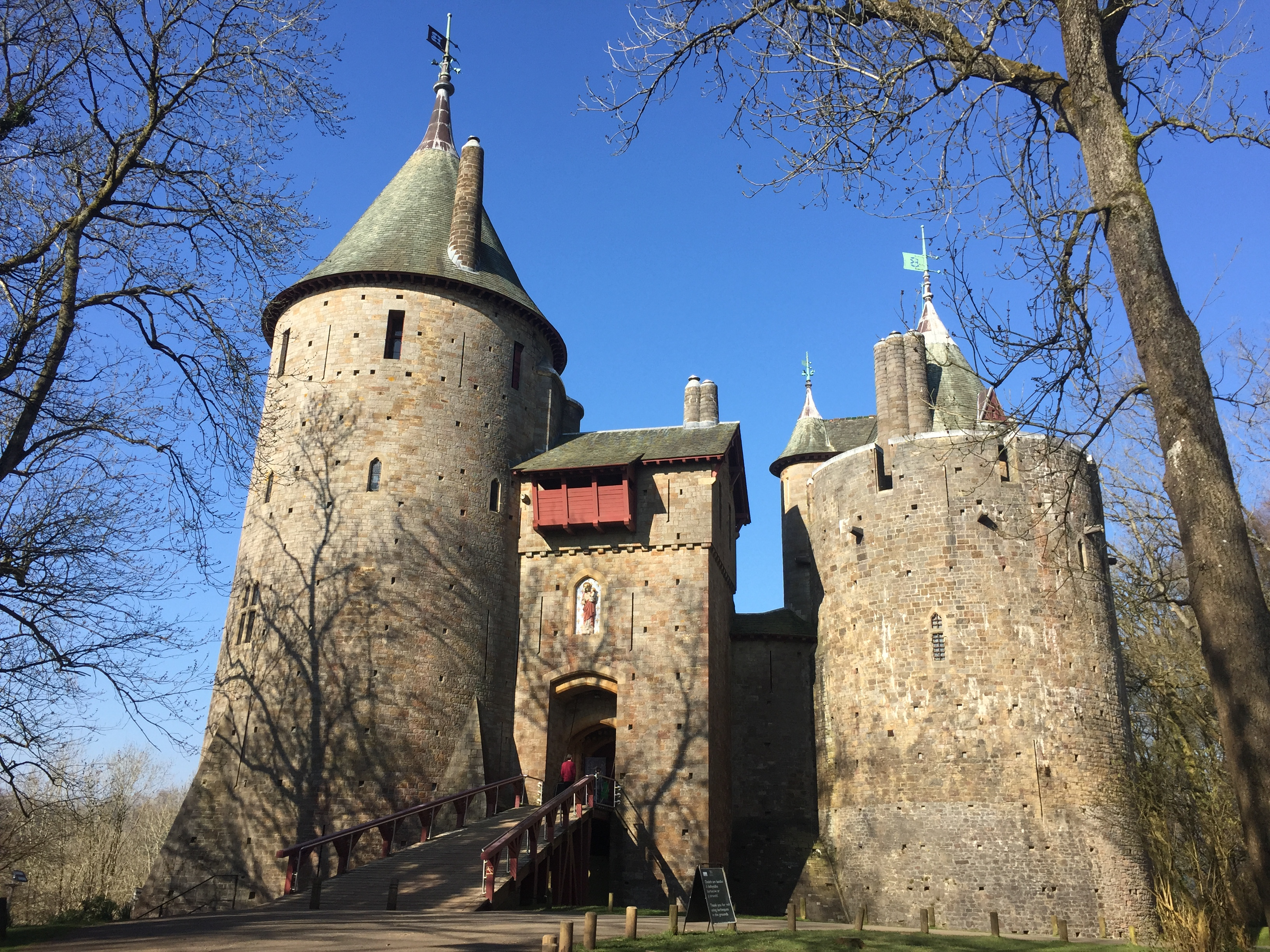
Castell Coch

In 1872, while work at Cardiff Castle was proceeding, Burges presented a scheme for the complete reconstruction of Castell Coch, a ruined thirteenth-century fort on the Bute estate to the north of Cardiff. Burges's report on the possible reconstruction was delivered in 1872 but building was delayed until 1875, in part because of the pressure of works at Cardiff Castle and in part because of an unfounded concern on behalf of the Marquess's trustees that he was facing bankruptcy.

The exterior comprises three towers, described by Newman as "almost equal to each other in diameter, [but] arrestingly dissimilar in height." Burges's main inspiration was the work of the almost contemporaneous French architect Eugène Viollet-le-Duc who was undertaking similar restoration and building work for Napoleon III. Viollet-le-Duc's work at the Château de Coucy, The Louvre and particularly at the Château de Pierrefonds is echoed at Castell Coch, Burges's Drawing Room roof drawing heavily on the octagonal, rib-vaulted chambre de l'Imperatrice at Pierrefonds. Burges noted that many the English Gothic Revivalists of his generation drew on Viollet-le-Duc's work, though few would have read his publications. Burges's other main source was the Château de Chillon, from which his conical, and conjectural, tower roofs are derived.

Severely damaged during Welsh rebellions in the early fourteenth century, Castell Coch fell into disuse and by the Tudor period, the antiquary John Leland described it as "all in ruin no big thing but high." A set of drawings for the planned rebuilding exists, together with a full architectural justification by Burges. The castle reconstruction features three conical roofs to the towers that are historically questionable. According to Crook, Burges "supported his roofs with a considerable body of examples of doubtful validity; the truth was that he wanted them for their architectural effect."

The distant view, of unequal drum towers rising under candlesnuffer roofs from the wooded hillside, is irresistibly appealing. Here the castle of romantic dreams is given substance.

— Newman describing the prospect of Castell Coch.

The Keep Tower, the Well Tower and the Kitchen Tower comprise a series of apartments, of which the main sequence, the Castellan's Rooms, lie within the Keep. They begin weakly, the Banqueting Hall, completed well after Burges's death, being described by Newman as "dilute [and] unfocused" while Crook considers it "anaemic." It contains a colossal chimney piece, carved by Thomas Nicholls. The identity of the central figure in the overmantel is uncertain; Girouard states that it is King David while McLees suggests that it depicts St Lucius. The Drawing Room is a double-height room with decoration that Newman describes as illustrating the "intertwined themes (of) the fecundity of nature and the fragility of life." A stone fireplace by Nicholls features the Three Fates, spinning, measuring and cutting the thread of life. The murals around the walls draw on Aesop's Fables with delicate drawings of animals in the Aesthetic Movement style.

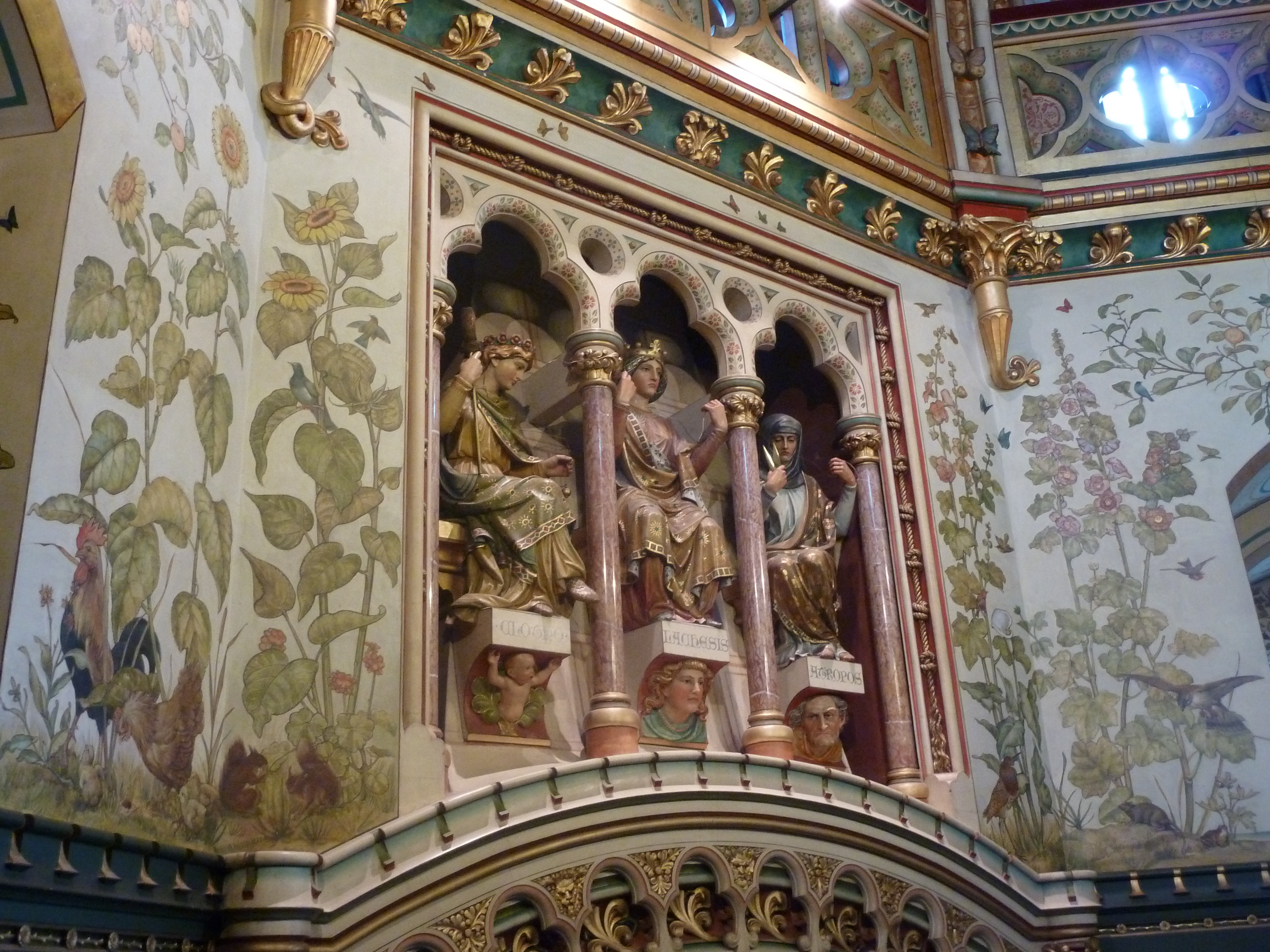
The Three Fates chimneypiece, Castell Coch

The octagonal chamber with its great rib-vault, modelled on Viollet-le-Duc's chambers at Coucy and Pierrefonds, is decorated with drawings of butterflies and birds. Off the hall lies the Windlass Room, in which Burges delighted in assembling the fully functioning apparatus for the drawbridge, together with murder-holes for expelling boiling oil. The Marquess's bedroom provides some spartan relief before the culmination of the castle, Lady Bute's Bedroom. Crook considers this room "pure Burges: an arcaded circle, punched through by window embrasures, and topped by a trefoil-sectioned dome." The decorative theme is 'love', symbolised by monkeys, pomegranates and nesting birds. The decoration was completed long after Burges's death but his was the guiding spirit. "Would Mr Burges have done it?" William Frame wrote to Thomas Nicholls in 1887. Burges's original design for the castle included a chapel to be built on the roof of the Well Tower. It was never finished and the remains were removed in the late nineteenth century.

Following Burges's death in 1881, work on the interior continued for another ten years. The castle was little used, the Marquess never came after its completion, and its main function was as a family sanatorium, although the Marchioness and her daughter, Lady Margaret Crichton-Stuart, did occupy it for a period following the death of the Marquess in 1900. In 1950, the 5th Marquess of Bute handed the castle over to the Ministry of Works. McLees views it as "one of the greatest Victorian triumphs of architectural composition", whilst Crook writes of Burges "recreating from a heap of rubble a fairy-tale castle which seems almost to have materialised from the margins of a medieval manuscript."

== Later works ==
Bute's commissions formed the major corpus of Burges's work from the 1860s until his death. However, he continued to accept other appointments.

=== Worcester College, Oxford ===
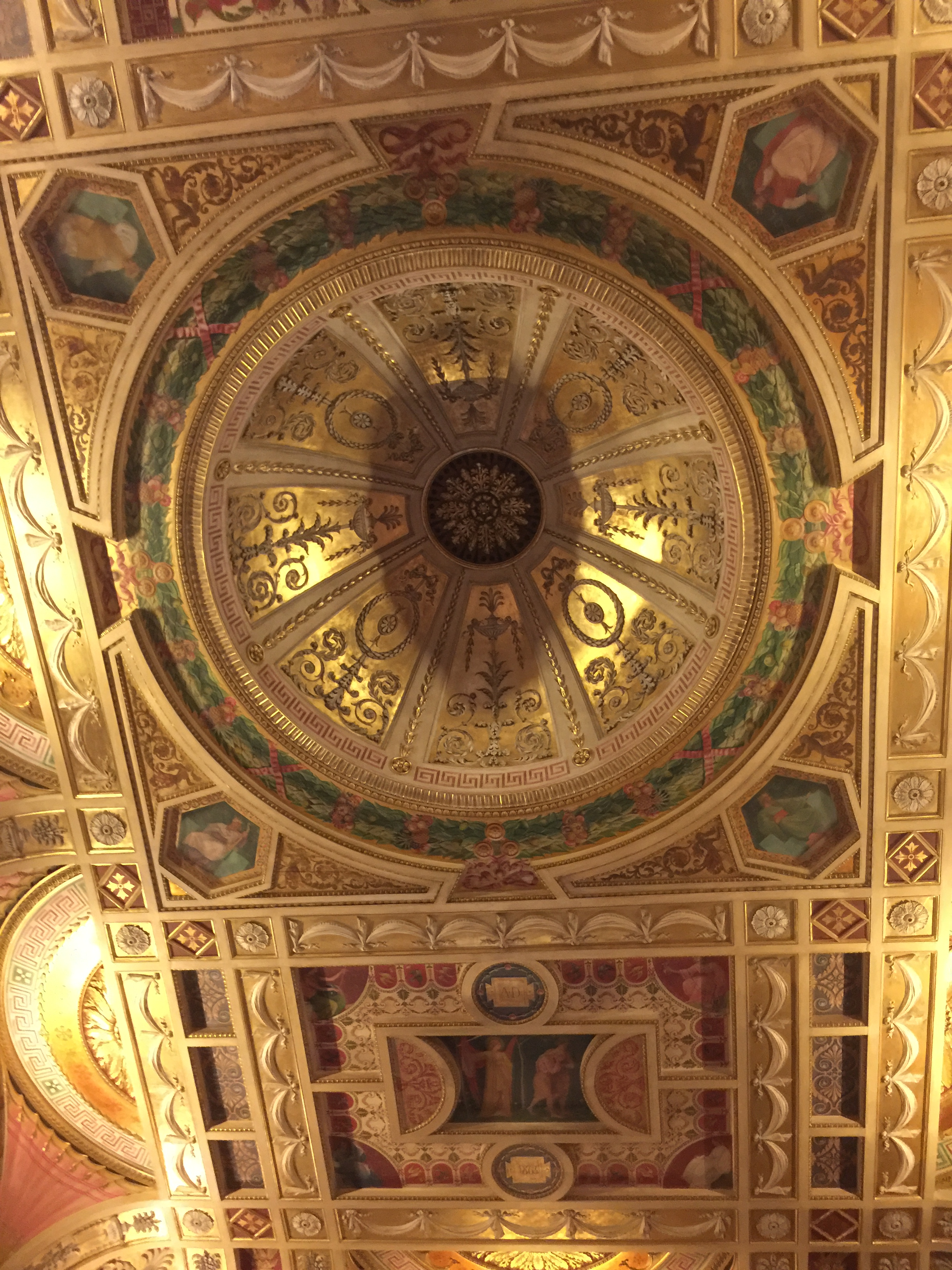
Ceiling by Burges

The interiors of the Hall and Chapel of Worcester College, Oxford, had been designed by James Wyatt in 1776–90. In 1864, Burges was commissioned to overhaul Wyatt's unremarkable designs for the chapel by the Reverend H. C. O. Daniel, a member of the college's Senior Common Room and future Provost, who had known Burges when they were contemporaries at King's College London. Burges's extensive iconography envelopes the building, with animals and birds depicted on the end of pews, and Burges's mosaic flooring astonished his contemporaries.

Drawing on his rare knowledge of medieval techniques and working with his meticulous attention to detail, Burges created a chapel that Crook describes as "almost unique amongst High Victorian ecclesiastical interiors." The richly symbolic iconography" and Masonic influences on the scheme of decoration are significant, Gillingham suggesting that Burges's Freemasonry connections were a partial explanation for his appointment and noting that a "symbolic masonic commentary pervades the Chapel. Unusually, in the redecoration of the Chapel, Burges did not use members of his usual team. The stained glass and the ceiling paintings are by Henry Holiday, and the statues, lectern and candlesticks are by William Grinsell Nicholl.

Exit Burges. [The college fellows] will be sorry in fifty years.

— Pevsner on the College Fellows' decision to remove Burges's work in the Hall and reinstate that of Wyatt.

In 1873–79 Burges undertook a redecoration of the College's Hall. The funds needed for the Hall were raised by an appeal in which the decorated wooden panels on the walls were individual gifts, incorporating the crests and shields of the donors. In some cases, where there were no known crests or shields, those of former members were substituted and Burges made several painted imitations of marbling on wood. The large window at the end of the Hall was also filled with the armorial bearings for which room had not been found in the panels. A fireplace was also inserted on the dais. Almost all of Burges's work in the Hall was lost in a redevelopment of the 1960s in which Wyatt's designs were reinstated, although the fireplace was removed to Knightshayes Court and the East Window, above the high table, was restored circa 2009.

=== Skilbeck's Warehouse ===
Skilbeck's Warehouse, formerly at 46 Upper Thames Street, London, and now demolished, was a drysalter's warehouse constructed by Burges in 1866 and is important as his only foray into industrial design. Burges was commissioned by the Skilbeck Brothers to remodel an existing warehouse; the result was influential, Eastlake describing it as, "one of the very few instances of the successful adaptation of Gothic for commercial purposes". Bradley writes of Burges's remodelling as using "twin pointed bays under a single Gothic relieving arch and gable".

The use of exposed cast iron was revolutionary. Modern materials and technologies were combined with gothic iconography, an article of 1886 in The Ecclesiologist describing "the great crane supported by a corbel carved into a bust of a fair Oriental maid, symbolising the clime from which so much of the drysalter's materials are brought, and over a circular window in the gable (a) ship bringing in its precious freight." The total cost of the work was £1,413.

=== Knightshayes Court ===
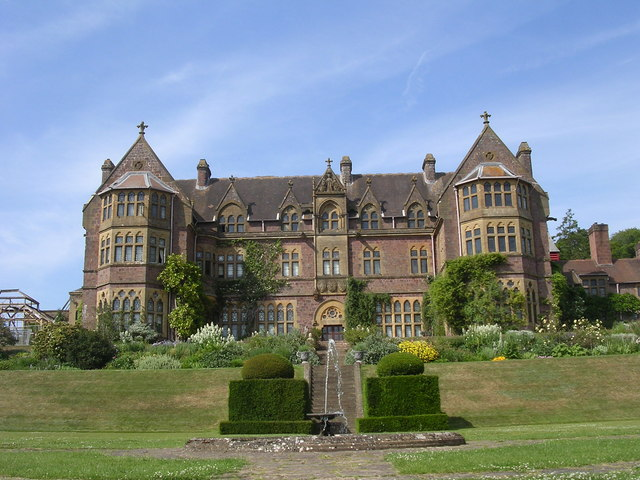
Knightshayes Court, Tiverton, Devon

The commission for the brand new house of Knightshayes Court was obtained from Sir John Heathcoat-Amory in 1867 and the foundation stone was laid in 1869. By 1874, the building was still incomplete, owing to ongoing difficulties with Heathcoat-Amory, who objected to many of Burges's designs on the grounds of cost and of style. Although work had begun on the interior, the turbulent relationship between architect and client led to Burges's sacking in 1874 and his replacement by John Dibblee Crace. Nevertheless, Knightshayes Court remains the only example of a medium-sized Burges country house, built in a standard Victorian arrangement. Early French Gothic in style, it follows a standard neo-Tudor plan of a large central block with projecting gables. The tower Burges planned was never built.

Judging by the mix-and-match style of its construction, evidently they [Heathcoat-Amory and Burges] never quite managed to agree on the eventual style of the house. Burges' obsession with the Middle Ages resulted in a plethora of stone curlicues, ornate mantles and carved figurines, but Amory preferred austere Victorian grandeur, best seen in the billiard room and the ornate boudoir.

— David Else commenting on the design of Knightshayes Court in the Lonely Planet Guide to England.

The interior was to have been a riot of Burgesian excess but not a single room was completed to Burges's designs. Of the few interior features that were fully executed, much was altered or diluted by Heathcoat-Amory and his successors. However some of the interiors, such as the library, vaulted hall and the arched red drawing room, remain or have been re-instated.

Since the house passed to the National Trust in 1972, major works of restoration and re-creation have been undertaken and a number of pieces of Burges furniture, mostly not original to the house, are displayed. These include a bookcase from Buckingham Street and a chimney piece from the Hall at Worcester College, Oxford, where, in the 1960s, some decorative works by Burges were removed, although his redecoration of the college Chapel remains. The aim is, as far as possible, to reinstate the work of Burges and Crace.

=== Park House ===
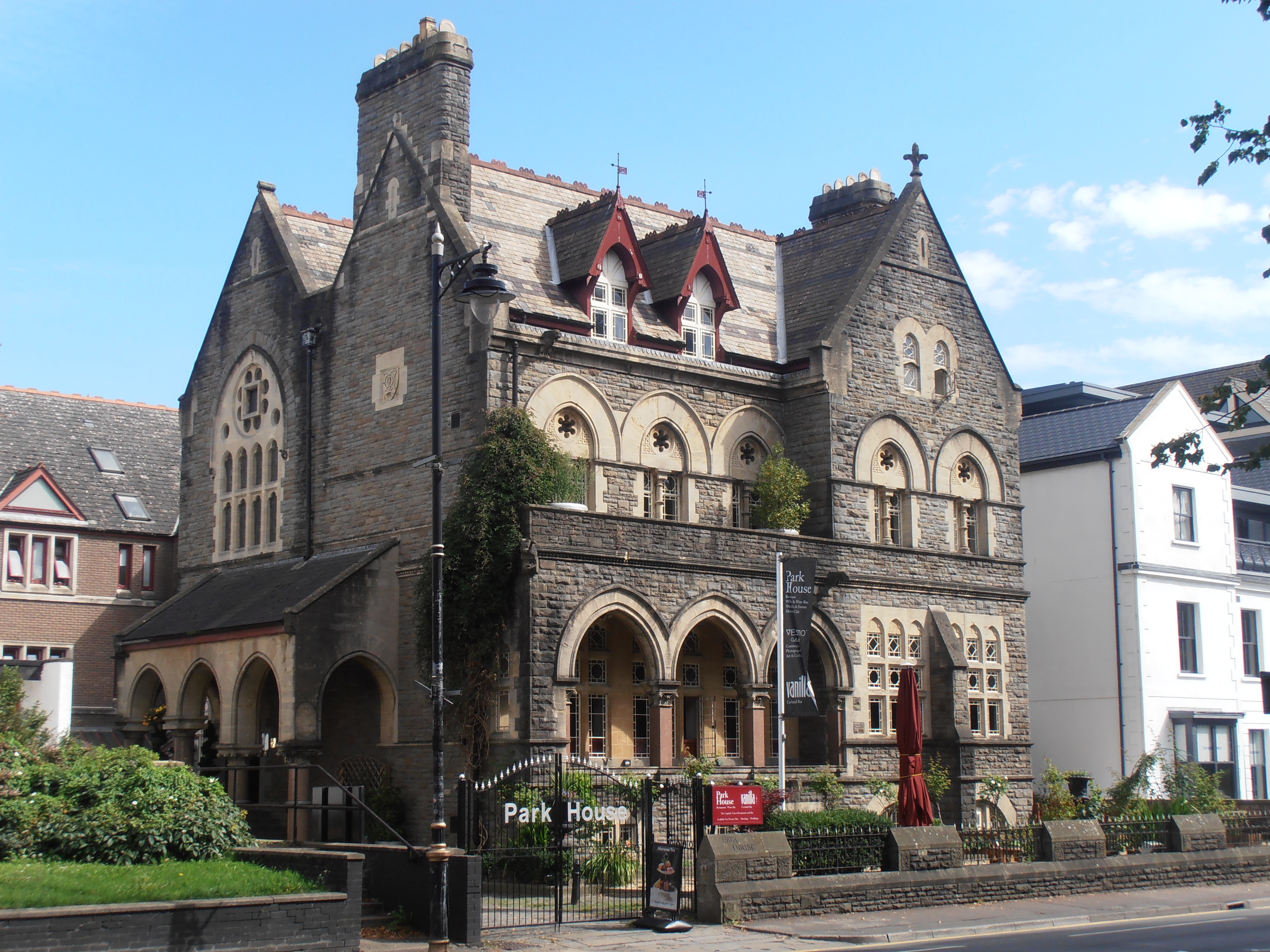
Park House, Park Place, Cardiff

Park House, Cardiff, was built by Burges for Lord Bute's engineer, James McConnochie, between 1871 and 1875. With its steep roofs and boldly textured walls, Park House revolutionised Cardiff's domestic architecture, and was highly influential, in the city and beyond. The impact of the building can be seen in many of Cardiff's inner suburbs, where imitations of Park House and its features can frequently be identified. Cadw described it as "perhaps the most important 19th century house in Wales", a position reflected in its status as a Grade I listed building.

The style of the house is Early French Gothic, with triangle and rectangle to the fore, although it is without the conical tower Burges considered appropriate both for his own home, The Tower House and for Castell Coch. Burges used various building stones for Park House: Pennant Sandstone for the walls, Bath Stone around the windows, entrance porch and plinths, with pillars in pink Peterhead granite from Aberdeenshire. The external frontage comprises four gables, the windows of the last gable concealing what Newman describes as "the major peculiarity of the interior. On entering, one is immediately confronted by the underside of the staircase, and has to skirt round it to reach the rest of the house." The arrangement was not repeated at The Tower House, which is an almost reversed replica with added conical tower. The interior fittings are of high quality, including the massive, mahogany staircase and marble chimneypieces. Both the drawing room and the dining room have beamed ceilings. The whole is built with a solidity that was guaranteed by the use of the Marquess of Bute's own workforce from Cardiff Docks. Henry-Russell Hitchcock, the American architecture critic, considered Park House "one of the best medium-sized stone dwellings of the High Victorian Gothic".

=== Christ the Consoler, St Mary's and St Paul's Cathedral ===
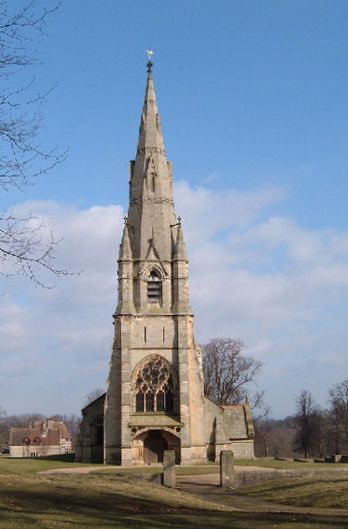
Church of St Mary, Studley Royal

Burges's two finest gothic churches were also undertaken in the 1870s, the Church of Christ the Consoler, Skelton-on-Ure, and St Mary's, Studley Royal. His patron, George Robinson, 1st Marquess of Ripon, although not as rich as Bute, was his equal in romantic medievalism and had been a friend of Bute's at Oxford, which may account for the choice of Burges as architect. Both churches were built as memorial churches for Ripon's brother-in-law, Frederick Grantham Vyner, who was murdered by Greek bandits in 1870. Vyner's mother commissioned the Church of Christ the Consoler and his sister St Mary's. Both begun in 1870, Skelton was consecrated in 1876 and Studley Royal in 1878.

The Church of Christ the Consoler, in the grounds of Newby Hall in North Yorkshire, is built in the Early English style. (Note: Burges also undertook some remodelling of the grounds of Newby Hall, including the pair of gates, with piers, on the eastern front.) The exterior is constructed of grey Catraig stone, with Morcar stone for the mouldings. The interior is faced with white limestone, and richly fitted out with marble. The work was undertaken by members of Burges's usual team, Gualbert Saunders making the stained glass, from cartoons by Lonsdale, and Nicholls sculpting the carvings. Leach and Pevsner describe the scheme of stained glass as "uncommonly excellent." It is particularly interesting as representing an architectural move from Burges's favourite Early French style to an English inspiration. Pevsner considers it: "Of determined originality; the impression is one of great opulence, even if of a somewhat elephantine calibre."

Our ancestors had their churches made as beautiful as they could afford. A great cathedral must have been an encyclopedia of all the knowledge at the time ... It is only by acting in a similar manner that we shall ever progress and have an art of our own.

— Burges commenting on churches in 1867.

The Church of St Mary, Studley Royal, is also in the Early English style and is located in the grounds of Studley Royal Park at Fountains Abbey, in North Yorkshire. As at Christ the Consoler, the exterior is of grey limestone, with a two-stage west tower topped with a soaring spire. The interior is equally spectacular, exceeding Skelton in richness and majesty, Leach commenting that "everything is precisely calculated as to its visual impact." The theme, previously used at Gayhurst, is Paradise Lost and Paradise Regained. The stained glass, by Saunders & Co, is of particularly high quality. Pevsner describes St Mary's as "a dream of Early English glory" and Crook writes, "[although] Cork Cathedral may stand as Burges's greatest Gothic work, Studley Royal is his 'ecclesiastical' masterpiece." Burges also constructed an estate cottage in 1873.

In 1870, Burges was asked to draw up an iconographic scheme of internal decoration for St Paul's Cathedral, unfinished since the death of Sir Christopher Wren. In 1872, he was appointed architect and over the next five years produced what Crook describes as a "full-blown scheme of early Renaissance decoration" for the interior which he intended would eclipse that of St Peter's in Rome. These designs were presented in the form of three architectural models at the Royal Academy Summer Exhibition in 1874 to much controversy. As Crook writes, his plans were "rather too creative for most Classicists" and these artistic, and linked religious, controversies led to Burges's dismissal in 1877 with none of his plans undertaken.

=== Trinity College, Hartford, Connecticut ===
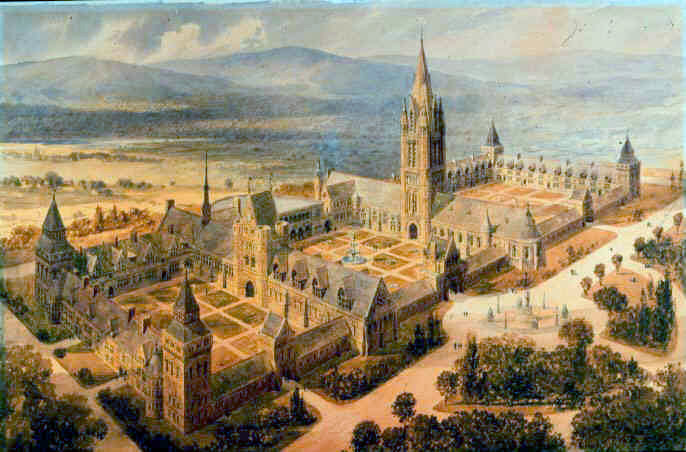
Trinity College, Hartford: Burges's revised, three-quadrangle, masterplan

In 1872, Abner Jackson, the President of Trinity College, Connecticut, visited Britain, seeking models and an architect for a planned new campus for the college. Burges was chosen and he drew up a four-quadrangled masterplan, in his Early French style. Lavish illustrations were produced by Axel Haig. However, the estimated cost, at just under one million dollars, together with the sheer scale of the plans, thoroughly alarmed the College Trustees.

Only one-sixth of the plan was executed, the present Long Walk, with Francis H. Kimball acting as local, supervising, architect, and Frederick Law Olmsted laying out the grounds. Crook considers the result, "unsatisfactory … [but important] … in its key position in the development of late nineteenth-century American architecture." Other critics have viewed Burges's design more positively: the American architectural historian Henry-Russell Hitchcock thought Trinity "perhaps the most satisfactory of all of [Burges's] works and the best example anywhere of Victorian Gothic collegiate architecture"; whilst Charles Handley-Read suggested the college was "is in some ways superior to Butterfield's Keble or Seddon's Aberystwyth."

=== The Tower House ===
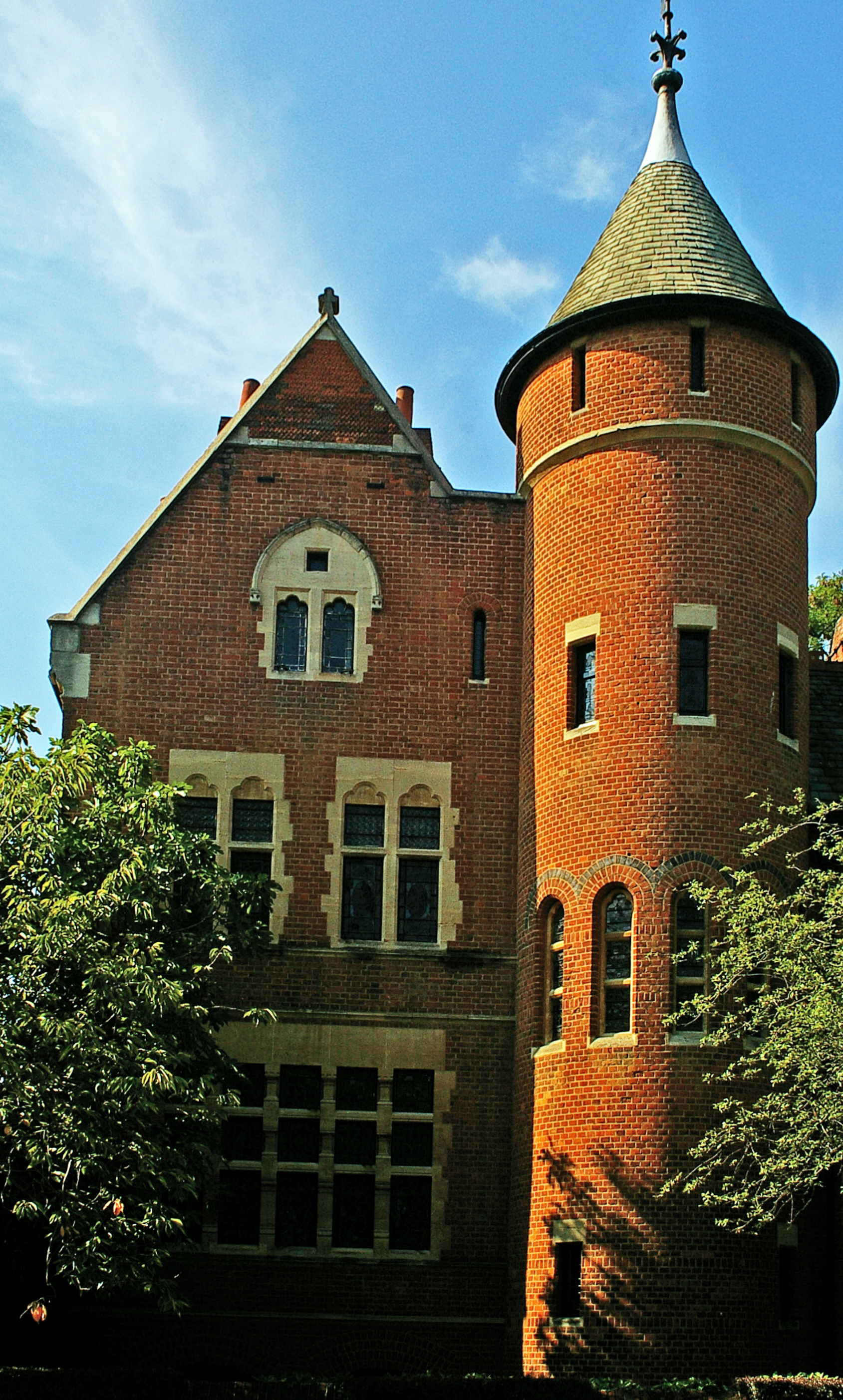
The Tower House: Burges's Palace of the Arts

From 1875, although he continued to work on the completion of projects already begun, Burges received no further major commissions. The construction, decoration and furnishing of his own home, The Tower House, Melbury Road, Kensington, occupied much of the last six years of his life. Burges designed the house in the style of a substantial thirteenth-century French townhouse.

Of red brick, and in an L plan, the exterior is plain. The house is not large, its floor-plan being little more than 50 feet square. But the approach Burges took to its construction was on a grand scale: the floor depths were sufficient to support rooms four or five times their size and the architect Richard Norman Shaw wrote of the concrete foundations as being suitable "for a fortress." This approach, combined with Burges's architectural skills and the minimum of exterior decoration, created a building that Crook describes as "simple and massive". As was usual with Burges, many elements of earlier designs were adapted and included, the street frontage from the McConnochie House, the cylindrical tower and conical roof from Castell Coch and the interiors from Cardiff Castle.

The most complete example of a medieval secular interior produced by the Gothic Revival, and the last.

— Crook writing on the Tower House.

The interior centres on the double-height entrance hall, Burges having avoided the error that he had made at the McConnochie House when he placed a vast central staircase in the middle of the building. At The Tower House, the stair is consigned to the conical tower. The ground floor contains a drawing room, dining room and library, while the first floor holds bedroom suites and a study. If Burges shunned exterior decoration at The Tower House, he more than compensated internally. Each room has a complex iconographic scheme of decoration: that of the hall is Time, in the drawing room, Love, in Burges's bedroom, the Sea. Massive fireplaces with elaborate overmantels were carved and installed, a castle in the Library and mermaids and sea-monsters of the deep in his own bedroom. His brother-in-law, Pullan, wrote that "Chaucer and Tennyson's poems were Mr Burges' chief text-books when engaged in designing these decorations."

In designing the medieval interior to the house, Burges also illustrated his skill as a jeweller, metalworker and designer, and produced some of his best works of furniture including the Zodiac settle, the Dog Cabinet and the Great Bookcase, the last of which Charles Handley-Read described as "occupying a unique position in the history of Victorian painted furniture." The fittings were as elaborate as the furniture: the tap for one of the guest washstands was in the form of a bronze bull from whose throat water poured into a sink inlaid with silver fish. Within the Tower House Burges placed some of his finest metalwork; the artist Henry Stacy Marks wrote "he could design a chalice as well as a cathedral ... His decanters, cups, jugs, forks and spoons were designed with an equal ability to that with which he would design a castle."

Upon completion, the Tower House was sensationally received. In a survey of the architecture of the past fifty years, published by The Builder in 1893, it was the only private town house to be included. In 1966, when the house was empty, Handley-Read described it as "unique in London, a precious anthology of designs by one of the most imaginative of all Victorian architects." Crook considers the house, the "synthesis of [Burges's] career and a glittering tribute to his achievement." The Tower House, which remains a private home, owned by Jimmy Page for many years, retains much of its internal structural decoration, but the furniture and contents that Burges designed for it have been dispersed.

== Metalwork, jewellery and ceramics ==
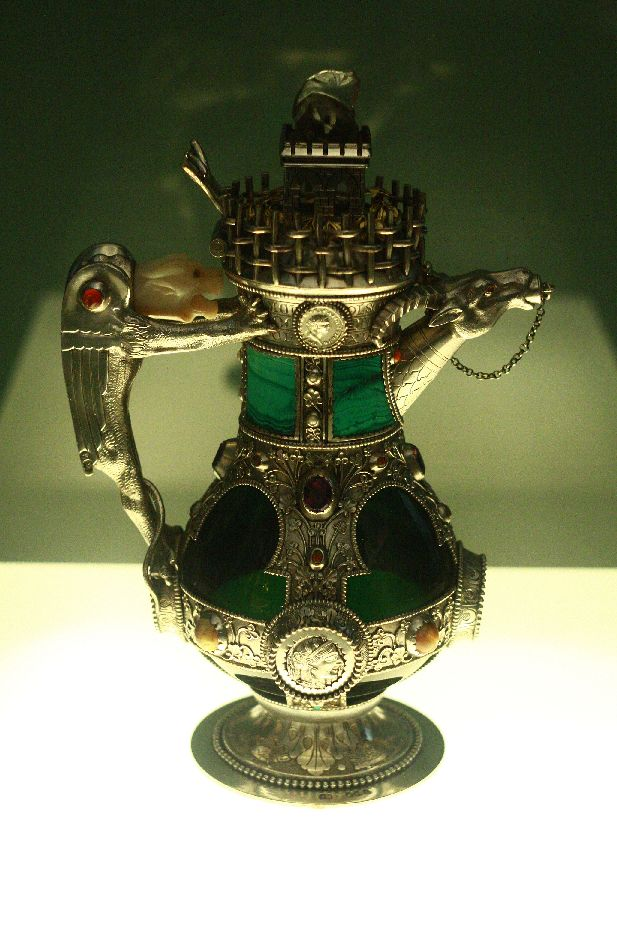
Green glass and silver decanter designed by Burges, commissioned in 1865 (Victoria and Albert Museum)

Burges was a notable designer of Gothic-inspired metalwork and jewellery, and he has been cited as "Pugin's successor in the Gothic revival style". Although Burges was foremost an architect, Edmund Gosse described his buildings as "more jewel than architecture", and Crook states that "Burges's genius as a designer is expressed to perfection in his jewellery and metalwork." He began with religious artifacts (candlesticks, chalices, pectoral crosses) as individual commissions or as part of the decorative scheme for buildings over which he had complete artistic control. Examples include the chalices for St Michael's Church, Brighton, the statue of the Angel which stands above St Fin Barre's and which was his personal gift to the cathedral, and the Dunedin Crozier. This item, carved in ivory and depicting St George slaying the dragon, was made for the first Bishop of Dunedin. Burges had an early, and close, connection to the Ecclesiological Society and in 1864 took on the role of superintendent of the Society's church plate scheme, from which position he imposed Barkentin as the Society's official manufacturer. In 1875 Burges published the design in a French magazine as a thirteenth century original, an example of his delight in tricks and jokes. Similarly inventive were his designs for fish plates for Lord Bute, in which a service of eighteen plates is decorated with punning illustrations, such as a skating skate, and a winged perch seated on the branch of a tree. He also undertook commissions for other patrons, including the Sneyd dessert service. On 3 April 1872, Burges produced a gothic-style brooch for the marriage of the Marquess of Bute to Lady Bute. In September 1873, he produced another brooch for the Marchioness, in the shape of a gothic G, a gold heraldic shield in enamel, encrusted with gems and pearls. He followed this with a necklace and earrings, an attempt to "design in Castellani's archeological style." Another example of the works that Burges created for Lady Bute as a present for her husband, was a silver cruet set, in the form of two medieval retainers carrying tiny barrels of salt and pepper; the answer to the question of "what to give a man who (could) afford everything."

His most notable metalworks were, however, created for himself, often with the proceeds of the winning of an architectural competition. Together, they display "a dazzling originality that surpasses any other silver designed earlier in the century". Examples include the Elephant Inkstand, which Crook considers "the very epitome of its creator's special genius", the pair of jewelled decanters paid for with the fees for the plans of the Crimea Memorial Church and for his series of lectures, Art Applied to Industry, and the Cat Cup, created by Barkentin in commemoration of the Law Courts competition, of which Crook writes: "Its technical virtuosity sets standards for the Arts and Crafts phase. But the overall conception, the range of materials, the ingenuity, the inventiveness, the sheer gusto of the design, is peculiarly, triumphantly Burges." Burges also designed more utilitarian articles which were nonetheless imbued with his love of allusion and punning, including silverware featuring mermaids, spiders and other creatures and a set of knives and forks for the Tower House, with the handles, carved by Nicholls, showing symbols of "meat and vegetables, veal, venision, onion, pea and so on." He was also a knowledgeable critic, referred to by a contemporary as "one of the best judges of armour in Europe." His large collection of armour, parts of which came from the famed collection of Sir Samuel Rush Meyrick, was bequeathed to the British Museum upon his death.

Only four examples of works in ceramic by Burges are known to exist. These are the tulip vases created for the corner corbels of the Summer Smoking Room at Cardiff Castle. Removed by the Fifth Marquess when the castle was given to the City of Cardiff in 1947, the vases were subsequently sold. They are now held by The Higgins Art Gallery & Museum, Bedford, the Victoria and Albert Museum, Amgueddfa Cymru – Museum Wales and the National Museum of Scotland.

The whereabouts of some of Burges's most important pieces are unknown, but discoveries are sometimes made: a brooch which he designed as a wedding present for his friend John Pollard Seddon was identified on the BBC television series Antiques Roadshow and subsequently sold at auction for £31,000 in August 2011. Another silver brooch studded with lapis lazuli, malachite and pink coral was identified 30 years after its purchase at an antique fair for £20, after the owner watched the same Antiques Roadshow on YouTube in 2024. It subsequently sold for £9,500.

== Stained glass ==
The impact created by all these glowing, coloured religious images is overwhelming and intoxicating. To enter St Fin Barre's Cathedral is an experience unparalleled in Ireland and rarely matched anywhere.

— Lawrence writing on the stained glass windows of St Fin Barre's Cathedral.

Burges played an important role in the renaissance of High Victorian stained glass. The provision of glass of appropriate colour and richness was central to many of his decorative themes, and he invested effort in working with the best cartoonists and manufacturers to achieve this. He also studied the history of glass production, writing in his second Art Applied to Industry lecture, "[a] use of antiquarian studies is to restore disused arts, and to get all the good we can out of them for our own improvement." In the catalogue to the exhibition of stained glass cartoons from Cardiff Castle, Sargent pays tribute to "his deep knowledge of the history and techniques of glass manufacture" and Lawrence considers him a pioneer who, by his "painstaking studies, re-established the principles of medieval decoration and used this to make [his] own bold and original statements." The results were outstanding; Lawrence wrote that Burges designed with "a vibrancy, an intensity and a brilliance which no other glass maker could match." He acknowledges Burges's debt to the manufacturers and craftsmen with whom he worked, in particular, Gualbert Saunders, whose "technique [gave] Burges's glass its most distinctive characteristic, namely the flesh colour. This is unique, had no precedents and has had no imitators." As well as at Saint Fin Barre's, Burges designed stained glass for all of his own significant churches, for reconstructions of medieval churches undertaken by others, and for his secular buildings. He undertook significant work at Waltham Abbey with Edward Burne-Jones, but much of his work there was destroyed in the Blitz. Crook writes, "At Waltham, Burges does not copy. He meets the Middle Ages as an equal.".

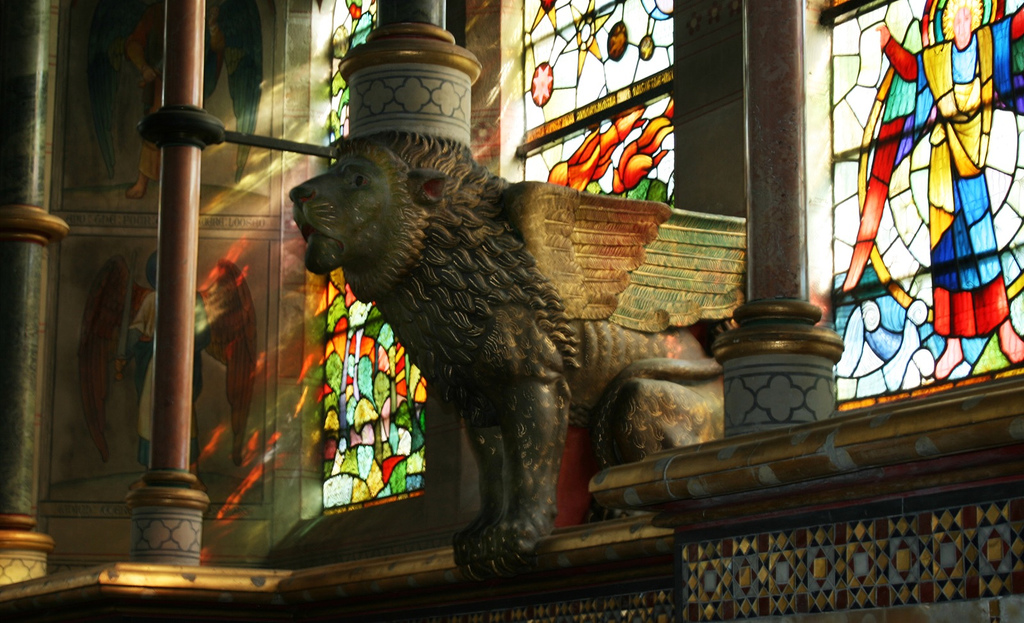
Stained glass and winged lion at St Mary's, Studley Royal

Windows by Burges continue to be discovered. In 2009, a stained glass window found in the vaults of Bath Abbey was confirmed as a design by Burges. The window, which was commissioned by Mallet and Company, featured on the Antiques Roadshow in early 2010 and is currently on display at the Bath Aqua Theatre of Glass. In March 2011, two glass panels designed by Burges were purchased for £125,000 by Cadw. The panels were part of a set of twenty Burges designed for the chapel at Castell Coch but were removed when the unfinished chapel was demolished. Ten of the panels were put on display at Cardiff Castle, and eight were used in the model of the chapel in the attic room of the Well Tower at Castell Coch; the two purchased by Cadw were considered lost until they failed to sell at auction in Salisbury in 2010. The Inspector of Ancient Monuments for Cadw, speaking after their purchase, said, "The panels show a variety of Welsh and British saints and key biblical figures and are of the highest quality Victorian stained glass. William Burges' work attracts enormous worldwide attention and the price reflects the artistic genius of the man and the rare quality of these glass panels."

Research has also led to being Burges properly credited with work previously attributed to others. In his 1958 volume on North Somerset and Bristol, Pevsner praises the "aesthetic quality" of the stained glass at the Church of St James, in Winscombe, but erroneously describes it as "one of the best examples of Morris glass in existence and quite unrecorded." In fact, the glass is by Burges.

== Furniture ==
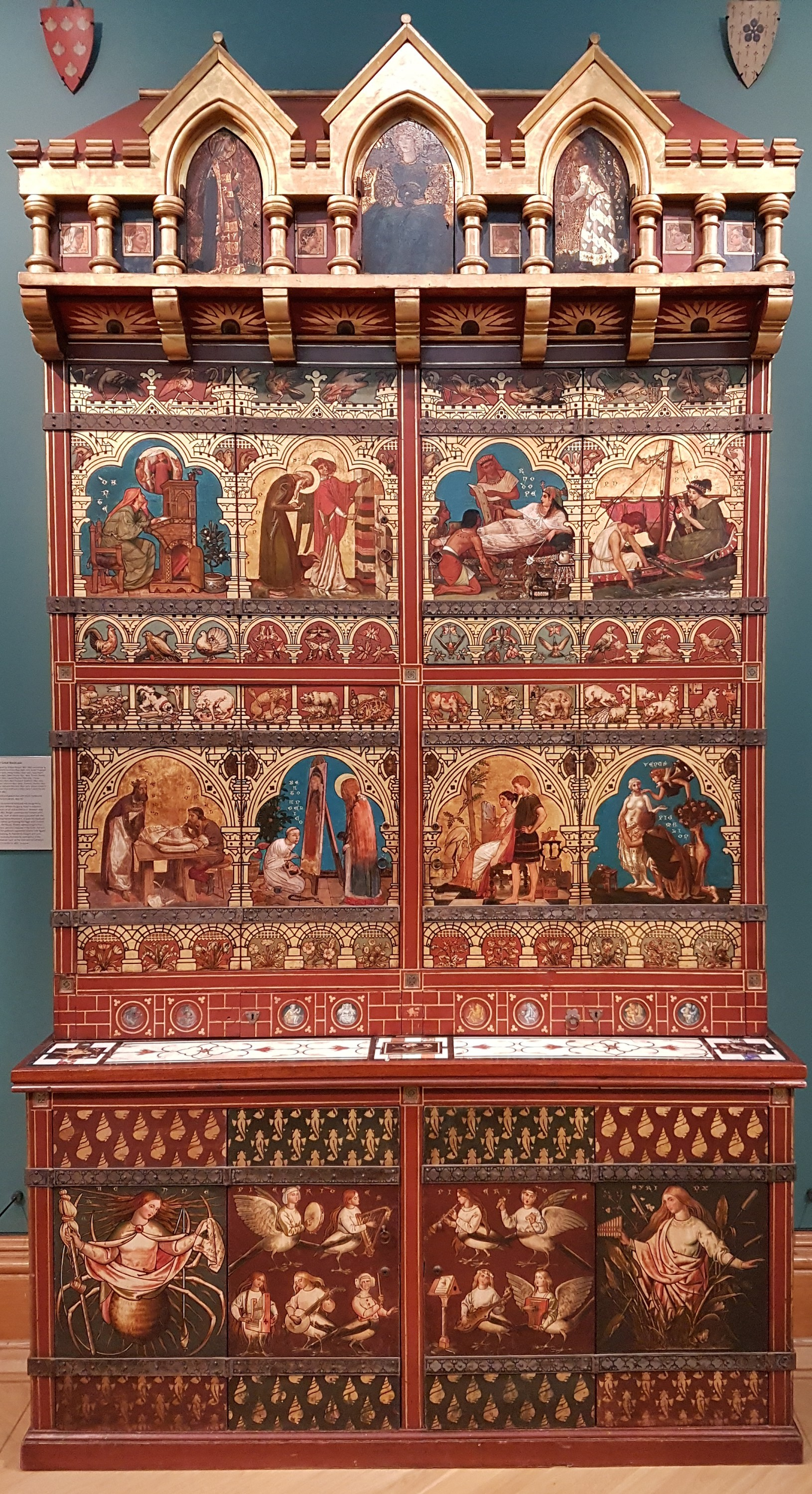
The Great Bookcase – "the most important example of Victorian painted furniture ever made"

Burges's furniture was, second to his buildings, his major contribution to the Victorian Gothic Revival; as Crook writes, "More than anyone, it was Burges, with his eye for detail and his lust for colour, who created the furniture appropriate to High Victorian Gothic." Enormous, elaborate and highly painted, Crook considers his "art furniture medieval in a way no other designer ever approached." The first detailed study of Burges's work in this area was by Charles Handley-Read in his article in The Burlington Magazine of November 1963, Notes on William Burges's Painted Furniture. Despised as much as his buildings in the reaction against Victorian taste that occurred in the twentieth century, his furniture came back into fashion in the latter part of that century and now commands very high prices.

Burges's furniture is characterised by its historical style, its mythological iconography, its vibrant painting and, often, by rather poor workmanship. The Great Bookcase collapsed in 1878 and required complete restoration. It was also expensive; Charlotte Ribeyrol, in her study William Burges's Great Bookcase & The Victorian Colour Revolution, published in 2023, reproduces the invoice for the bookcase showing that it cost Burges £240, half of which comprised the commissions paid to the artists who worked on the panels. The painting of his furniture was central to Burges's views on its purpose. Describing his ideal medieval chamber in the lecture on furniture, delivered as part of the Art Applied to Industry series, he writes of its fittings being "covered with paintings; it not only did its duty as furniture, but spoke and told a story." The designs were frequently collaborative, with artists from Burges's circle completing the painted panels that they mostly comprise. The contributors were often notable, Vost's sales catalogue for the Mirrored Sideboard suggesting that some of its panels were by Dante Gabriel Rossetti and Edward Burne-Jones.

His furniture is witty, inventive and erudite.

— Gordon Campbell writing on the furniture of Burges in The Grove Encyclopedia of Decorative Arts (2006).

Burges's furniture did not receive universal contemporary acclaim. In his major study of English domestic architecture, Das englische Haus, published some twenty years after Burges's death, Hermann Muthesius wrote of The Tower House, "Worst of all, perhaps, is the furniture. Some of it is in the earlier manner, some of it box-like and painted all over. This style had now become fashionable, though with what historical justification it is not easy to say".

Much of his early furniture, such as the Great Bookcase and the Zodiac settle, was designed for his offices at Buckingham Street and subsequently moved to the Tower House. The Great Bookcase was also part of Burges's contribution to the Medieval Court at the 1862 International Exhibition. (Note: The Great Bookcase was acquired at the 1933 sale of the contents of The Tower House by Kenneth Clark for the Ashmolean Museum. It was a far-sighted decision, Clark being well aware that the bookcase was "not acceptable to present taste" but recognising it as an "important document in the history of the Pre-Raphaelite movement". He paid £50.) Others, such as the Yatman Cabinet, were created as commissions. Later pieces, such as the Crocker Dressing Table and the Golden Bed and its accompanying Vita Nuova washstand, were specifically made for suites of rooms at the Tower House. The Narcissus washstand was originally made for Buckingham Street and subsequently moved to Burges's bedroom at the Tower House. John Betjeman, later Poet Laureate and a leading champion of the art and architecture of the Victorian Gothic Revival, was left the remaining lease on the Tower House, including some of the furniture, by E. R. B. Graham in 1961. He gave the washstand to the novelist Evelyn Waugh who made it the centrepiece of his 1957 novel, The Ordeal of Gilbert Pinfold, in which Pinfold is haunted by the stand.

Examples of Burges's painted furniture can be seen in major museums including the Victoria and Albert Museum, the Detroit Institute of Arts, the National Museum Wales and the Manchester Art Gallery. The Higgins Art Gallery & Museum, Bedford, holds a particularly fine collection, begun with a large number of purchases from the estate of Charles and Lavinia Handley-Read, including the Narcissus washstand, Burges's bed and the Crocker Dressing Table. The most recent acquisition by the Bedford Museum is the Zodiac settle (1869–70), painted by Henry Stacy Marks. The Museum paid £850,000 for the settle, comprising a £480,000 grant from the National Heritage Memorial Fund, £190,000 from the Trustees of the Cecil Higgins Art Gallery and £180,000 from the Art Fund after the British government imposed an export ban on the work.

== Personal life ==
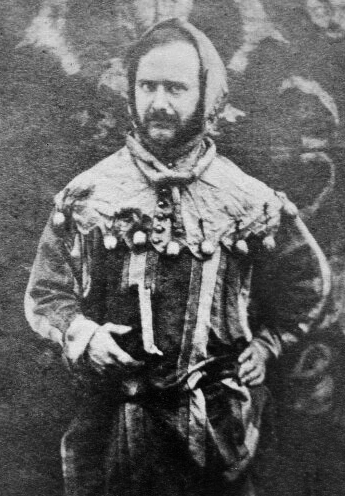
Burges as jester, circa 1860

Burges, who never married, was considered by his contemporaries to be eccentric, unpredictable, over-indulgent and flamboyant. He was also physically unprepossessing, described by the wife of his greatest patron as "ugly Burges". Short, fat, and so near-sighted that he once mistook a peacock for a man, Burges appears to have been sensitive about his appearance and very few images of him exist. The known portraits are: a painting of 1858 by Edward John Poynter on an internal panel of the Yatman Cabinet; a photograph from the 1860s, by an unknown author, showing Burges dressed as a court jester; a sketch of 1871 in The Graphic by Theodore Blake Wirgman; a pencil drawing in profile of 1875 by Edward William Godwin; three posed photographs from 1881 by Henry Van der Weyde and a posthumous caricature by Edward Burne-Jones.

Whatever his physical shortcomings, his personality, his conversation and his sense of humour were attractive and infectious, Crook commenting that "his range of friends [covered] the whole gamut of pre-Raphaelite London." Burges's childlike nature occasioned comment; Dante Gabriel Rossetti composing a limerick about him (see box). (Note: The "Jester" portrait, now held in the National Portrait Gallery, has Rossetti's limerick inscribed in pencil on the reverse.)

"There's a babyish party called Burges,
Who from childhood hardly emerges.
If you hadn't been told,
He's disgracefully old,
You would offer a bull's-eye to Burges."

— Dante Gabriel Rossetti's limerick on Burges's childish nature

Robert Kerr's novel of 1879, The Ambassador Extraordinary, involves an architect Georgius Oldhousen, whom Crook considers to be based on Burges; he is "not exactly young in years but is in an odd way youthful in appearance and in manners Georgius can never grow old ... His strong point is a disdain for Common Sense ... His vocation is Art ... [a] matter of Uncommon Sense." Burges was a clubbable man. Elected to the Institute of British Architects in 1860, in 1862 he was appointed to its Council and in 1863 was elected to the Foreign Architectural Book Society, the FABS, which comprised the RIBA elite and was limited to fifteen members. He became a member of the Athenaeum Club in 1874, was a member of the Arts Club, the Medieval Society, the Hogarth Club, and was elected to the Royal Academy in the year of his death. As with many of his friends Burges also joined The Artists Rifles.

Burges was a fanatical collector, particularly of drawings and metalwork. He was also a Freemason, a member of the same London lodge as his fellow architect William Eden Nesfield. Other pursuits included ratting and opium. The influence of drugs on his life and his architectural output has been debated; Crook speculating that it was in Constantinople, on his tour in the 1850s, that he first tasted opium and the Dictionary of Scottish Architects stating with certainty that his early death was brought about "at least partly as a result of his bachelor lifestyle of smoking both tobacco and opium." The architectural writer Simon Jenkins speculated as to why Sir John Heathcoat-Amory chose as his architect "an opium-addicted bachelor Gothicist who dressed in medieval costume." Burges's own diary of 1865 includes the reference, "Too much opium, did not go to Hayward's wedding", and Crook concludes that "it is hard to resist the conclusion that [opium] reinforced the dreamier elements in his artistic make-up".

== Death ==
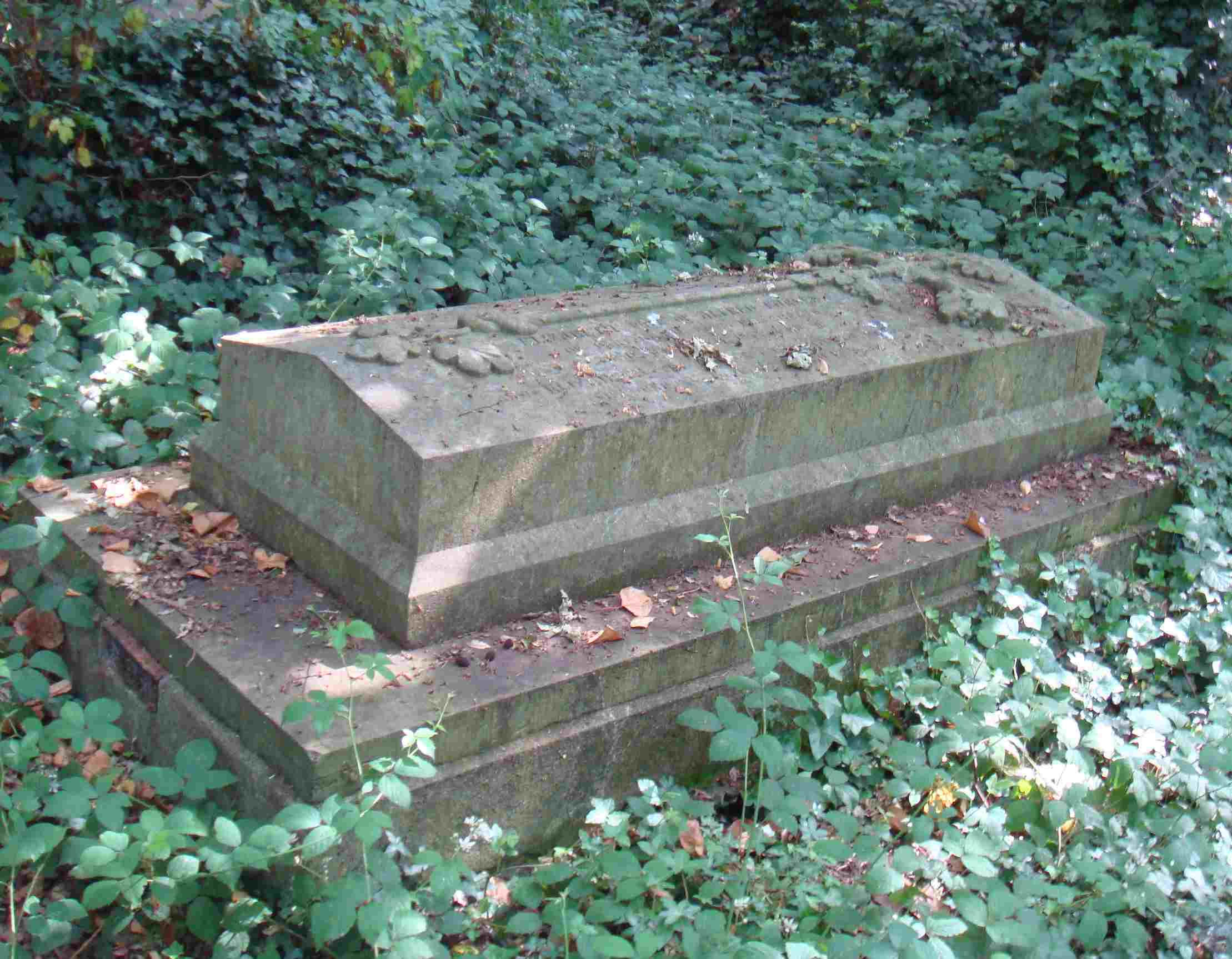
Burges's tomb at West Norwood Cemetery, London

Burges died, aged 53, in his Red Bed at the Tower House, at 11.45 p.m. on Wednesday 20 April 1881. While on a tour of works at Cardiff, he caught a chill and returned to London, half-paralysed, where he lay dying for some three weeks. Among his last visitors were Oscar Wilde and James Whistler. He was buried in the tomb he designed for his mother at West Norwood, London. (Note: Burges's tomb is a Grade II* listed structure.) On his death, John Starling Chapple, Burges's office manager and close associate for more than twenty years, wrote "a constant relationship ... with one of the brightest ornaments of the profession has rendered the parting most severe. Thank God his work will live and ... be the admiration of future students. I have hardly got to realize my lonely position yet. He was almost all the world to me." Lady Bute, wife of his greatest patron, wrote, "Dear Burges, ugly Burges, who designed such lovely things – what a duck."

"[He was] the most dazzling exponent of the High Victorian Dream. Pugin conceived that dream; Rossetti and Burne-Jones painted it; Tennyson sang its glories; Ruskin and Morris formulated its philosophy; but only Burges built it."

— Crook writing about Burges's role in the High Victorian Dream.

In Saint Fin Barre's, together with memorials to his mother and sister, there is a memorial plaque to Burges, designed by him, and erected by his father. It shows the King of Heaven presiding over the four apostles, who hold open the Word of God. Under the inscription "Architect of this cathedral" is a simple shield and a small, worn, plaque with a mosaic surround, bearing Burges's entwined initials and name. Legal complications obstructed Burges's wish to be buried in the cathedral he had built. Burges's own words on Saint Fin Barre's, in his letter of January 1877 to the Bishop of Cork, sum up his career, "Fifty years hence, the whole affair will be on its trial and, the elements of time and cost being forgotten, the result only will be looked at. The great questions will then be, first, is this work beautiful and, secondly, have those to whom it was entrusted, done it with all their heart and all their ability."

== Legacy and influence ==
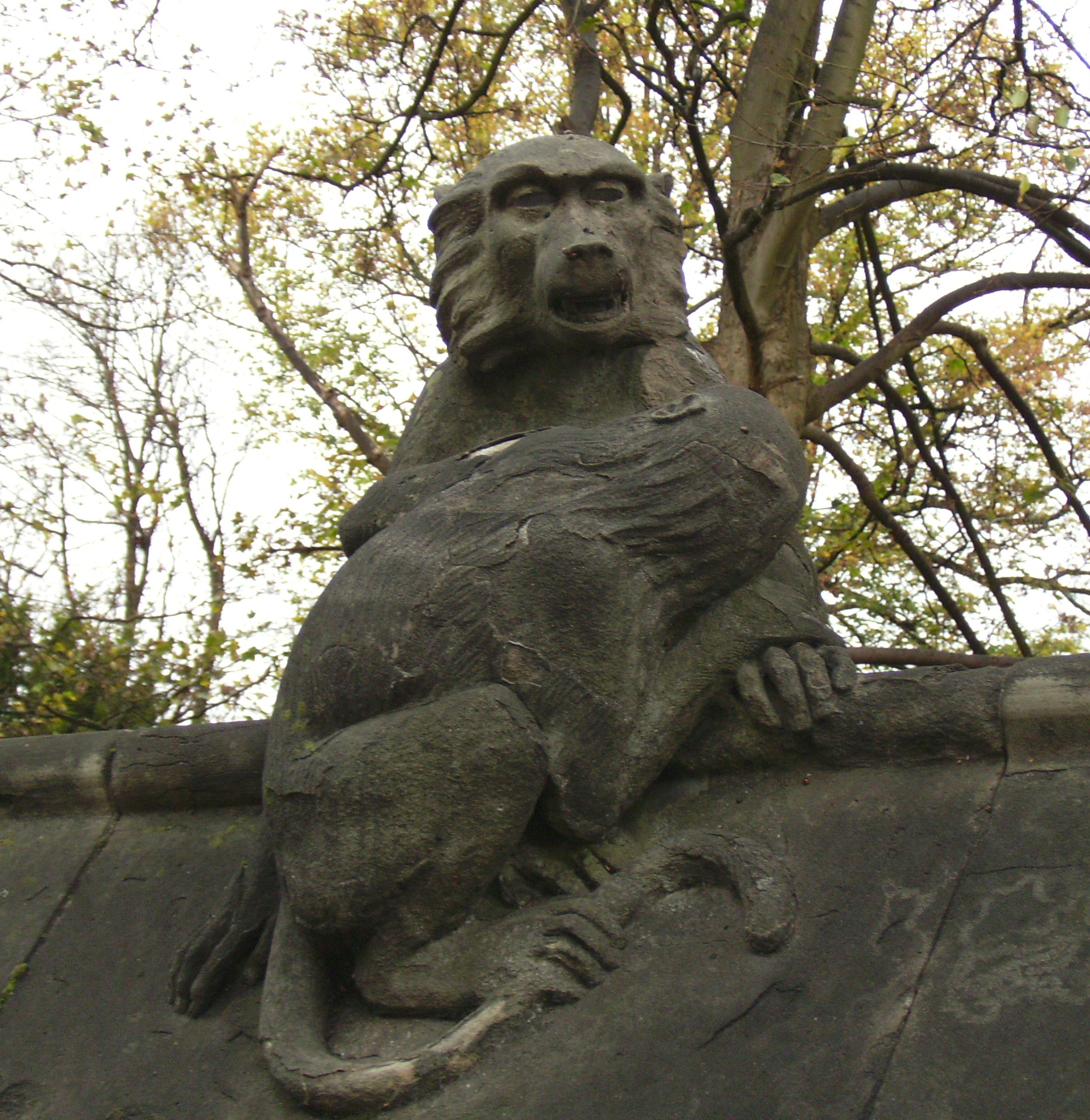
Animal Wall Cardiff Castle – The Monkeys: One of nine original sculptures carved in 1891 by Thomas Nicholls to designs by Burges

On Burges's death in 1881, his contemporary, the architect Edward William Godwin, said of him that "no one of the century of this country or any other that I know of, ever possessed that artistic rule over the kingdom of nature in a measure at all comparable with that which he shared in common with the creator of the Sphinx and the designer of Chartres." But the Gothic Revival he championed with such force was in decline. Within twenty years his style was considered hopelessly outdated and owners of his works sought to eradicate all traces of his efforts. From the 1890s to the later twentieth century, Victorian art was under constant assault, critics writing of "the nineteenth century architectural tragedy", ridiculing "the uncompromising ugliness" of the era's buildings and attacking the "sadistic hatred of beauty" of its architects. Of Burges, they wrote almost nothing. His buildings were disregarded or altered, his jewellery and stained glass were lost or ignored, and his furniture was given away. The architectural historian Megan Aldrich writes, "He founded no school ... had few adherents outside the circle of his practice ... and trained no further generation of designers." In comparison with more prolific contemporaries, he completed relatively few works and lost many architectural competitions. Burges's collaborator, the artist Nathaniel Westlake, lamented "competitions are seldom given to the best man – look at the number poor Burges won, or should have won, and I think he executed only one." Burges occasionally acted as a judge in architectural competitions and Eastlake also commented on Burges's failure to win them; "in one case only has he traversed this always arduous road to fame with anything like substantial success."

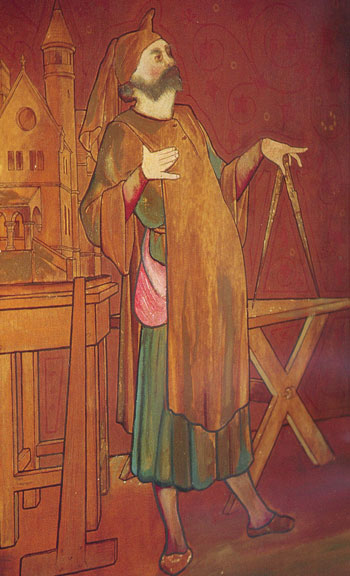
Burges as architect, by Frederick Weekes

Almost his sole champion in the years after his death was his brother-in-law, Richard Popplewell Pullan. Primarily an illustrator, as well as a scholar and archaeologist, Pullan trained with Alfred Waterhouse in Manchester, before joining Burges's office in the 1850s. In 1859, he married Burges's sister. Following Burges's death in 1881, Pullan lived at The Tower House and published collections of Burges's designs, including Architectural Designs of William Burges (1883) and The House of William Burges (1886). In his preface to Architectural Designs Pullan expressed the hope that illustrated volumes of his brother-in-law's work "would be warmly welcomed and thoroughly appreciated, not only by his professional brethern, but by all men of educated taste in Europe and America." This hope was not to be fulfilled for a hundred years but Burges's work did continue to attract followers in Japan. Josiah Conder studied under him, and, through Conder's influence, the notable Japanese architect Tatsuno Kingo was articled to Burges in the year before the latter's death. Burges also received brief, but largely favourable, attention in Muthesius's Das englische Haus, where Muthesius described him as "the most talented Gothicist of his day".

From the later twentieth century to the present a renaissance has occurred in the study of Victorian art, architecture and design and Crook contends that Burges's place at the centre of that world, as "a wide-ranging scholar, an intrepid traveller, a coruscating lecturer, a brilliant decorative designer and an architect of genius," is again appreciated. Crook writes further that, in a career of only some twenty years, he became "the most brilliant architect-designer of his generation," and, beyond architecture, his achievements in metalwork, jewellery, furniture and stained glass place him as Pugin's only "rival [.] as the greatest art-architect of the Gothic Revival."

== Architectural scholarship ==
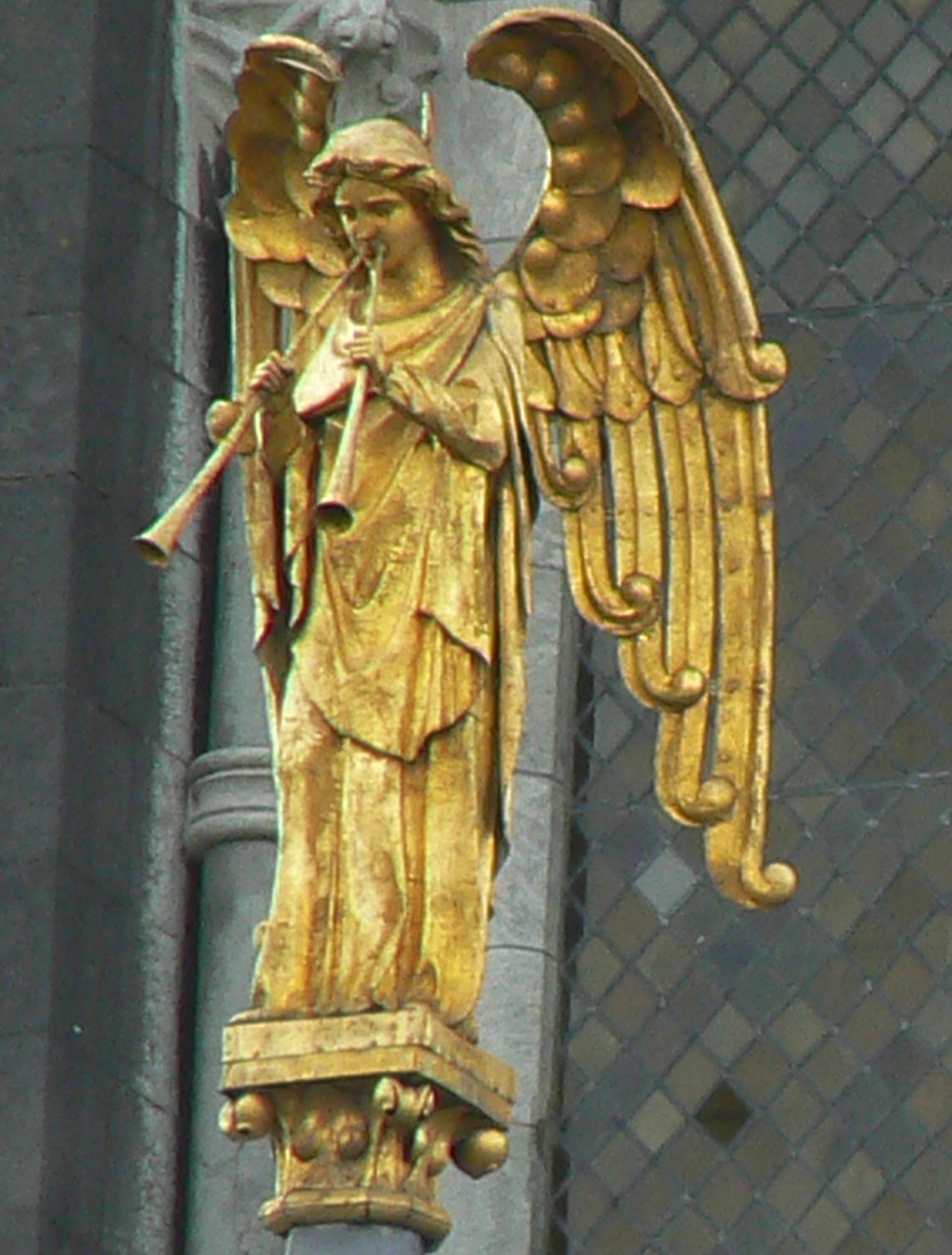
The Resurrection Angel – Burges's personal gift to Saint Fin Barre's Cathedral, Cork, in which he wished to be buried

Burges's limited output, and the general unpopularity of his work for much of the century following his death, meant that he was little studied. In a seventy-one page guide to Cardiff Castle, published in 1923, he is referenced only three times, and on each occasion his name is misspelt as "Burgess". Pevsner's 1951 volume on the exhibits at The Great Exhibition, High Victorian Design, makes no mention of him, despite his significant contributions to the Medieval Court. The 1950s saw the small beginnings of a reaction against the condemnation of all that the Victorian architects, including Burges, had produced. John Steegman's pioneering study, Consort of Taste (re-issued in 1970 as Victorian Taste, with a foreword by Pevsner), was published in 1950 and began a slow turn in the tide of opinion "towards a more serious and sympathetic assessment." The exhibition of Victorian and Edwardian Decorative Arts held at the Victoria and Albert Museum in 1952 included five pieces of his furniture and four examples of his metalwork. This was followed by the foundation of the Victorian Society in 1958. Victorian Architecture, a collection of essays edited by Peter Ferriday and published in 1963, contained an article on him by Charles Handley-Read, perhaps the first serious scholar of Burges. Handley-Read took a measured view of Burges's work writing that, "as a designer, he (was) apt to be aggressive rather than charming", but he was in no doubt of Burges's significance, writing of his best works as "indispensable examples of 'Victorian Conservanda'." (Note: As late as the 1970s, Burges's work could provoke strong negative reactions. J. Mordaunt Crook recorded James Lees-Milne's reaction to a Royal Academy exhibition of the Handley-Read collection, which contained many important pieces by Burges; "The hideousness of the furniture and ornaments [are] beyond belief...no wonder both Handley-Reads committed suicide...their house was apparently stuffed with these ghastly things.")

The last thirty years, however, have seen a significant revival of interest. Burges's rehabilitation can be dated to 1981, the centenary of his death, when a major exhibition on his life and works was held, firstly at the National Museum Cardiff, until October 1981, and then at the Victoria and Albert Museum, London, from November 1981 to January 1982. The catalogue to that exhibition, entitled The Strange Genius of William Burges, was edited by J. Mordaunt Crook. A much smaller exhibition of his work was also held at the Crawford Municipal Art Gallery in Cork. In the same year, the only full study of Burges, Crook's William Burges and the High Victorian Dream, was published. In the dedication to that volume, "In Mem. C.H.-R", Crook acknowledges his debt to Charles Handley-Read, whose notes on Burges Crook inherited following Handley-Read's suicide. A revised edition was published in February 2013. Other sources include articles on Cardiff Castle and Castle Coch in Mark Girouard's The Victorian Country House. The Buildings of England, The Buildings of Wales, The Buildings of Scotland and The Buildings of Ireland series provide comprehensive coverage of Burges's works by county, although in the last instance it is not yet complete. The former curator of Cardiff Castle, Matthew Williams, has also written a number of book and articles on Burges and the third Marquess of Bute. The Cathedral of Saint Fin Barre at Cork, by David Lawrence and Ann Wilson, covers Burges's work in Ireland.

== List of works ==
The chronological list of Burges's major buildings is believed to be complete, although some minor works, or minimal additions to pre-existing structures, have not been included. The list of furniture and other works is selective. No listing is given of his extensive creations of jewellery, metalwork and stained glass. Crook has a comprehensive, chronological, appendix of Burges's work with indications as to whether the work is still in situ, was never executed, has been removed elsewhere, has been demolished or where the present location is unknown. (Note: Burges's obituary, published in the Transactions of the Royal Institute of British Architects 1881–82, credits him within the design of Ripon Grammar School. However, modern scholarship attributes the 19th-century rebuilding to George Corson.)

=== Chronology of buildings ===
- Salisbury Cathedral, Wiltshire 1855–59 – Chapter House restoration
- Treverbyn Vean, Cornwall, 1858–62 – decoration and fittings for Col. C L Somers Cocks. Since altered
- Gayhurst House, Buckinghamshire, 1858–65 – alterations for Lord Carrington
- Bewholme Vicarage, East Riding of Yorkshire, 1859 – commission for an unknown client
- Maison Dieu, Dover and Town Hall, 1859–75 – alterations and extensions
- Waltham Abbey, 1859–77 – restoration
- Elizabeth Almshouses and Chapel, Worthing, Sussex 1860 – for his father, Alfred, who founded the charity
- The Old School House, Winchfield, Hampshire, 1860–61
- All Saints Church, Fleet, Hampshire, 1860–62
- Saint Fin Barre's Cathedral, Cork, Ireland, 1863–1904
- Yorke Almshouses, Gloucestershire, 1863–64
- Church of St James, Winscombe, Somerset, 1863–64, chancel restoration and stained glass for the Rev. J. A. Yatman
- Church of St Helen, Kilnsea, East Riding of Yorkshire, 1864–65, partly paid for by Burges's father, Alfred
- Church of St Mary, Forthampton, Gloucestershire, 1864–66, chancel restoration and fittings for the Yorke family
- St Anne's Court, Soho, 1864–66 – model lodgings for Lachlan Mackintosh Rate. Since demolished.
- Church of St Nicholas, Charlwood, Surrey, 1864–67
- Worcester College, Oxford, 1864–69 – redecoration of the Chapel and 1873–79 – redecoration of the Hall. The latter is substantially altered with little of Burges's work remaining, the former complete.
- Oakwood Hall, Bingley, Yorkshire, 1864–65 – internal decoration, in collaboration with Edward Burne-Jones. Since altered
- Church of St Peter, Carrigrohane, County Cork, Ireland 1865 – extensions for the Reverend Robert Gregg
- Skilbeck's Warehouse, London, 1865–66 – remodelling of a drysalter's warehouse on Upper Thames Street. Since demolished
- Holy Trinity Church Templebreedy, Crosshaven, County Cork, Ireland, 1866–68
- Church of St Margaret of Antioch, Darenth, Kent, 1866–68 – restoration for the Reverend R P Coates
- Cardiff Castle, Glamorgan, 1866–1928 – reconstruction and restoration for Lord Bute
- St Michael and All Angels Church, Lowfield Heath, Sussex, 1867–68
- Knightshayes Court, Tiverton, Devon, 1867–74
- St Michael's Church, Brighton, Sussex, 1868 – designs for extensions, 1892–99 – designs executed
- Church of St John the Baptist, Outwood, Surrey, 1869
- Milton Court, Dorking, Surrey, 1869–80 – refurbishment for Lachlan Mackintosh Rate
- Chevithorne Vicarage, Chevithorne, Devon, 1870–71 – for Sir John Heathcoat-Amory
- Church of Christ the Consoler at Skelton-on-Ure, Yorkshire, 1870–76 – memorial church for Lady Mary Vyner
- St Mary's, Studley Royal, near Fountains Abbey, Yorkshire, 1870–78 – memorial church and associated Choristers' House for Lord Ripon
- Park House, Cardiff, 1871–80 – for Lord Bute's chief engineer, James McConnochie and previously known as McConnochie House
- Speech Room, Harrow School, 1871–77
- Church of All Saints, Murston, Kent, 1872–73
- St Faith's, Stoke Newington, London, 1872–73 – badly damaged by a flying bomb in 1944 and since demolished
- Castell Coch, Glamorgan, 1872–91 – recreation for Lord Bute
- The Choristers House, St Mary's, Studley Royal, Yorkshire, 1873 – estate cottage
- Mount Stuart House Isle of Bute, oratory, 1873–75 – for Lord Bute
- Trinity College, Hartford, Connecticut, United States, 1873–82 – Seabury, Northam and Jarvis Halls, collectively the Long Walk
- The Tower House, Melbury Road, Kensington, 1875–81 – for himself
- Church of St John, Cumnock, 1878–80 – completed after Burges's death
- Anglican Church, Mariánské Lázně, Czech Republic, 1879 – memorial church for Mrs Anna Scott.

=== Unexecuted designs ===
- Lille Cathedral, 1856
- St Francis Xavier's Cathedral, Adelaide, 1856
- Colombo Cathedral, Ceylon
- Crimea Memorial Church, 1856–61
- St John's Cathedral, Brisbane, 1859
- Florence Cathedral, West front, 1862
- Sir Jamsetjee Jeejebhoy School of Art, Bombay 1865–66
- Royal Courts of Justice, London, 1866–67
- St Paul's Cathedral, London, 1870–77 – interior decoration
- Church of the Holy Trinity, Stratford-upon-Avon, 1870 & 1872
- Rothesay Castle, Isle of Bute, 1872 – mostly unexecuted scheme for a full reconstruction
- St Mary's Cathedral, Edinburgh (Episcopal), Edinburgh, 1873
- Lahore Cathedral, 1878
- Truro Cathedral, 1878

=== Major pieces of furniture with locations ===
- The Yatman cabinet, 1858 – the Victoria and Albert Museum
- St. Bacchus sideboard, 1858 – Detroit Institute of Arts
- The Architecture cabinet, 1859 – National Museum Wales
- The Mirrored buffet, 1859 – present location unknown
- Sideboard and wine cabinet, 1859 – the Art Institute of Chicago
- Wines and Beers sideboard, 1859 – Victoria and Albert Museum
- The Great Bookcase, 1859–62 – Ashmolean Museum
- Font at Church of St Peter, Draycott, Somerset, 1861 – controversially offered up for sale by Bath & Wells in 2007, but retained on appeal
- Taylor bookcase, 1862 – The Higgins Art Gallery & Museum, Bedford
- Narcissus washstand, 1865 – The Higgins Art Gallery & Museum, Bedford
- The Red Bed, 1865 – The Higgins Art Gallery & Museum, Bedford
- Crocker dressing table, 1867 – The Higgins Art Gallery & Museum, Bedford,
- The Clock cabinet, 1867 – Manchester City Art Gallery
- Zodiac settle, 1869–70 – The Higgins Art Gallery & Museum, Bedford, purchased by the museum in February 2011
- Nursery wardrobe, 1875 – The Higgins Art Gallery & Museum, Bedford
- The 'Golden' bed, 1879 – Knightshayes Court, Devon on loan from the Victoria and Albert Museum
- Philosophy cabinet, 1878–79 – designed for the guest bedroom at The Tower House, now in a private collection

== Sources ==
- Aldrich, Megan (2005). Gothic Revival. Phaidon Press. ISBN 978-0-7148-3631-7.
- Aldrich, Megan Brewster; Atterbury, Paul (1995). A.W.N. Pugin: Master of Gothic Revival. Yale University Press. ISBN 978-0-300-06656-2.
- Andrews, Robert (2011). DK Eyewitness Top 10 Travel Guide: Devon & Cornwall. Dorling Kindersley Ltd. ISBN 978-1-4053-7241-1.
- Banham, Joanna; Harris, Jennifer (1984). William Morris and the Middle Ages : a collection of essays, together with a catalogue of works, exhibited at the Whitworth art gallery, 28 September-8 December 1984. Manchester: Manchester University Press. ISBN 978-0-7190-1721-6.
- Betjeman, Sir John; Surman, Richard (2011). Betjeman's Best British Churches. HarperCollins UK. ISBN 978-0-007-41688-2.
- Bradley, Simon; Pevsner, Nikolaus (2002). London 1: The City of London. The Buildings of England. Yale University Press. ISBN 978-0-300-09624-8.
- Brodie, Antonia; Felstead, Alison; Franklin, Jonathan; Pinfield, Leslie; Oldfield, Jane (2001). Directory of British Architects: 1834–1914. Vol. 1: A–K. New York and London: Continuum. ISBN 0-8264-4963-8. OCLC 1042847872.
- Buckingham, James Silk; Sterling, John; Maurice, Frederick Denison (1897). The Athenæum: A Journal of Literature, Science, the Fine Arts, Music, and the Drama. J. Francis. OCLC 4856498.
- Bullen, Michael; Crook, John; Hubbuck, Rodney; Pevsner, Nikolaus (2010). The Buildings of England: Hampshire:Winchester and the North. Yale University Press. ISBN 978-0-300-12084-4.
- Burges, William (2009). Art Applied to Industry: A series of Lectures. Bibliobazaar. ISBN 978-1-115-19362-7.
- Burges, William (2012) [1878]. Designs for Fish Plates to be executed for Lord Bute. Thomas Heneage Art Books (re-print).
- Burton, Lawrence (1978). A choice over our heads: a guide to architecture and design since 1830. Talisman Books. ISBN 978-0-905-98306-6.
- Campbell, Gordon (2006). The Grove Encyclopedia of Decorative Arts. Oxford: Oxford University Press. ISBN 978-0-19-518948-3.
- Carey, Maurice (1981). Got Cork – an exhibition on the occasion of the centenary of William Burges.
- Cherry, Bridget; Pevsner, Nikolaus (2002) [1991]. London 3: North West. Penguin Books. ISBN 978-0-14-071048-9.
- Cherry, Bridget; Pevsner, Nikolaus (2004). Devon. The Buildings of England. Yale University Press. ISBN 978-0-300-09596-8.
- Clark, Kenneth (1983). The Gothic Revival: An Essay in the History of Taste. John Murray. ISBN 978-0-7195-3102-6.
- Clifford, Helen (2004). A Treasured Inheritance: 600 Years of Oxford College Silver. Ashmolean Museum. ISBN 978-1-85444-195-9.
- Close, Rob; Riches, Anne (2012). Ayrshire and Arran. The Buildings of Scotland. Yale University Press. ISBN 978-0-300-14170-2.
- Cooper, Jeremy (1998). Victorian and Edwardian decor: from the gothic revival to art nouveau. Abbeville Press. ISBN 978-0-7892-0446-2.
- Crinson, Mark (1996). Empire Building: Orientalism and Victorian Architecture. Psychology Press. ISBN 978-0-415-13940-3.
- Crook, J. Mordaunt (1980a). William Burges and the Completion of St. Paul's. Oxford University Press. OCLC 28546641.
- Crook, J. Mordaunt (1981a). William Burges and the High Victorian Dream. John Murray. ISBN 978-0-7195-3822-3.
- Crook, J. Mordaunt (1981b). The Strange Genius of William Burges. The National Museum of Wales. ISBN 978-0-7200-0259-1.
- Crook, J. Mordaunt (2003). The Architect's Secret: Victorian Critics and the Image of Gravity. John Murray. ISBN 0-7195-6057-8.
- Crook, J. Mordaunt (1971). Patron Extraordinary: John, 3rd Marquis of Bute, Lecture at the Seventh Conference of the Victorian Society: Victorian South Wales – Architecture, Industry and Society. The Victorian Society. ISBN 9780901657022.
- Crook, J. Mordaunt (October 1980b). "A Multicoloured Fantasy: Lost Treasures of William Burges". Country Life.
- Crook, J. Mordaunt (November 2012). "Billy Burges Revisited". The Victorian (41): 5–6.
- Crook, J.Mordaunt; Lennox-Boyd, C. (1984). Axel Haig and the Victorian Vision of the Middle Ages. George Allen and Unwin. ISBN 978-0-04-720029-8.
- Curl, James Stevens (1995). Book of Victorian churches. B.T. Batsford. ISBN 978-0-7134-7490-9.
- Dakers, Caroline (1999). The Holland Park circle: artists and Victorian society. Yale University Press. ISBN 978-0-300-08164-0.
- Davenport, Fionn (2010). Ireland. Lonely Planet. ISBN 978-1-741-79214-0.
- Davids, Roy (1998). Manuscripts annotated books literary and historical portraits artefacts and works of art. Roy Davids LTD. OCLC 228660547.
- Dixon, Roger; Muthesius, Stefan (1993). Victorian Architecture. Thames and Hudson. ISBN 978-0-19-520048-5.
- Eastlake, Charles Locke (2012). A History of the Gothic Revival. Cambridge: Cambridge University Press. ISBN 978-1-108-05191-0.
- Eastlake, Lady Elizabeth Rigby; Sheldon, Julie (2009). The letters of Elizabeth Rigby, Lady Eastlake. Liverpool University Press. ISBN 978-1-846-31194-9.
- Else, David (2012). England. Lonely Planet. ISBN 978-1-741-04567-3.
- Fawcett, Jane (2012). Historic Floors. CRC Press. ISBN 978-1-136-39856-8.
- Fawcett, Jane, ed. (1976). The Future of the Past: Attitudes to conservation 1174–1974. London: Thames and Hudson. ISBN 978-0-500-23231-6.
- Ferriday, Peter (1963). Victorian Architecture. Jonathan Cape. OCLC 270335.
- Finn, Dallas (1995). Meiji Revisited: The Sites of Victorian Japan. Weatherhill. ISBN 978-0-834-80288-9.
- Floud, Peter (1952). Catalogue of an Exhibition of Victorian and Edwardian Decorative Art. Her Majesty's Stationery Office. OCLC 589822.
- Foyle, Andrew; Pevsner, Nikolaus (2011). Somerset:North and Bristol. The Buildings of England. Yale University Press. ISBN 978-0-300-12658-7.
- Gere, Charlotte (17 April 1972). Victorian Jewellery Design. Kimber. ISBN 9780718302320.
- Gillingham, Susan (2009). Encountering Burges: Reflections on the Art and Architecture of the Chapel at Worcester College, Oxford. Third Millennium Publishing Limited. ISBN 978-1-906507-47-3.
- Girouard, Mark (1995). The Victorian Country House. Yale University Press. ISBN 978-0-300-02390-9.
- Godwin, Edward William (2005). Kinchin, Juliet; Stirton, Paul (eds.). Is Mr Ruskin Living Too Long? – Selected Writings of E. W. Godwin. Oxford: White Cockade Publishing. ISBN 978-18734-8712-9. OCLC 470551179.
- Graham, Clare (2003). Ordering law: the architectural and social history of the English law court to 1914. Ashgate Publishing, Ltd. ISBN 978-0-7546-0787-8.
- Grant, John (1923). Cardiff Castle: Its History and Architecture. William Lewis (Publishers) Ltd. OCLC 34158534.
- Hall, Michael (2009). The Victorian Country House from the Archives of Country Life. Aurum Press. ISBN 978-1-84513-457-0.
- Hallett, Anna (2004). Almshouses. Osprey. ISBN 978-0-747-80583-0. OCLC 62130073.
- Handley-Read, Charles (November 1963). "Notes on William Burges's Painted Furniture". The Burlington Magazine.
- Handley-Read, Charles (March 1966). "Aladdin's Palace in Kensington: William Burges's Tower House". Country Life.
- Hannah, Rosemary (2012). The Grand Designer: Third Marquess of Bute. Birlinn. ISBN 978-1-78027-027-2.
- Harper, Roger H. (1983). Victorian Architectural Competitions: An Index to British and Irish Architectural Competitions in The Builder, 1843–1900. Mansell Publishing Limited. ISBN 0-7201-1685-6.
- Harrison, Martin; Waters, Bill (1989). Burne-Jones. Barrie & Jenkins. ISBN 978-0-7126-2193-9.
- Hayward, John (1972). English Cabinets. London: Victoria and Albert Museum. OCLC 924544891.
- Hilling, John (1975). Plans & Prospects: Architecture in Wales 1780-1914. Cardiff: Welsh Arts Council. OCLC 699239953.
- Hitchcock, Henry-Russell (1968) [1958]. Architecture: Nineteenth and Twentieth Centuries. Pelican History of Art. London: Penguin Books. OCLC 851173836.
- Jenkins, Simon (2003). England's Thousand Best Houses. Allen Lane. ISBN 978-0-14-103929-9.
- Jervis, Simon (1972). Victorian and Edwardian Decorative Art: The Handley-Read Collection. Royal Academy of Arts. OCLC 2405402.
- Johansens (2000). Historic Houses, Castles and Gardens – Great Britain and Ireland. Johansens. p. 251. ISBN 978-1-86017-716-3.
- Johnson, Diana L. (1979). Fantastic Illustration and Design in Britain, 1850–1930. Rhode Island School of Design. ISBN 9780686250913.
- Jones, Nigel R. (2005). Architecture of England, Scotland, and Wales. Greenwood Publishing Group. ISBN 978-0-313-31850-4.
- Karlin, Elyse Zorn (1993). Jewelry and Metalwork in the Arts and Crafts Tradition. Schiffer Pub. ISBN 9780887404535.
- Lawrence, David; Wilson, Ann (2006). The Cathedral of Saint Fin Barre at Cork: William Burges in Ireland. Four Courts Press. ISBN 978-1-84682-023-6.
- Leach, Peter; Pevsner, Nikolaus (2009). Yorkshire West Riding: Leeds, Bradford and the North. The Buildings of England. Yale University Press. ISBN 978-0-300-12665-5.
- Locke, Tim (2011). Slow South Downs & Sussex Coast: Local, Characterful Guides to Britain's Special Places. Bradt Travel Guides. ISBN 978-1-84162-343-6.
- Lowe, Rosalind (2003). Sir Samuel Meyrick and Goodrich Court. Woonton, Almeley: Logaston Press. ISBN 9781873827888. OCLC 55235711.
- Madan, Falconer (1921). The Daniel Press : memorials of C.H.O. Daniel with a bibliography of the Press, 1845–1919. Oxford: Daniel.
- McLees, David (2005). Castell Coch. CADW. ISBN 978-1-85760-210-4.
- Morris, Jan (1986). Architecture of the British Empire. Vendome Press. ISBN 978-0-865-65062-6.
- Muthesius, H. (1979) [1904]. The English House (Single volume ed.). Frogmore: Granada Publishing. ISBN 0-258-97101-0.
- Newman, John (2001). Glamorgan. The Buildings of Wales. Penguin. ISBN 978-0-14-071056-4.
- Osband, Linda (2003). Victorian Gothic House Style: An Architectural and Interior Design Source Book for Home Owners. David & Charles. ISBN 978-0-7153-1438-8.
- Pevsner, Nikolaus (1958). North Somerset and Bristol. The Buildings of England. Penguin. ISBN 9780140710137. OCLC 8991318.
- Pevsner, Nikolaus; Lloyd, David (1967). Hampshire and the Isle of Wight. Penguin. ISBN 978-0-14-071032-8.
- Pevsner, Nikolaus; Radcliffe, Enid (1967). Yorkshire: The West Riding. The Buildings of England. Penguin. ISBN 978-0-14-071017-5.
- Pevsner, Nikolaus; Williamson, Elizabeth (2003). Buckinghamshire. The Buildings of England. Yale University Press. ISBN 978-0-300-09584-5.
- Pevsner, Nikolaus; Neave, David (2005). Yorkshire: York and the East Riding. The Buildings of England. New Haven and London: Yale University Press. ISBN 0-300-09593-7.
- Physick, John; Darby, Michael (1973). Marble Halls – Drawings and Models of Victorian Secular Buildings. Eyre and Spottiswoode Ltd. ISBN 9780901486684.
- Pope-Hennessy, John, ed. (1971). Victorian Church Art. London: HMSO. OCLC 1027243102.
- Pullan, Richard Popplewell (1883). The Architectural Designs of William Burges A.R.A. B.T.Batsford. OCLC 40139673.
- Pullan, Richard Popplewell (1886). The House of William Burges A.R.A. B.T. Batsford. OCLC 19530002.
- Ribeyrol, Charlotte (2023). William Burges's Great Bookcase & The Victorian Colour Revolution. New Haven, US and London: Yale University Press. ISBN 978-0-300-26797-6.
- Richardson, Douglas Scott (1983). Gothic revival architecture in Ireland. Garland Publishers. ISBN 978-0-824-02723-0.
- Ritchie, Helen (2018). Designers and Jewellery 1850–1940: Jewellery and Metalwork from the Fitzwilliam Museum. London and New York: Philip Wilson. ISBN 9781781300671. OCLC 1055210835.
- RIBA (1882). Transactions of the Royal Institute of British Architects 1881–82. London: Royal Institute of British Architects. OCLC 461039989.
- Rowan, Eric (1985). Art in Wales: An Illustrated History, 1850–1980. Welsh Arts Council, University of Wales Press. ISBN 9780708308547.
- Saint, Andrew (2010). Richard Norman Shaw. New Haven and London: Yale University Press. ISBN 9-780300-15526-6.
- Sargent, Pauline (1977a). Catalogue of the Exhibition of Drawings from the Cardiff Castle Collection (1). Cardiff City Council. OCLC 913363590.
- Sargent, Pauline (1977b). Catalogue of the Exhibition of Stained Glass Cartoons from Cardiff Castle (2). Cardiff City Council. OCLC 5924452.
- Sheehan, Sean; Levy, Patricia (2002). Ireland Handbook. Footprint Travel Guides. ISBN 978-1-903-47125-8.
- Sherwood, Jennifer; Pevsner, Nikolaus (1996). Oxfordshire. The Buildings of England. New Haven and London: Yale University Press. ISBN 978-0-300-09639-2.
- Smith, Helen (1984). Decorative painting in the domestic interior in England and Wales, c. 1850–1890. Garland Pub. ISBN 978-0-8240-5986-6.
- Soros, Susan Weber; Walker, Stefanie (2004). Castellani And Italian Archaeological Jewelry. Bard Graduate Center for Studies in the Decorative Arts, Yale University Press. ISBN 978-0-300-10461-5.
- Steegman, John (1970). Victorian Taste – A study of the Arts and Architecture from 1830 to 1870. Nelson's University Paperbacks. ISBN 978-0-2626-9028-7.
- Stewart, David B. (1987). The making of a modern Japanese architecture: 1868 to the present. Kodansha International. ISBN 978-0-870-11844-9.
- Sutcliffe, Anthony (2006). London: an architectural history. Yale University Press. p. 135. ISBN 978-0-300-11006-7.
- Turnor, Reginald (1950). Nineteenth Century Architecture in Britain. Batsford. OCLC 520344.
- Verey, David; Brooks, Alan (2002) [1970]. Gloucestershire 2: The Vale and the Forest of Dean. The Buildings of England. Yale University Press. ISBN 0-300-09733-6.
- Vost's Fine Art Auctioneers and Valuers (1999). The Mirrored Sideboard designed by William Burges. Miro Press.
- Weinreb, Ben; Hibbert, Christopher (1983). The London Encyclopaedia. Macmillan. ISBN 978-0-333-32556-8.
- Wells, Matthew (2023). Modelling the Metropolis: The Architectural Model in Victorian London. Architectural Knowledge. Zurich: gta Verlag. ISBN 978-3-856-76435-7.
- Whiting, R. C. (1993). Oxford: Studies in the History of a University Town Since 1800. Manchester University Press ND. ISBN 978-0-7190-3057-4.
- Williams, Matthew (2019). Cardiff Castle and the Marquesses of Bute. London: Scala Arts & Heritage Publishers Ltd. ISBN 978-1-785-51234-6. OCLC 10975772153.
