= List of furniture by William Burges =

William Burges (1827–1881) was an English architect, born in London. He trained under Edward Blore and Matthew Digby Wyatt. As well as buildings, Burges was a noted designer of furniture. His Great Bookcase has been described as "the most important example of Victorian painted furniture ever made". (Note: The Great Bookcase was bought by Kenneth Clark during his brief tenure as Director of the Asmolean Museum.)

The list attempts to detail the most notable of Burges’s individual pieces of furniture, with their original locations, their dates of construction and their current locations where known. Some significant schemes of Burges furniture are, in essence, entire room fittings, such as the library at Cardiff Castle, and listings of these have not been attempted.

== Pieces ==
Name	Original location	Photograph	Date	Notes	Present location
St. Bacchus sideboard			1858	In the collection of the Detroit Institute of Arts. Dated 1858, stained, painted, and gilded wood with marble and iron mounts. Detroit Institute of Arts, Gift of Mr. and Mrs. M.E. Cunningham, F82.50	Detroit Institute of Arts
Architecture Cabinet	The Tower House, Library		1858	originally at Buckingham Street	Present location unknown.
Yatman Cabinet		Cabinet of 1858 by William Burges	1858	For the Rev. H. G. Yatman	Victoria and Albert Museum
Flax and Wool Cabinet			1858	For the Rev. H. G. Yatman	Private collection
Wheel of Fortune table	Treverbyn Vean		1858-59	for Col. C. L. Somers Cocks	Private collection
Sideboard and wine cabinet, also known as the Mirrored Buffet			1859	Sold at Vost's Auctioneers, Newmarket, England in 1999.	Art Institute of Chicago
Wines and Beers sideboard			1859	For James Nicholson	Victoria and Albert Museum
Great Bookcase	The Tower House, Library		1859–62	Originally at Buckingham Street before being moved to The Tower House. Bought at the 1933 contents sale by Kenneth Clark, then director of the Ashmolean, for £50.	Ashmolean Museum, Oxford
Flax and Wool wardrobe	Buckingham Street		1859, 1870		Private collection.
Taylor bookcase			1862		The Higgins Art Gallery & Museum, Bedford
Dante Bookcase	The Tower House, Armoury		1862-1869	originally at Buckingham Street	Present location unknown.
Chest of drawers	The Tower House		c.1865	Originally at Buckingham Street	Present location unknown
Chest of drawers with stand	The Tower House, Burges's bedroom		1865	originally at Buckingham Street	Manchester City Art Gallery
The Red Bed	The Tower House, Burges's bedroom		1865-1867		The Higgins Art Gallery & Museum, Bedford
Narcissus washstand	The Tower House, Burges's bedroom		1865–1867		The Higgins Art Gallery & Museum, Bedford
Crocker Dressing Table	The Tower House, Burges's bedroom		1867		The Higgins Art Gallery & Museum, Bedford
The Clock cabinet (escritoire)			1867		Manchester City Art Gallery
Side Table	The Tower House		1867		Birmingham Museum and Art Gallery
Side Table	The Tower House		1867		Lotherton Hall
Escritoire	The Tower House, Drawing room		1867-1868		Present location unknown.
Dog Cabinet	The Tower House, Day nursery		1869		Present location unknown.
Zodiac settle	The Tower House, Drawing room		1869–1873		The Higgins Art Gallery & Museum, Bedford
Peacock Cabinet	The Tower House, Drawing room		1873		Private British collection
Alphabet Bookcases	The Tower House, Library		1876		In situ
Cupboard doors	The Tower House, Drawing room				The Higgins Art Gallery & Museum, Bedford
Wardrobe	The Tower House, Burges's bedroom				Private British collection
Philosophy Cabinet	The Tower House, Guest bedroom		1878–79		Private collection of Andrew Lloyd Webber
Golden Bed	The Tower House, Guest bedroom		1879	On loan from the Victoria & Albert Museum	Knightshayes Court, Devon
Vita Nuova Washstand	The Tower House, Guest bedroom		1879–80		Victoria & Albert Museum, London
Nursery wardrobe	The Tower House, Day nursery				The Higgins Art Gallery & Museum, Bedford
Two chairs	The Tower House				William Morris Gallery
Bronze trefoil table	The Tower House, Entrance hall		1880		Private collection
