= The Tower House =

Late-Victorian townhouse in London, England

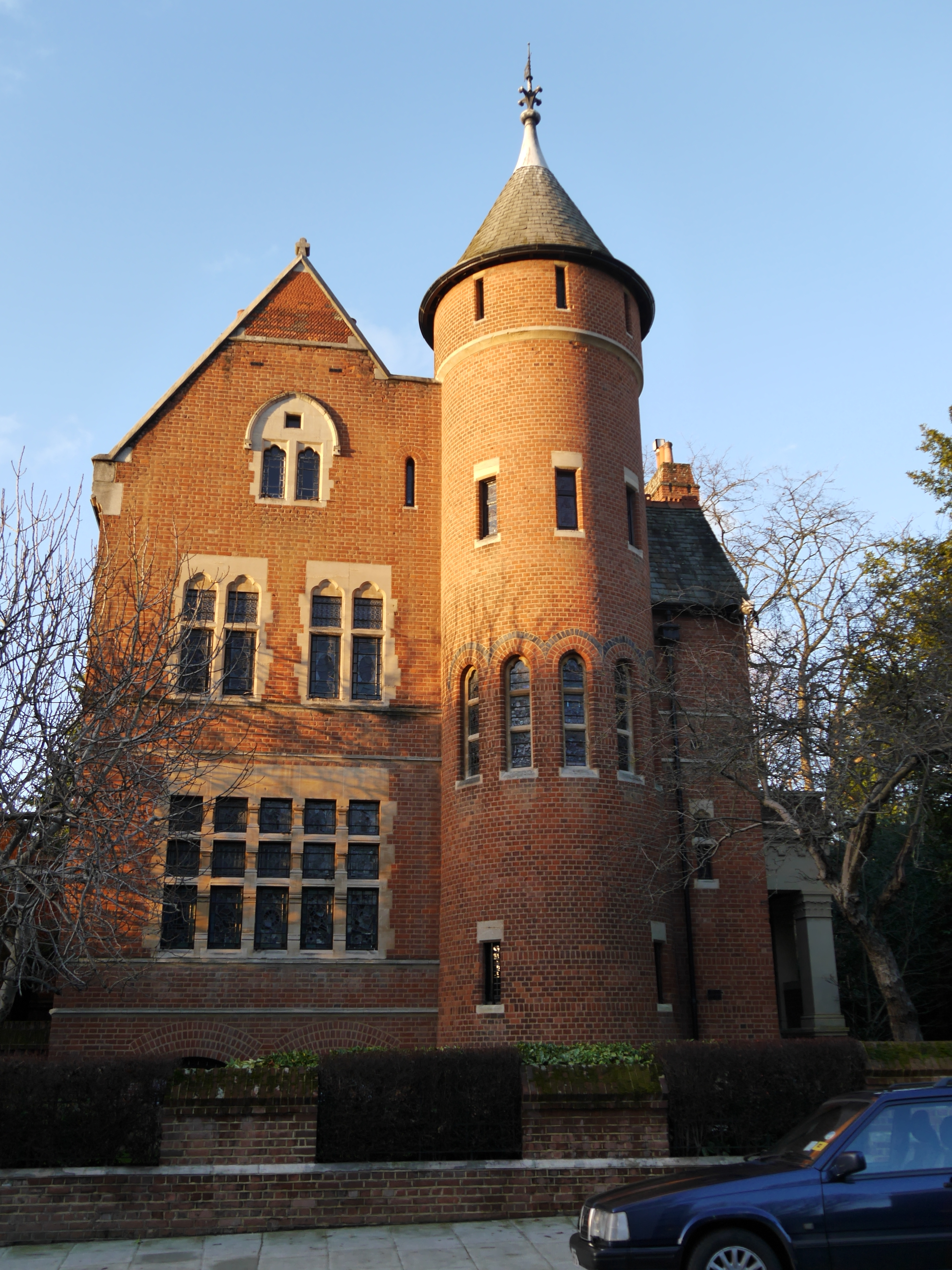
- Location in the Royal Borough of Kensington and Chelsea, London
- 51°29′59″N 0°12′11″W
- Location: Holland Park, Royal Borough of Kensington and Chelsea, West London, England

History
- Built: 1875–1881; 145 years ago

Site notes
- Architect: William Burges
- Architectural style: Gothic Revival
- Governing body: Privately owned

Listed Building – Grade I
- Official name: The Tower House
- Designated: 29 July 1949; 77 years ago
- Reference no.: 1225632

The Tower House, 29 Melbury Road, is a late-Victorian townhouse in the Holland Park district of Kensington and Chelsea, London, built by the architect and designer William Burges as his home. Designed between 1875 and 1881, in the French Gothic Revival style, it was described by the architectural historian J. Mordaunt Crook as "the most complete example of a medieval secular interior produced by the Gothic Revival, and the last". The house is built of red brick, with Bath stone dressings and green roof slates from Cumbria, and has a distinctive cylindrical tower and conical roof. The ground floor contains a drawing room, a dining room and a library, while the first floor has two bedrooms and an armoury. Its exterior and the interior echo elements of Burges's earlier work, particularly Park House in Cardiff and Castell Coch. It was designated a Grade I listed building in 1949.

Burges bought the lease on the plot of land in 1875. The house was built by the Ashby Brothers, with interior decoration by members of Burges's long-standing team of craftsmen such as Thomas Nicholls and Henry Stacy Marks. By 1878 the house was largely complete, although interior decoration and the designing of numerous items of furniture and metalwork continued until Burges's death in 1881. The house was inherited by his brother-in-law, Richard Popplewell Pullan. It was later sold to Colonel T. H. Minshall and then, in 1933, to Colonel E. R. B. Graham. The poet John Betjeman inherited the remaining lease in 1962 but did not extend it. Following a period when the house stood empty and suffered vandalism, it was purchased and restored, first by Lady Jane Turnbull, later by the actor Richard Harris and then by the musician Jimmy Page.

The house retains most of its internal structural decoration, but much of the furniture, fittings and contents that Burges designed has been dispersed. Many items, including the Great Bookcase, the Zodiac settle, the Golden Bed and the Red Bed, are now in museums such as the Ashmolean in Oxford, the Higgins in Bedford and the Victoria and Albert in London, while others are in private collections.

== Location and setting ==
The Tower House is on a corner of Melbury Road, just north of Kensington High Street, in the district of Holland Park. It stands opposite Stavordale Lodge and next to Woodland House, built for the artist Luke Fildes. The development of Melbury Road in the grounds of Little Holland House created an art colony in Holland Park, the Holland Park Circle. Its most prominent member, Frederic, Lord Leighton, lived at Leighton House, 12 Holland Park Road, and at the time of Leighton's death in 1896 six Royal Academicians, as well as one associate member, were living in Holland Park Road and Melbury Road.

== History ==
=== Design, construction and craftsmanship, 1875–78 ===
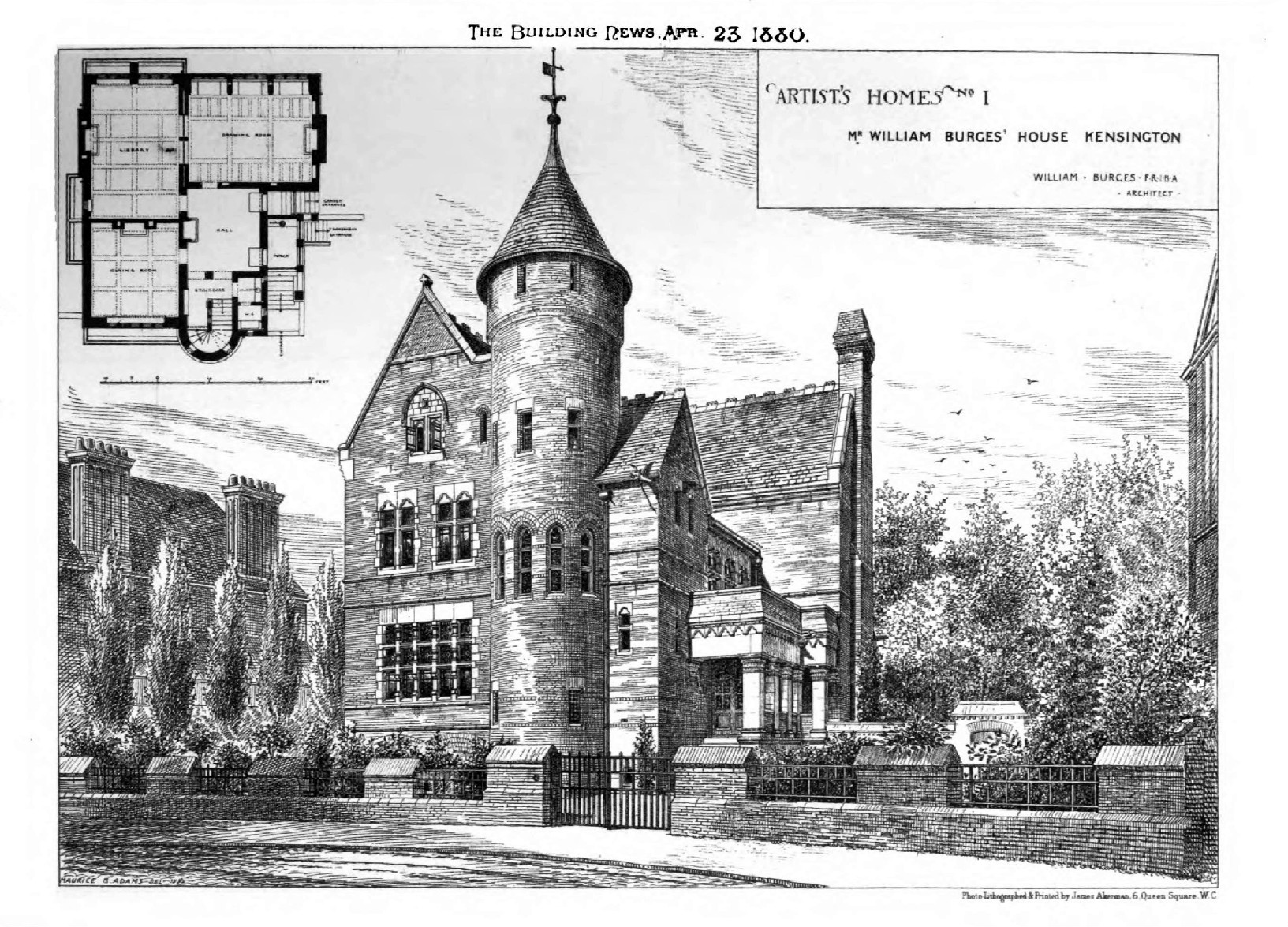
The Tower House in 1878

In 1863, William Burges gained his first major architectural commission, Saint Fin Barre's Cathedral, Cork, at the age of 35. In the following twelve years, his architecture, metalwork, jewellery, furniture and stained glass led his biographer, J. Mordaunt Crook to suggest that Burges rivaled Pugin as "the greatest art-architect of the Gothic Revival". But by 1875, his short career was largely over. Although he worked to finalise earlier projects, he received no further major commissions, and the design, construction, decoration and furnishing of the Tower House occupied much of the last six years of his life. In December 1875, after rejecting plots in Victoria Road, Kensington and Bayswater, Burges purchased the leasehold of the plot in Melbury Road from the Earl of Ilchester, the owner of the Holland Estate. The ground rent was £100 per annum. Initial drawings for the house had been undertaken in July 1875 and the final form was decided upon by the end of the year. Building began in 1876, contracted to the Ashby Brothers of Kingsland Road at a cost of £6,000.

At the Tower House Burges drew on his own "experience of twenty years learning, travelling and building", and used many of the artists and craftsmen who had worked with him on earlier buildings. An estimate book compiled by him, and now in the Victoria and Albert Museum, contains the names of the individuals and companies that worked at the house. Thomas Nicholls was responsible for the stone carving, including the capitals, corbels and the chimneypieces. The mosaic and marble work was contracted to Burke and Company of Regent Street, while the decorative tiles were supplied by W. B. Simpson and Sons Ltd of the Strand. John Ayres Hatfield crafted the bronze decorations on the doors, while the woodwork was the responsibility of John Walden of Covent Garden. Henry Stacy Marks and Frederick Weekes were employed to decorate the walls with murals, and Campbell and Smith of Southampton Row had responsibility for most of the painted decoration. Marks painted birds above the frieze in the library, and the illustrations of famous lovers in the drawing room were by Weekes. They also painted the figures on the bookcases in the library. The stained glass was by Saunders and Company of Long Acre, with initial designs by Horatio Walter Lonsdale.

=== Burges to Graham, 1878–1962 ===
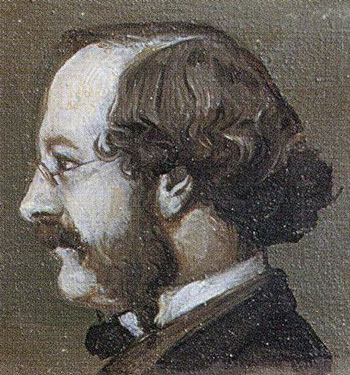
Burges in 1875

Burges spent his first night at the house on 5 March 1878. It provided a suitable backdrop for entertaining his range of friends, "the whole gamut of Pre-Raphaelite London." His dogs, Dandie, Bogie and Pinkie, are immortalised in paintings on various pieces of furniture such as the Dog Cabinet and the foot of The Red Bed. Burges displayed his extensive collection of armour in the armoury. The decoration of his bedroom hints at another of his passions: a fondness for opium. Stylised poppies cover the panels of a cupboard which was set next to his bed.

In 1881, after catching a chill while overseeing work at Cardiff, Burges returned, half paralysed, to the house where he lay dying for some three weeks. (Note: For much of the 19th century, "a chill" was used as a diagnosis for illness involving a fever and associated chills, in contrast to modern medical approaches which would regard a fever and chills as symptoms of an underlying disease.) Among his last visitors were Oscar Wilde and James Whistler. Burges died in the Red Bed on 20 April 1881, just over three years after moving into the Tower House; he was 53 years old. He was buried in West Norwood Cemetery.

The lease on the house was inherited by Burges's brother-in-law, Richard Popplewell Pullan. Pullan completed some of Burges's unfinished projects and wrote two studies of his work. The lease was then purchased by Colonel T. H. Minshall, author of What to Do with Germany and Future Germany, and father of Merlin Minshall. Minshall sold his lease to Colonel E. R. B. and Mrs. Graham in 1933. The Tower House was designated a Grade I listed building on 29 July 1949.

=== Betjeman to Turnbull, 1962–69 ===
John Betjeman was a friend of the Grahams and was given the remaining two-year lease on the house, together with some of the furniture, on Mrs. Graham's death in 1962. Betjeman, a champion of Victorian Gothic Revival architecture, was an early admirer of Burges. In 1957 the Tower House had featured in the fifth episode of his BBC television series, An Englishman's Castle. In a radio interview of 1952 about Cardiff Castle Betjeman spoke of the architect and his foremost work: "a great brain has made this place. I don't see how anyone can fail to be impressed by its weird beauty ... awed into silence from the force of this Victorian dream of the Middle Ages."

Because of a potential liability for £10,000 of renovation work upon the expiry of the lease, Betjeman considered the house too costly to maintain, and subsequently vacated it. From 1962 to 1966, the house stood empty and suffered vandalism and neglect. A survey undertaken in January 1965 revealed that the exterior stonework was badly decayed, dry rot had eaten through the roof and the structural floor timbers, and the attics were infested with pigeons. Vandals had stripped the lead from the water tanks and had damaged the mirrors, fireplaces and carving work. The most notable loss was the theft of the carved figure of Fame from the Dining Room chimneypiece. Betjeman suggested that the owner's agents had deliberately refused to let the house, and allowed it to decline, intending to demolish it and redevelop the site. Writing in Country Life in 1966, Charles Handley-Read took a different view saying that "the Ilchester Estate, upon which the house is situated, are anxious that it should be preserved and [have] entered into a long lease conditional upon the house being put into a state of good repair." In March 1965, the Historic Buildings Council obtained a preservation order on the house, enabling the purchaser of the lease, Lady Jane Turnbull, daughter of William Grey, 9th Earl of Stamford, to initiate a programme of restoration the following July. These renovations were supported by grants of £4,000 from the Historic Buildings Council and £3,000 from the Greater London Council. The lease was sold in 1969.

=== Harris and Page, 1969 onwards ===
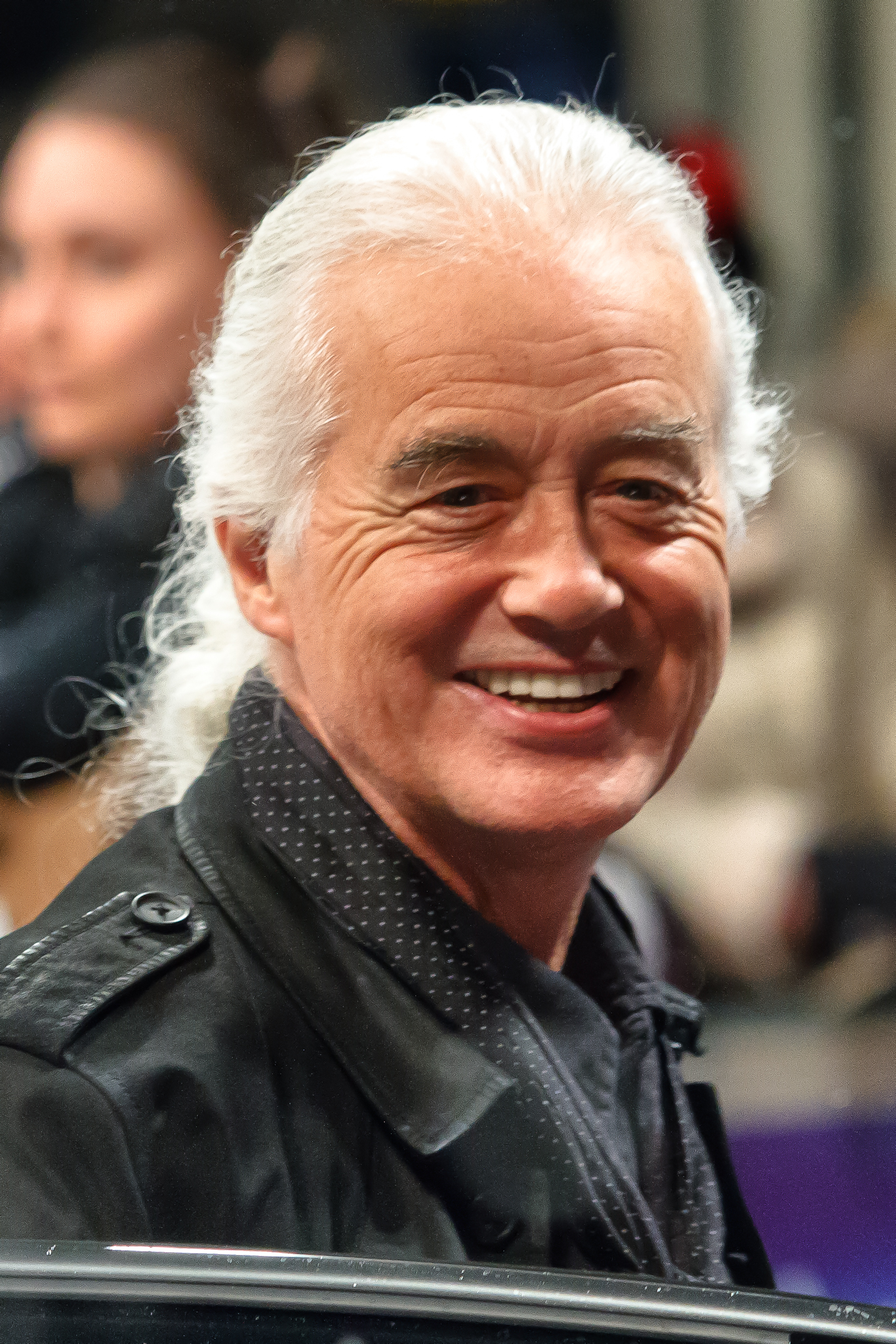
Jimmy Page, who purchased the house in 1972

The actor Richard Harris bought the lease for £75,000 in 1969 after discovering that the American entertainer Liberace had made an offer but had not put down a deposit. Reading of the intended sale in the Evening Standard, Harris bought it the following day, describing his purchase as the biggest gift he had ever given himself. In his autobiography, the entertainer Danny La Rue recalled visiting the house with Liberace, writing, "It was a strange building and had eerie murals painted on the ceiling [...] I sensed evil". Meeting La Rue later, Harris said he had found the house haunted by the ghosts of children from an orphanage that he believed had previously occupied the site and that he had placated them by buying them toys. Harris employed the original decorators, Campbell Smith & Company Ltd., to carry out restoration, using Burges's drawings from the Victoria and Albert Museum.

Jimmy Page, the Led Zeppelin guitarist, bought the house from Harris in 1972 for £350,000, outbidding the musician David Bowie. Page, an enthusiast of Burges and for the Pre-Raphaelite Brotherhood, commented in an interview in 2012: "I was still finding things 20 years after being there – a little beetle on the wall or something like that; it's Burges's attention to detail that is so fascinating." In 2015, Page successfully challenged a planning application lodged by the singer Robbie Williams, who had purchased the adjacent Woodland House in 2013 and planned extensive renovations. Page argued that the alterations, particularly the intended underground excavations, would threaten the structure of the Tower House. Ongoing disagreements between Williams and Page over Williams' development plans continue to feature in Britain's press.

== Architecture ==
=== Exterior and design ===
"The house was exactly as he (Burges) had made and furnished it – massive, learned, glittering, amazing [...] It was strange and barbarously splendid; none more than he could be minutely intimate with the thought of old art or more saturated with a passion for colour, sheen and mystery. Here were silver and jade, onyx and malachite, bronze and ivory, jewelled casements, rock crystal orbs, marble inland with precious metal; lustre iridescence and colour everywhere; vermillion and black, gold and emerald; everywhere device and symbolism, and a fusion of Eastern feeling with his style."

— The architectural historian William Lethaby describing the Tower House

The cultural historian Caroline Dakers wrote that the Tower House was a "pledge to the spirit of Gothic in an area given over to Queen Anne". Burges loathed the Queen Anne style prevalent in Holland Park, writing that it: "like other fashions [...] will have its day, I do not call it Queen Anne art, for, unfortunately I see no art in it at all". His inspirations were French Gothic domestic architecture of the thirteenth century and more recent models drawn from the work of the 19th-century French architect Viollet-le-Duc. Architectural historians Gavin Stamp and Colin Amery considered that the building "sums up Burges in miniature. Although clearly a redbrick suburban house, it is massive, picturesquely composed, with a prominent tourelle (Note: A tourelle is a type of circular turret.) for the staircase which is surmounted by a conical roofed turret." Burges's neighbour Luke Fildes described the house as a "model modern house of moderately large size in the 13th-century style built to show what may be done for 19th-century everyday wants".

The house has an L-shaped plan, and the exterior is plain, of red brick, with Bath stone dressings and green roof slates from Cumberland. With a floor plan of 2,500 square feet (230 m^{2}), Burges went about its construction on a grand scale. The architect R. Norman Shaw remarked that the concrete foundations were suitable "for a fortress". This approach, combined with Burges's architectural skills and the minimum of exterior decoration, created a building that Crook described as "simple and massive". Following his usual pattern, Burges re-worked many elements of earlier designs, adapting them as appropriate. The frontages come from the other townhouse he designed, Park House, Cardiff, then known as the McConnochie House after its owner, although they have been reversed, with the arcaded, street front from Park House forming the garden front of the Tower House. The staircase is consigned to the conical tower, avoiding the error Burges made at the earlier house, where he placed the staircase in the middle of the hall. The cylindrical tower and conical roof derive from Castell Coch, and the interiors are inspired from examples at Cardiff Castle. The house has two main floors, with a basement below and a garret above. The ground floor contains a drawing room, a dining room and a library, while the first floor has two bedrooms and an armoury.

=== Plan ===
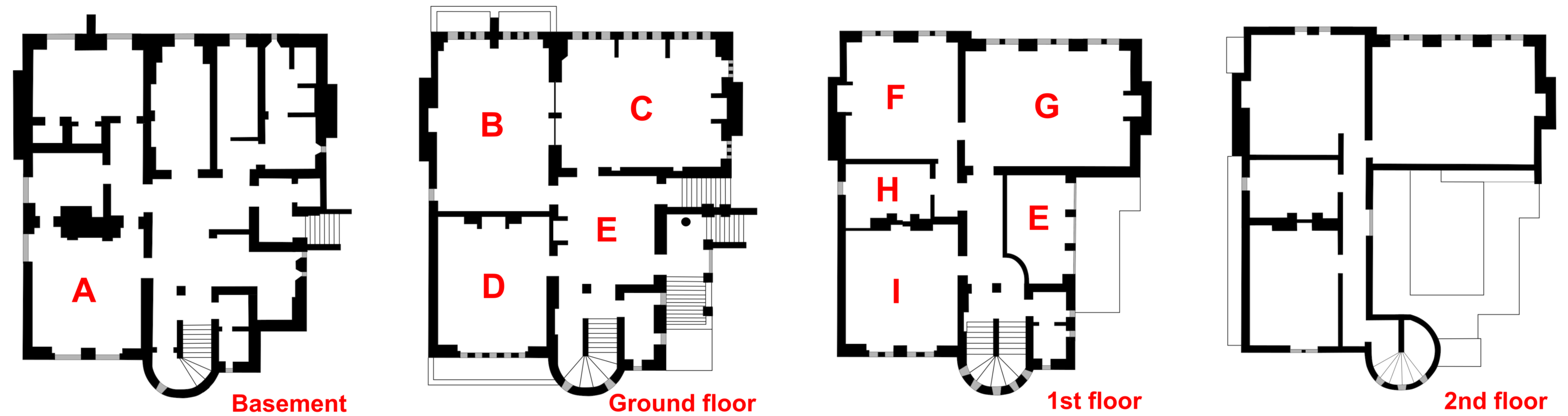
Plan of the house:
- A – kitchen
- B – library
- C – drawing room
- D – dining room
- E – hall
- F – main bedroom
- G – armoury
- H – bathroom
- I – guest room
See also: Ground floor plan

=== Interior ===
The architectural writer Bridget Cherry wrote that "the sturdy exterior gives little hint of the fantasy [Burges] created inside", interiors which the art historian and Burges scholar Charles Handley-Read described as "at once opulent, aggressive, obsessional, enchanting, their grandeur border[ing] on grandiloquence". Each room has a complex iconographic scheme of decoration: in the hall it is Time; in the drawing room, Love; in Burges's bedroom, the Sea. Massive fireplaces with elaborate overmantels were carved and installed, described by Crook as "veritable altars of art [...] some of the most amazing pieces of decoration Burges ever designed". Handley-Read considered that Burges's decorations were "unique, almost magical [and] quite unlike anything designed by his contemporaries".

==== Ground floor ====
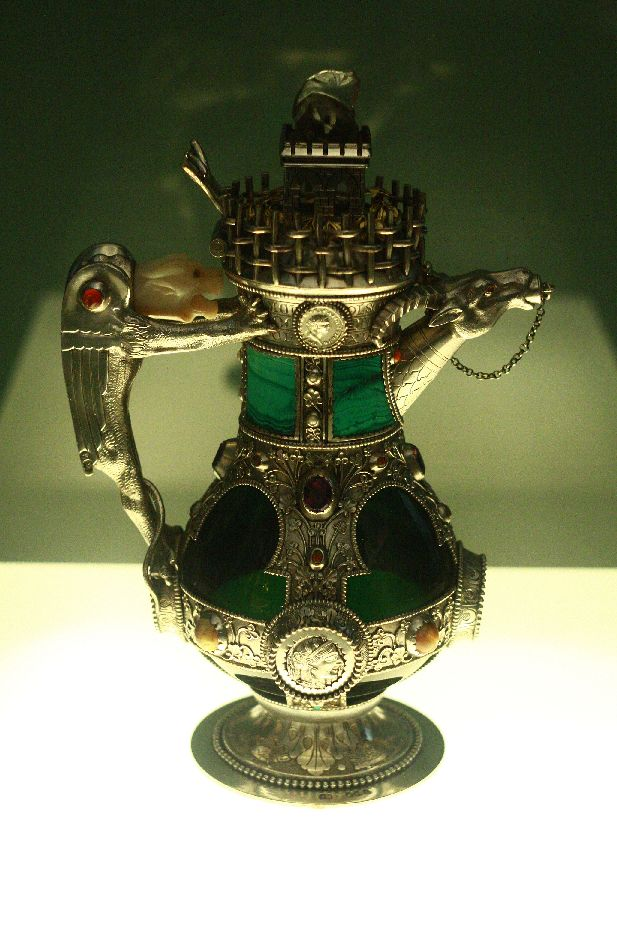
A Burges decanter, made in 1865, which was once used by him in the house

A bronze-covered door, with relief panels depicting figures, opens onto the entrance hall. In Burges's time the door had a letterbox, in the form of Mercury, the messenger of the gods. The letterbox is now lost, but a contemporary copy is in the collection of The Higgins Art Gallery & Museum. The porch contains a white marble seat and column, and on the floor is a mosaic of Pinkie, a favourite poodle of Burges. Cartooned by H. W. Lonsdale, it resembles the cave canem floor at Pompei.

The interior centres on the double-height entrance hall, with the theme of Time. The painted ceiling depicts the astrological signs of the constellations, arranged in the positions they held when the house was first occupied. A large stained glass window contains four female figures representing Dawn, Noon, Twilight and Night. A mosaic floor in the entrance hall contains a labyrinth design, with the centre depicting the myth of Theseus slaying the Minotaur. The garden's entrance door, also covered in bronze, is decorated with a relief of the Madonna and Child. As elsewhere, Burges incorporated earlier designs, the bronze doors echoing those at Cork Cathedral, and the maze floor recalling an earlier ceiling at Burges's office at 15 Buckingham Street. Emblems adorn the five doors on the ground floor, each one relevant to their respective room. A flower marked the door to the garden, with the front door marked by a key. The library is indicated by an open book, the drawing or music room by musical instruments, and the dining room by a bowl and flask of wine.

The library, its walls lined with bookcases, features a sculptured mantelpiece resembling the Tower of Babel. The hooded chimneypiece represents the "dispersion of languages", with figures depicting Nimrod ruling over the elements of speech. Two trumpeters represent the pronouns, a queen embodies the verb, a porter the noun, and numerous other gilded and painted figures are displayed. The ceiling is divided into eight compartments, with depictions of the six founders of law and philosophy: Moses, St. Paul, Luther, Mahomet, Aristotle and Justinian. An illuminated alphabet frieze of architecture and the visual arts running around the bookcases completes the scheme, with the letters of the alphabet incorporated, including a letter "H" falling below the cornice. Due to H-dropping being a social taboo in Victorian times, Handley-Read described it as the "most celebrated of all Burges's jokes". (Note: In another of Burges's jokes, the letter 'B' is represented by a Builder presenting an "uncommonly long Bill".) Artists and craftsmen are featured at work on each lettered door of the bookcases that surround the room. In a panel in one of the glazed doors which open onto the garden, Burges is shown standing in front of a model of the Tower House. He features as Architect, the 'A' forming the first letter of the alphabet frieze. Both the Architecture Cabinet and the Great Bookcase stood in this room. The stained glass windows in the room represent painting, architecture and sculpture, and were painted by Weekes.

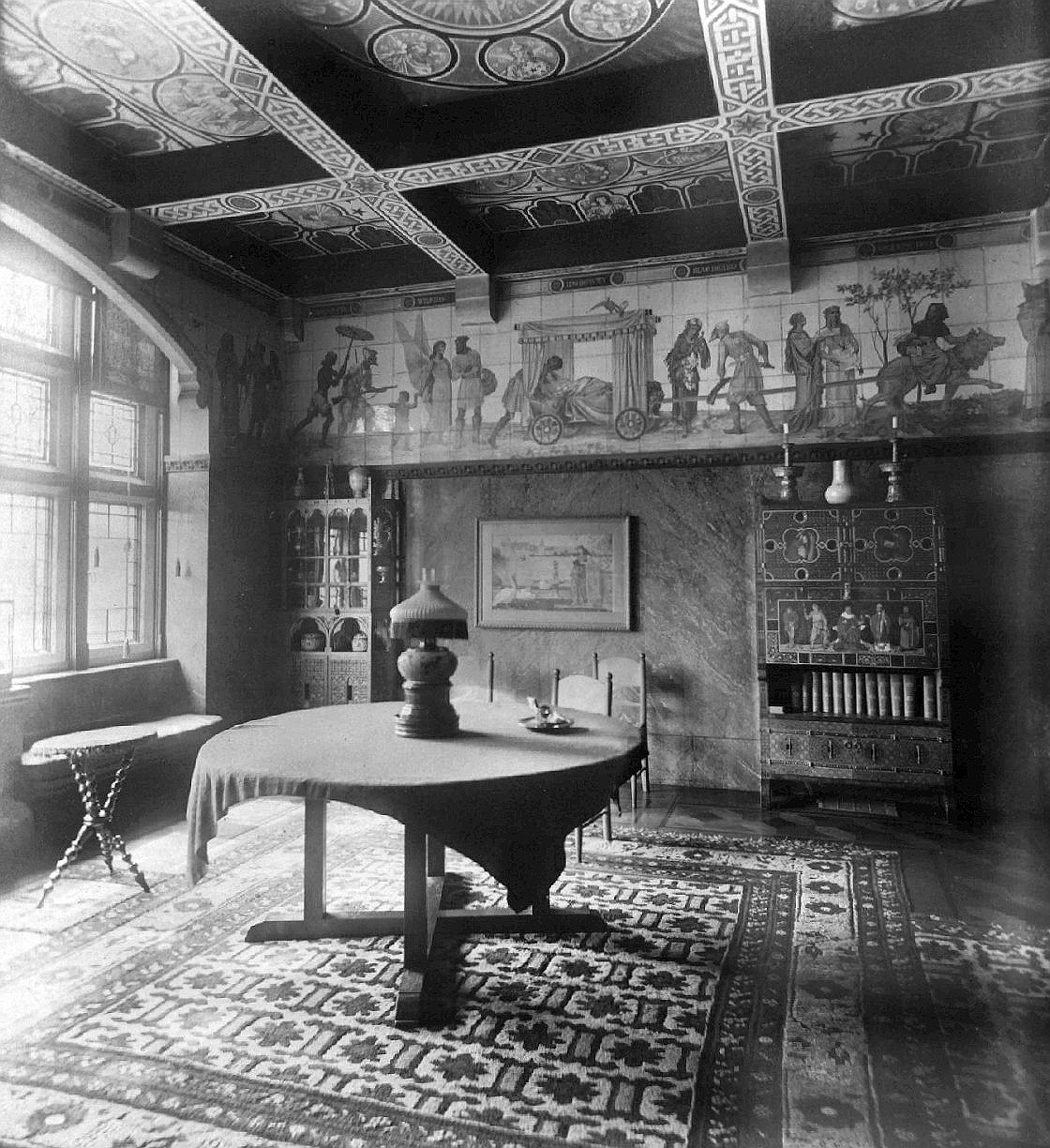
The dining room

On the wall opposite the library fireplace is an opening into the drawing room. Inside there are three stained glass windows which are set in ornamented marble linings. Opposite the windows stood the Zodiac Settle, which Burges moved from Buckingham Street. Love is the central decorative scheme to the room, with the ceiling painted with medieval cupids, and the walls covered with mythical lovers. Carved figures from the Roman de la Rose decorate the chimneypiece, which Crook considered "one of the most glorious that Burges and Nicholls ever produced". Echoing Crook, Charles Handley-Read wrote, "Working together, Burges and Nicholls had transposed a poem into sculpture with a delicacy that is very nearly musical. The Roman de la Rose has come to life."

The dining room is devoted to Geoffrey Chaucer's The House of Fame and the art of story-telling, Crook explaining that "tall stories are part of the dining room rite". The hooded chimneypiece, of Devonshire marble, contained a bronze figure above the fireplace representing the Goddess of Fame; its hands and face were made of ivory, with sapphires for eyes. It was later stolen. The tiles on the walls depict fairy stories, including Reynard the Fox, Jack and the Beanstalk and Little Red Riding Hood. (Note: These were completed after Burges' death.) The room also shows Burges's innovative use of materials: Handley-Read observed that the Victorians had "a horror of food smells" and therefore the room was constructed using materials that did not absorb odours and could be washed. The walls are covered with Devonshire marble, surmounted by glazed picture tiles, while the ceiling is of sheet metal. The ceiling is divided into coffered compartments by square beams and features symbols of the Sun, the planets and the signs of the Zodiac. Burges designed most of the cutlery and plates used in this room, which display his skills as a designer of metalwork, including the claret jug and Cat Cup chosen by Lord and Lady Bute as mementoes from Burges's collection after his death. The panels of the wine cupboard were decorated by Dante Gabriel Rossetti.

==== First floor and garret ====
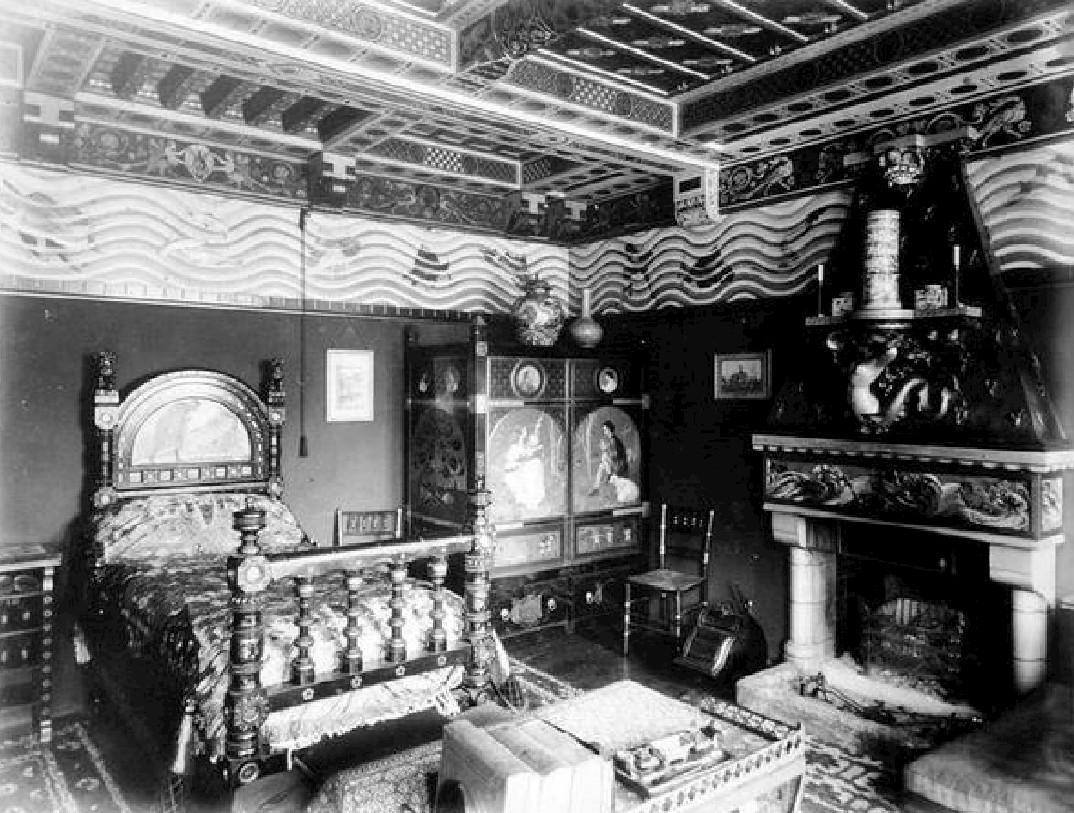
Burges's bedroom

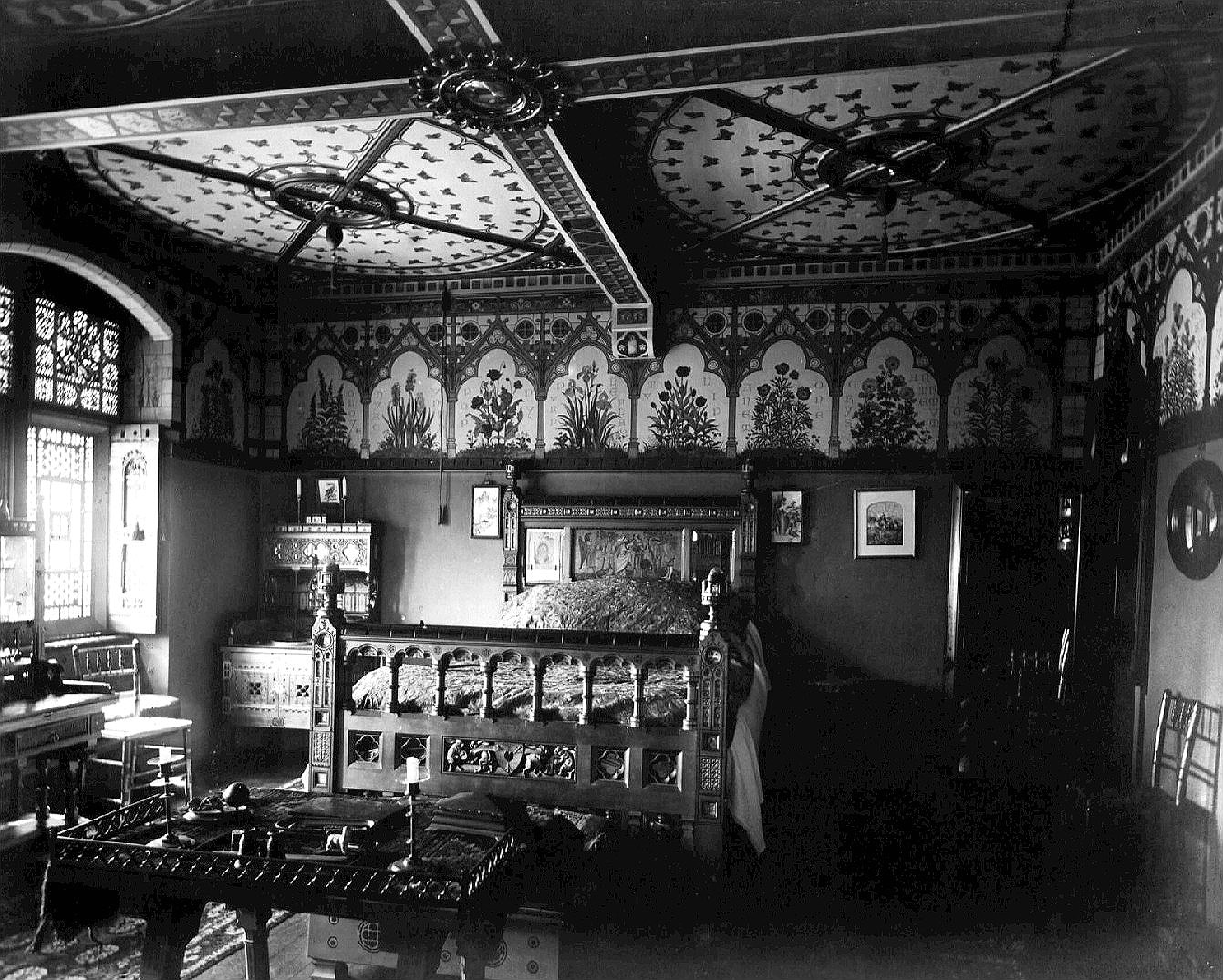
Guest bedroom

The windows of the stair turret represent "the Storming of the Castle of Love". On the first floor are two bedrooms and an armoury. Burges's bedroom, with a theme of sea creatures, overlooks the garden. Its elaborate ceiling is segmented into panels by gilded and painted beams, studded with miniature convex mirrors set in to gilt stars. Fish and eels swim in a frieze of waves painted under the ceiling, and fish are also carved in relief on the chimneypiece. On the fire-hood, a sculpted mermaid gazes into a looking-glass, with seashells, coral, seaweed and a baby mermaid also represented. Charles Handley-Read described the frieze around the Mermaid fireplace as "proto-Art Nouveau" and noted "the debt of international art nouveau to Victorian Gothic designers, Burges included". In this room, Burges placed two of his most personal pieces of furniture, the Red Bed, in which he died, and the Narcissus washstand, both of which originally came from Buckingham Street. The bed is painted blood red and features a panel depicting Sleeping Beauty. The washstand is red and gold; its tip-up basin of marble inlaid with fishes is silver and gold.

"The Earth and its productions" is the theme of the guest room facing the street. Its ceiling is adorned with butterflies and fleurs-de-lis, and at the crossing of the main beams is a convex mirror in a gilded surround. Along the length of the beams are paintings of frogs and mice. A frieze of flowers, once painted over, has since been restored. The Golden Bed and the Vita Nuova Washstand designed for this room are now in the Victoria and Albert Museum.

Burges designated the final room on the first floor an armoury and used it to display his large collection of armour. The collection was bequeathed to the British Museum upon his death. A carved chimneypiece in the armoury has three roundels carved with the goddesses Minerva, Venus and Juno in medieval attire.

The garret originally contained day and night nurseries, which the author James Stourton considers a surprising choice of arrangement for the "childless bachelor Burges". They contain a pair of decorated chimneypieces featuring the tale of Jack and the Beanstalk and three monkeys at play.

=== Garden ===
The garden at the rear of the house featured raised flowerbeds which Dakers described as being "planned according to those pleasances depicted in medieval romances; beds of scarlet tulips, bordered with stone fencing". On a mosaic terrace, around a statue of a boy holding a hawk, sculpted by Thomas Nicholls, (Note: The statue was no longer in the garden by 1916.) Burges and his guests would sit on "marble seats or on Persian rugs and embroidered cushions." The garden, and that of the adjacent Woodland House, contain trees from the former Little Holland House.

== Furniture ==
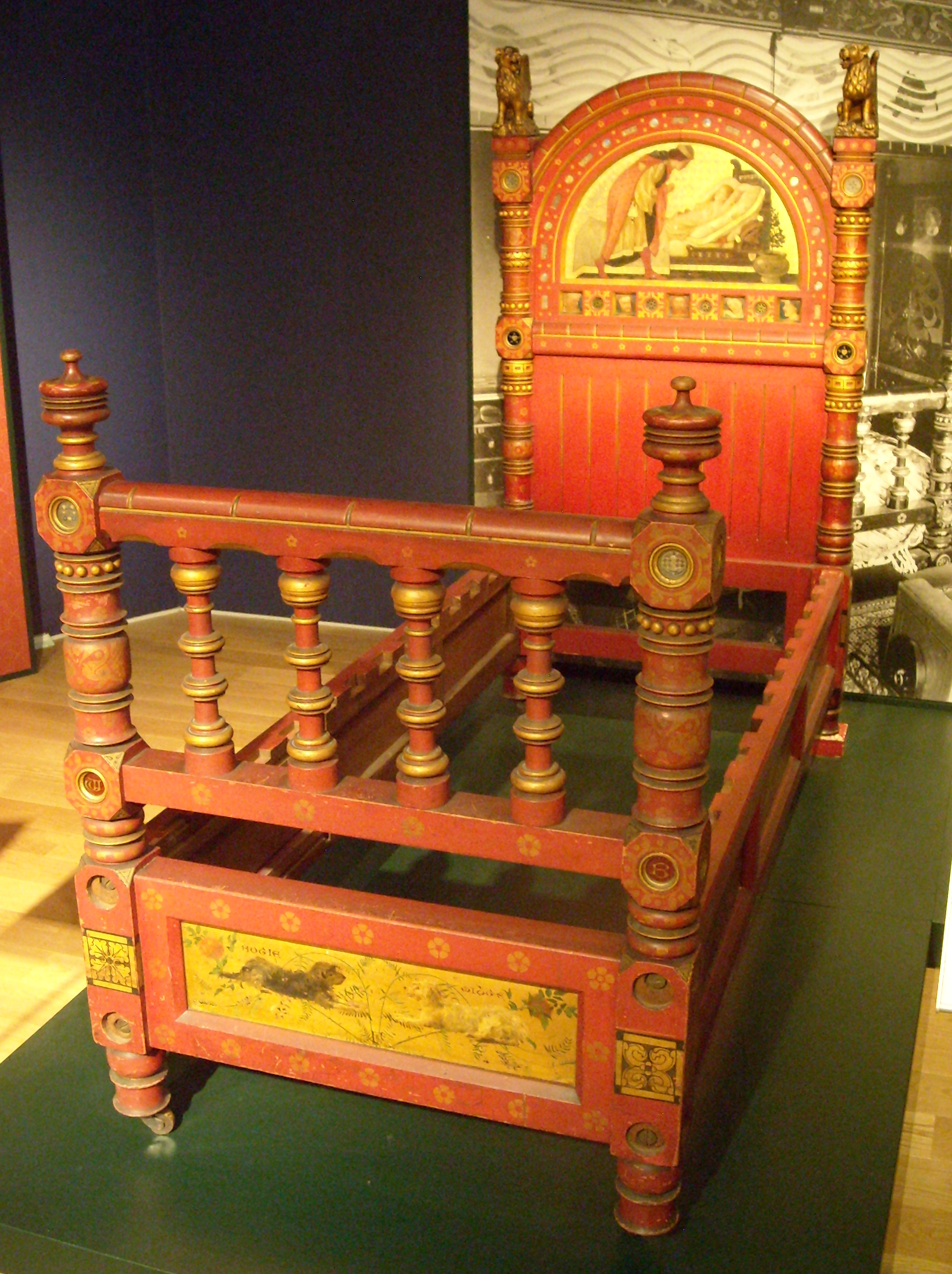
The Red Bed, in which Burges died on 20 April 1881

In creating the interior of the house, Burges demonstrated his skill as a jeweller, metalworker and designer. He included some of his best pieces of furniture such as the Zodiac Settle, the Dog Cabinet and the Great Bookcase, the last of which Charles Handley-Read described as "occupying a unique position in the history of Victorian painted furniture". The fittings were as elaborate as the furniture: the tap for one of the guest washstands was in the form of a bronze bull from whose throat water poured into a sink inlaid with silver fish. Within the Tower House Burges placed some of his finest metalwork; the artist Henry Stacy Marks wrote, "he could design a chalice as well as a cathedral ... His decanters, cups, jugs, forks and spoons were designed with an equal ability to that with which he would design a castle."

Burges's furniture did not receive universal acclaim. In his major study of English domestic architecture, Das englische Haus, published some twenty years after Burges's death, Hermann Muthesius wrote of The Tower House, "Worst of all, perhaps, is the furniture. Some of it is in the earlier manner, some of it box-like and painted all over. This style had now become fashionable, though with what historical justification it is not easy to say".

Many of the early pieces of furniture, such as the Narcissus Washstand, the Zodiac Settle and the Great Bookcase, were originally made for Burges's office at Buckingham Street and were later moved to the Tower House. The Great Bookcase was also part of Burges's contribution to the Medieval Court at the 1862 International Exhibition. Later pieces, such as the Crocker Dressing Table and the Golden Bed, and its accompanying Vita Nuova Washstand, were made specifically for the house. John Betjeman located the Narcissus Washstand in a junk shop in Lincoln and gave it to Evelyn Waugh, a fellow enthusiast for Victorian art and architecture, who featured it in his 1957 novel, The Ordeal of Gilbert Pinfold. Betjeman later gave Waugh both the Zodiac Settle and the Philosophy Cabinet.

Many of the decorative items Burges designed for the Tower House were dispersed in the decades following his death. Kenneth Clark purchased the Great Bookcase for the Ashmolean Museum. (Note: Kenneth Clark’s purchase of the Great Bookcase in 1933 was farsighted. Acknowledging that it was “not acceptable to present taste”, he nonetheless recognised it as “an important document in the history of the Pre-Raphaelite movement.”) Several pieces purchased by Charles Handley-Read, who was instrumental in reviving interest in Burges, were acquired by The Higgins Art Gallery & Museum, Bedford. The museum also bought the Zodiac Settle from the Waugh family in 2011.

=== Dispersed furniture and locations ===
The table below lists the known pieces of furniture originally in situ, with their dates of construction and their current location where known.

Original room	Piece	Date	Location
Entrance hall	Bronze table	1880	Private collection
Library	Great Bookcase, originally at Buckingham Street	1859–62	Ashmolean Museum
Library	Architecture Cabinet, originally at Buckingham Street	1858	Unknown
Library	Alphabet Bookcases	1876	In situ
Drawing room	Cupboard doors		The Higgins Art Gallery & Museum, Bedford
Drawing room	Peacock Cabinet	1873	Private British collection
Drawing room	Zodiac settle	1869–71	The Higgins Art Gallery & Museum, Bedford
Dining Room	Escritoire, originally at Buckingham Street	1867–68	Unknown
Burges's bedroom	The Red Bed	1865–67	The Higgins Art Gallery & Museum, Bedford
Burges's bedroom	Crocker Dressing Table	1867	The Higgins Art Gallery & Museum, Bedford
Burges's bedroom	Narcissus washstand	1865–67	The Higgins Art Gallery & Museum, Bedford
Burges's bedroom	Wardrobe		Private British collection
Burges's bedroom	Chest of drawers and shelf unit		Manchester City Art Gallery
Guest bedroom	Golden Bed	1879	Victoria & Albert Museum (V&A)
Guest bedroom	Vita Nuova Washstand	1879–80	Victoria & Albert Museum (V&A)
Guest bedroom	Philosophy Cabinet	1878–79	Private collection of Andrew Lloyd Webber
Armoury	Dante Bookcase, originally at Buckingham Street	1862–69	In situ
Day nursery	Wardrobe		The Higgins Art Gallery & Museum, Bedford
Day nursery	Dog Cabinet	1869	Unknown
Unknown room	Table	1867	Birmingham Museum and Art Gallery
Unknown room	Table	1867	Lotherton Hall
Unknown room	Two chairs		William Morris Gallery
Unknown room	Chest of drawers, originally at Buckingham Street	c. 1865	Unknown

== Architectural coverage ==
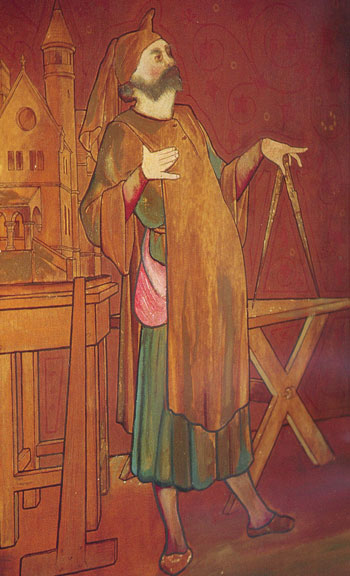
Burges as Architect, by Frederick Weekes. A model of the Tower House is in the background.

Edward Godwin, fellow architect and close friend of Burges, wrote of Burges's unified approach to building and design in an article in The British Architect, published in 1878: "the interior and the exterior, the building and its furniture, the enclosed as well as the enclosure, are in full accord." Richard Popplewell Pullan described the house in detail in the second of two works he wrote about his brother-in-law, The House of William Burges, A.R.A., published in 1886. The book contains photographs of the interior of the house by Francis Bedford. In 1893, the building was the only private house to be recorded in an article in The Builder, which gave an overview of the architecture of the previous fifty years. It was referenced again a decade later by Muthesius, who described it as "the most highly developed Gothic house to have been built in the 19th century (and) the last to be built in England". It was then largely ignored, with James Stourton describing its early twentieth-century decline as "a paradigm of the reputation of the Gothic Revival".

A renewed understanding and appreciation of the building, and of Burges himself, began with Charles Handley-Read's essay on Burges in Peter Ferriday's collection Victorian Architecture, published in 1963. In 1966 Handley-Read followed this with a substantial article on the house for Country Life, "Aladdin's Palace in Kensington". His notes on Burges formed the basis of Mordaunt Crook's centenary volume, William Burges and the High Victorian Dream, published in 1981 and revised and reissued in 2013, in which Crook wrote at length on both the Tower House and its contents.

More recent coverage was given in London 3: North West, the revision to the Buildings of England guide to London written by Nikolaus Pevsner and Bridget Cherry, published in 1991 (revised 2002). The house is referenced in Matthew Williams's William Burges (2004), and in Panoramas of Lost London by Philip Davies, published in 2011, which includes some of Francis Bedford's photographs of the house from 1885. In a chapter on the building in Great Houses of London (2012), the author James Stourton called The Tower House "the most singular of London houses, even including the Soane Museum."
