= Park House, Cardiff =

Town house in Cardiff, Wales

Park House
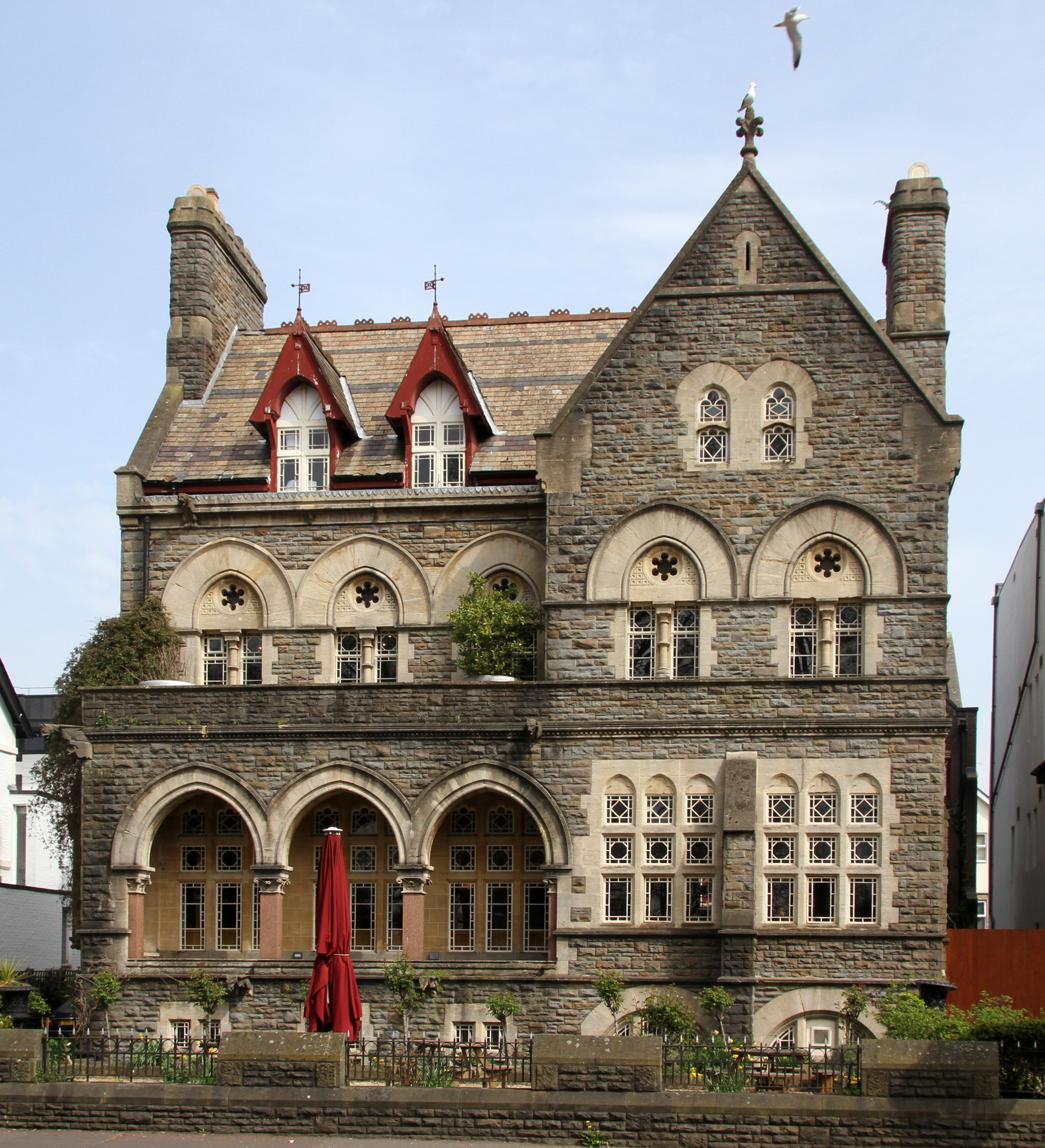

- Location within Wales
- 51.4849°N 3.1756°W
- Type: House
- Location: Cardiff, Wales

History
- Built: 1871-4

Site notes
- Architect: William Burges
- Architectural style: Victorian
- Governing body: Privately owned

Listed Building – Grade I
- Official name: Park House
- Designated: 25 January 1966
- Reference no.: 13772

Park House (Welsh: Tŷ Parc; formerly McConnochie House), 20 Park Place, Cardiff, Wales, is a nineteenth century town house. It was built for John McConnochie, Chief Engineer to the Bute Docks, by the Gothic revivalist architect William Burges. It is a Grade I listed building. The architectural historian John Newman writes that the architectural style of the house "revolutionized Cardiff's domestic architecture," and Cadw considers the building "perhaps the most important 19th century house in Wales."

== History ==
Commissioned by McConnochie in 1871, the house was completed externally by 1874, although decoration of the interior continued, somewhat slowly, until McConnochie's Cardiff mayoral year of 1880. The surveyor was J. Holden. The house was much admired at the time of its construction, being referenced by Viollet-le-Duc and its plans displayed at the Royal Academy. Today, the house is of particular interest for three reasons; as the precursor of Burges' own house in Kensington, as evidence of one of the few architectural errors Burges made in his career and as a template for an architectural style which had a significant influence on late Victorian and early Edwardian Cardiff. "By its powerful early French Gothic style, its steep roofs and boldly textured walls (the house) revolutionized Cardiff's domestic architecture." It was later renamed as Park House.

From 2005 the building housed a restaurant which closed in 2023. In a publicity stunt in 2012, the then owner wrapped the building with a giant red ribbon. As this had been done without listed building consent, Cardiff Council demanded its removal.

== Architecture and description ==
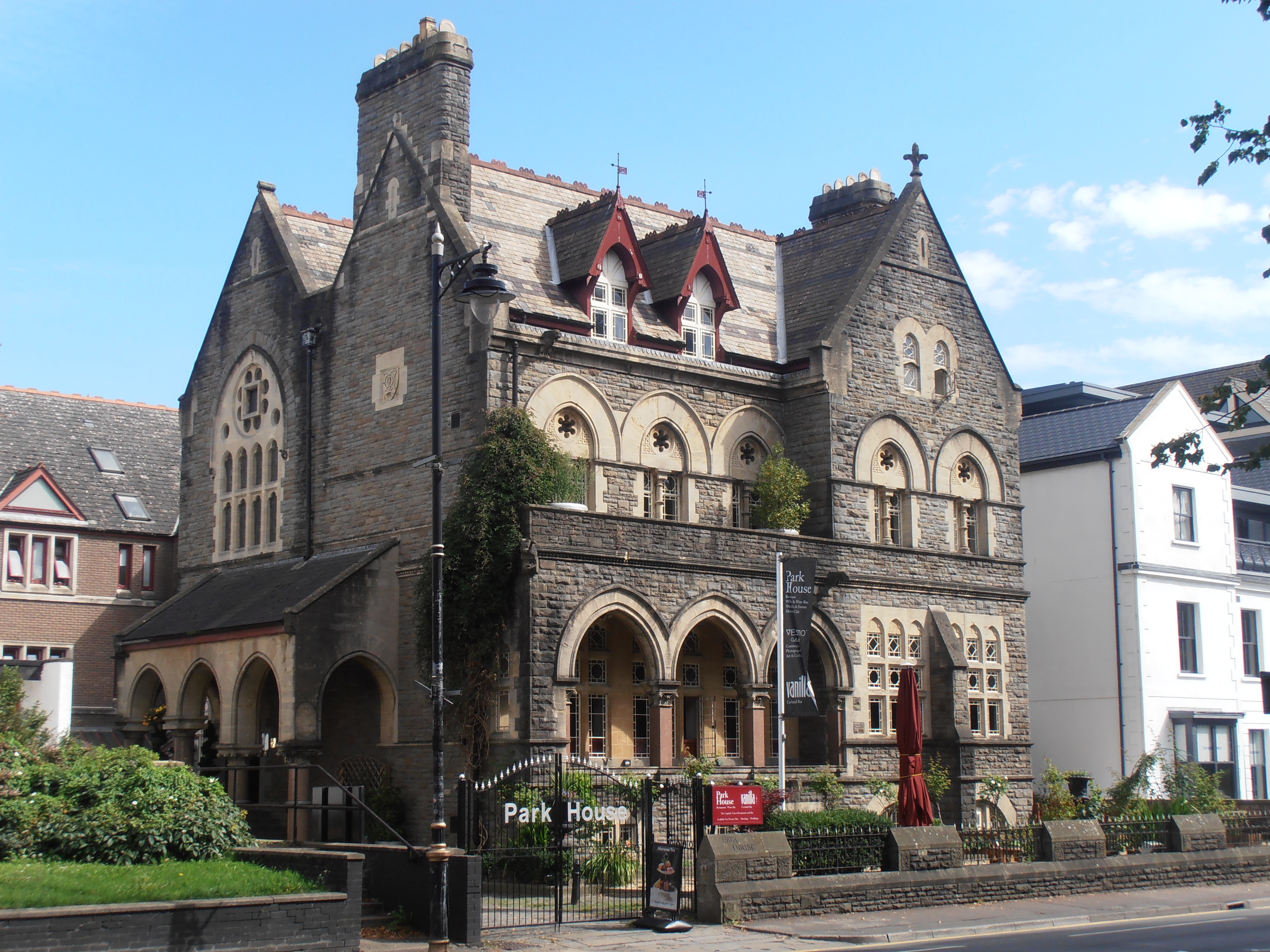
Side view of Park House

The style of the house is Burges's signature Early French Gothic, with triangle and rectangle to the fore, although it is without the conical tower felt appropriate for Burges's own home and for Castell Coch. The external frontage comprises four gables, with an open arcade to the front and a loggia at the side. The windows of the last gable conceal the major error of the interior; on entering the visitor is immediately confronted with the underside of the colossal main staircase. J. Mordaunt Crook, Burges's biographer, found it hard to understand how Burges could have made such a mistake. It was not repeated at The Tower House, which is a near replica, albeit reversed, and with the addition of a conical tower. The house is of two storeys, with an attic and a basement. Burges used various building stones for Park House, Pennant Sandstone for the walls, Bath stones around the windows, entrance porch and plinths, while the pillars are pink Peterhead granite from Aberdeenshire.

The style of the house was widely imitated, in Cardiff and beyond. Henry-Russell Hitchcock, the American architecture critic, thought Park House "one of the best medium-sized stone dwellings of the High Victorian Gothic". (Note: Writing in the 1960s, in the Architecture: Nineteenth and Twentieth Centuries volume of the Pelican History of Art series, Hitchcock described Park House as "superior in almost every way to Burges's own home at 9 Melbury Road in London", a judgement unlikely to be endorsed in the early 21st century.) John Newman, in his Glamorgan volume in the Buildings of Wales series, suggested that the building "revolutionized Cardiff's domestic architecture", while John B. Hilling, in his 2018 study, The Architecture of Wales, notes that "it became the model for other houses in the area." Cadw has described Park House as "perhaps the most important 19th century house in Wales" and designated it a Grade I listed building.

== Sources ==
- Crook, J. Mordaunt (1981). The Strange Genius of William Burges. Cardiff: Amgueddfa Cymru – Museum Wales. ISBN 978-0-720-00259-1.
- — (2013). William Burges and the High Victorian Dream. London: Frances Lincoln. ISBN 978-0-711-23349-2.
- Dakers, Caroline (1999). The Holland Park Circle: Artists and Victorian Society. New Haven, US and London: Yale University Press. ISBN 978-0-300-08164-0.
- Hiling, John B. (2016). The History and Architecture of Cardiff Civic Centre. Cardiff: University of Wales Press. ISBN 978-1-78316-842-2.
- — (2018). The Architecture of Wales: From the First to the Twenty-First Centuries. Cardiff: University of Wales Press. ISBN 978-1-786-83285-6.
- Hitchcock, Henry-Russell (1968) [1958]. Architecture: Nineteenth and Twentieth Centuries. Pelican History of Art. London: Penguin Books. OCLC 851173836.
- Newman, John (2001). Glamorgan. The Buildings of Wales. London: Penguin Books. ISBN 978-0-300-09629-3.
