= Great Bookcase =

Bookcase designed by William Burges

The Great Bookcase
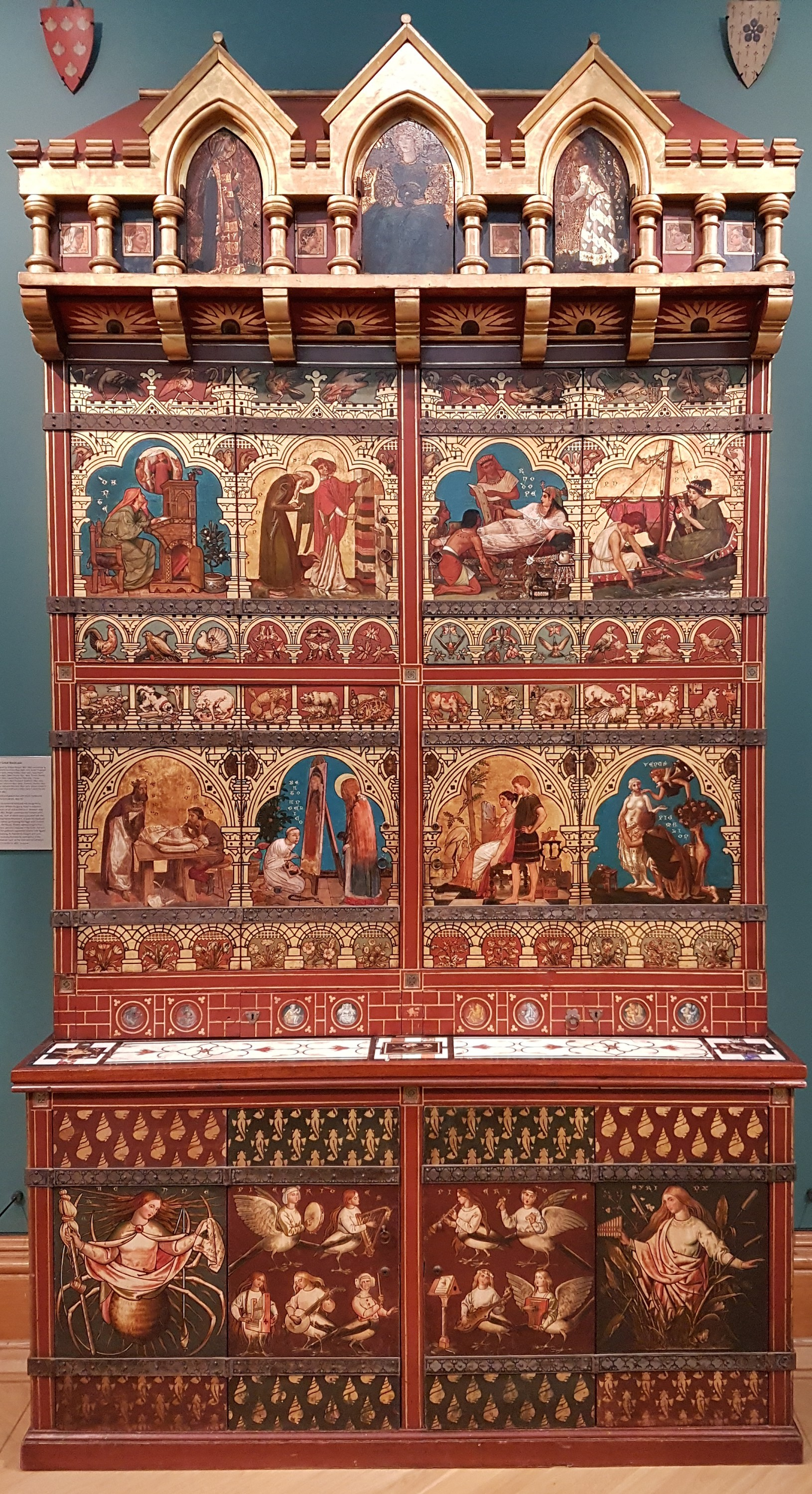
- Designer: William Burges; Painters: William Burges, Edward Burne-Jones, John Anster Fitzgerald, Henry Holiday, Stacy Marks, Albert Moore, Thomas Morton, Edward Poynter, Dante Gabriel Rossetti, Charles Rossiter, Frederick Smallfield, Simeon Solomon, William Frederick Yeames, Frederick Weeks, Nathaniel Westlake
- Date: 1859–62
- Made in: London, England
- Materials: Oak, carved, painted and gilt
- Style / tradition: High Victorian Gothic, Pre-Raphaelite
- Height: 317.5 cm (125 in)
- Width: 173.9 cm (68.5 in)
- Depth: 49.5 cm (19.5 in)
- Collection: Ashmolean Museum, Oxford

The Great Bookcase is a large piece of painted furniture designed by the English architect and designer William Burges.

== History ==
William Burges designed the Great Bookcase in 1859. The bookcase is 10 feet (3.0 m) high and 5 feet (1.5 m) wide. It has been described as "the most important example of Victorian painted furniture ever made."

The paintings on the bookcase depict pagan and Christian art depicted in "allegories of poetry, architecture, sculpture, painting and music". Believed to have been constructed by the firm of Thomas Sneddon, it was designed in 1859 and finished in 1862. Christian themes are painted on the left side of the bookcase, and pagan themes on the right, decorated by fourteen Pre-Raphaelite and Victorian artists.

The bookcase was included in the 1862 International Exhibition in London, where it was displayed in the Medieval Court. A cabinet designed by Burges and painted by Poynter was also displayed at the exhibition. The Great Bookcase was poorly received by the Building News and Architectural Review at the exhibition.

The bookcase was designed by Burges to hold his collection of art books, and was originally displayed at his rooms in Buckingham Street in London. It was later placed in the library at the house Burges had designed for himself, The Tower House in Holland Park. The architectural writer and collector and Burges connoisseur Charles Handley-Read described the bookcase as "occupying a unique position in the history of Victorian painted furniture."

In 1933, the bookcase was purchased for the Ashmolean Museum by Kenneth Clark, Clark paying £50. After periods on display at the Victoria and Albert Museum and at Knightshayes Court, the bookcase has now been returned to the collection of the museum in Oxford and is on show in its Pre-Raphaelite gallery.

== Decoration ==
Fourteen artists were involved in the decoration of the bookcase; Edward Burne-Jones, John Anster Fitzgerald, Henry Holiday, Stacy Marks, Albert Moore, Thomas Morten, Edward Poynter, Dante Gabriel Rossetti, Charles Rossiter, Frederick Smallfield, Simeon Solomon, William Frederick Yeames, Fred Weeks, Nathaniel Westlake, and Burges himself.

The decoration of the front of the bookcase is divided into two sides, featuring pagan and Christian themes, the themes are as follows:

Christian decoration:	Pagan decoration:
St. John and the New Jerusalem – by Solomon The apparition of Beatrice to Dante – by Poynter and Rossetti Edward I and Torrel – by Moore Fra Angelico painting the Virgin – by Morten	Rhodopis commissioning a pyramid – by Poynter Sappho serenading Phaon – by Holiday Apelles painting the first portrait – by Smallfield Pygmalion and Galatea – by Solomon

On the sides of the bookcase are depicted Saint Augustine by Solomon, Plato by Rossiter, Saint Cecilia by Morten, Orpheus by Yeames, Sirens by Fitzgerald, and Harpies by Weeks. The base of the bookcase features four metamorphosic figures, in the form of Arachne, the Pierides and Syrinx, all painted by Marks. Decorative bands run horizontally between each section of the bookcase. The bands feature paintings by Poynter of the "Sea, the Earth, and the Air", "Shells and Fishes of the Ocean", "Flowers and Beasts of the Field", the "Birds of the Air", and the "Stars of the Firmament". Two designs on the bands were painted by Burges, of Aesop's fables and the story of Cock Robin.

Above the front panels is a cornice decorated with muses painted by Poynter, and surmounting the cornice are three painted gables. The three gables feature painted depictions of 'Religion' and 'Love' by Westlake, and between them, 'Art' by Burne-Jones.

The interior of the bookcase is also decorated, with birds painted by Marks. After the bookcase fell over in 1878, extra decoration was added inside with the addition of allegories of eight metals by Weeks to replace paintings by Fitzgerald damaged in the fall.

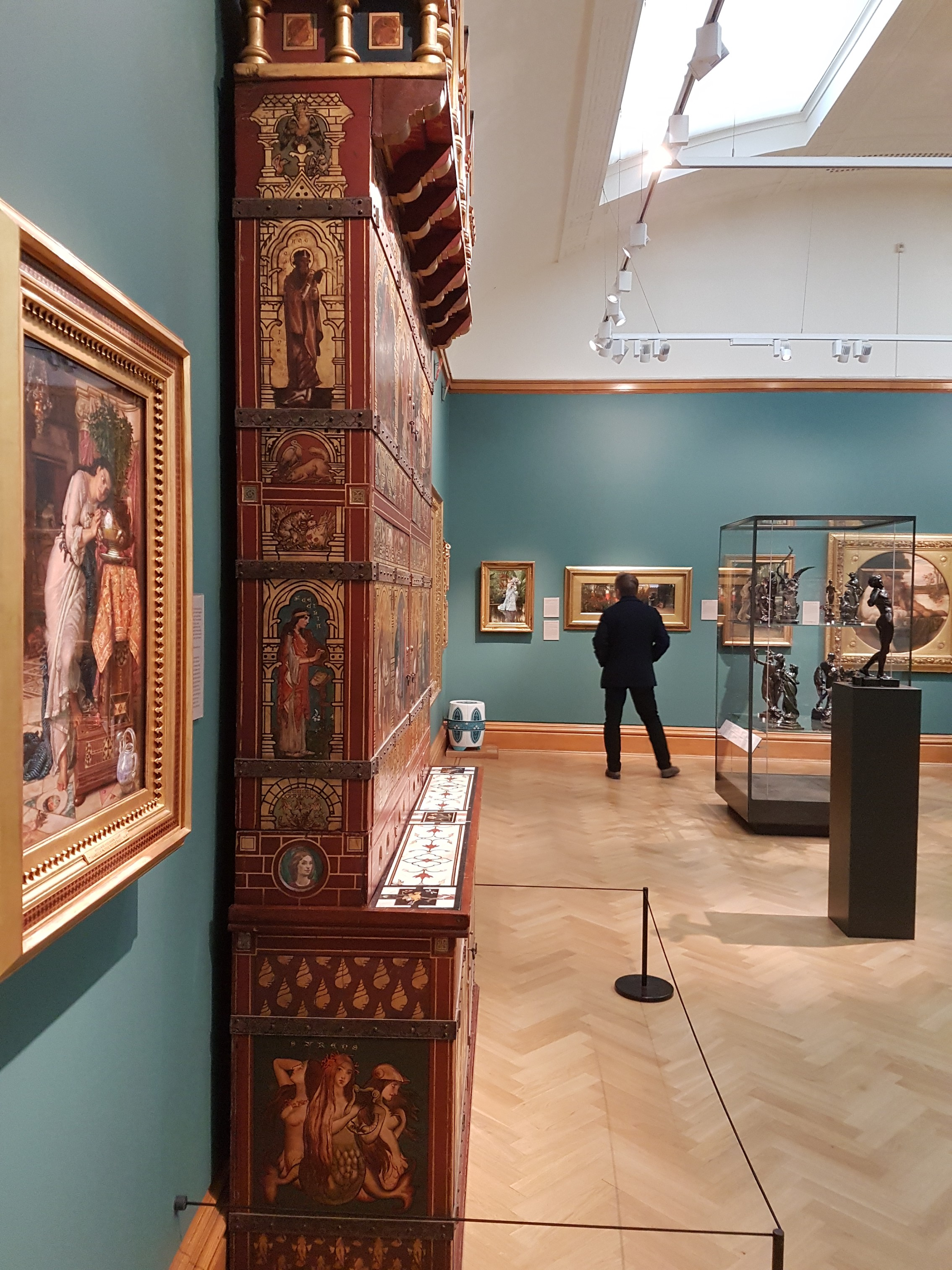
Left side view

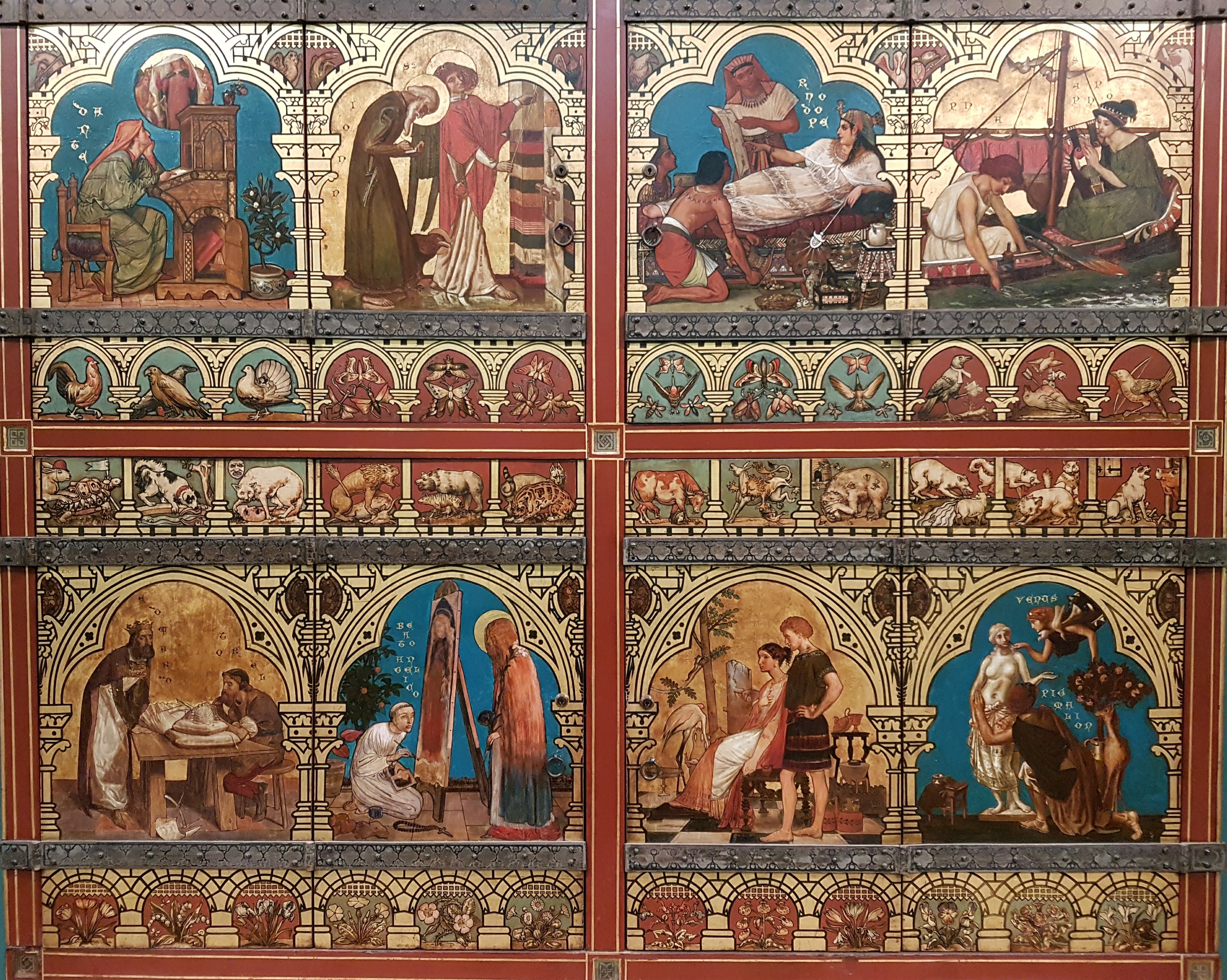
Detail

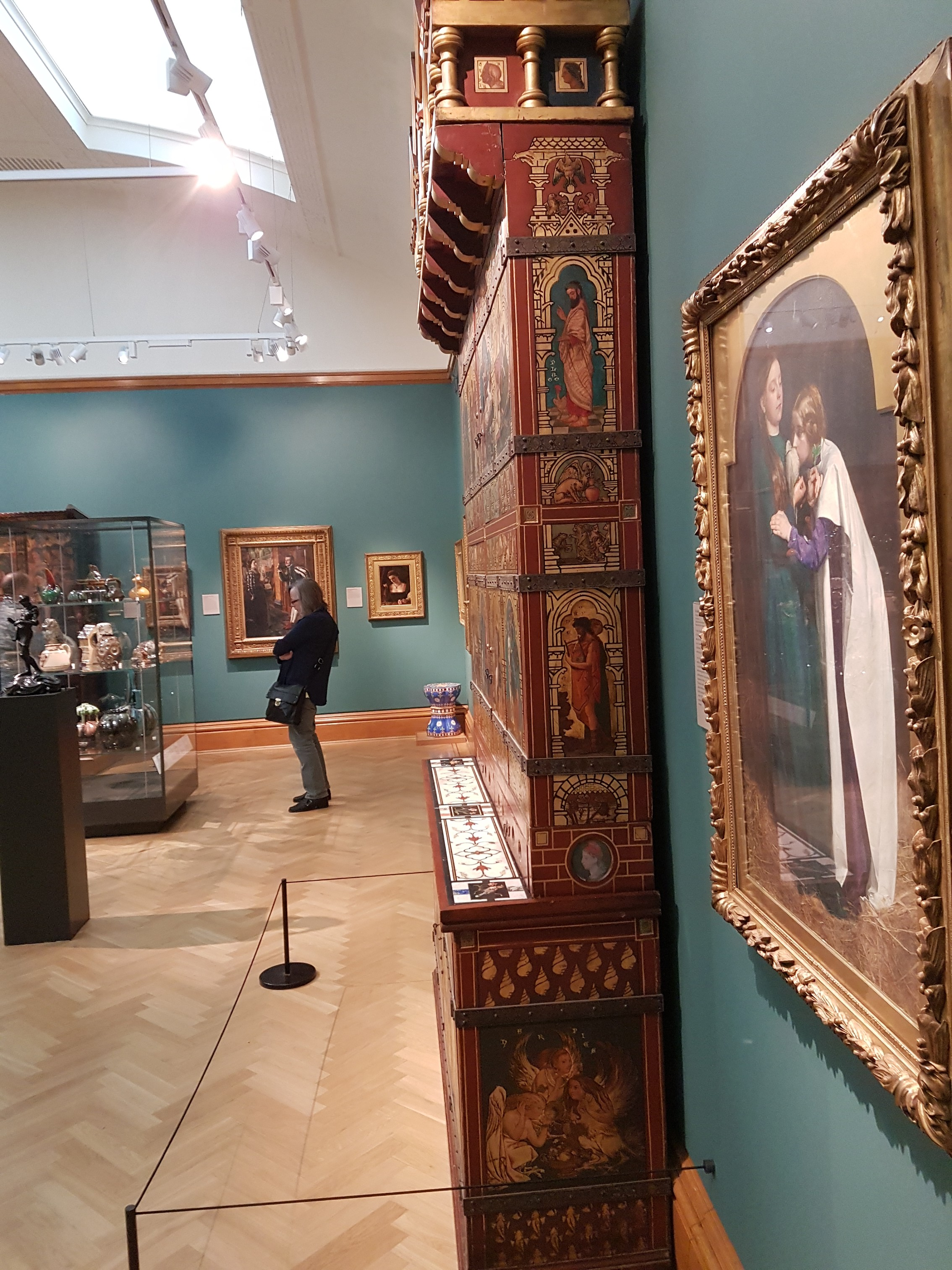
Right side view
