= Flax and Wool Cabinet =

Piece of painted furniture

The Flax and Wool Cabinet or the Flax and Wool Wardrobe is a large piece of painted furniture designed by the English architect and designer William Burges. It may have been the first large piece of painted furniture that Burges designed.

The cabinet is one of three large pieces of furniture that Burges designed that were displayed at the Architectural Exhibition in Connaught Street, London, in 1859. The other two pieces were the Architectural Cabinet, and the Yatman Cabinet. At the exhibition the three pieces were described as having been made in the preceding 12 months, and it is not definitively known which piece was made first. The cabinet was commissioned by Burges's patron H. G. Yatman. The cabinet is part of the private collection of the Italian art collectors Francesca and Massimo Valsecchi, and was displayed as part of a selection of pieces from their collection at the Fitzwilliam Museum in Cambridge, England, in 2017.

== Decoration ==
The two panel paintings depicting the characters of 'Flax' and 'Wool' were painted by Frederick Smallfield. 'Flax' is portrayed as a girl holding a distaff and 'Wool' as a shepherd playing a pipe. It was described by art historian J. Mordaunt Crook in the 2012 reissue of his book William Burges and the High Victorian Dream as the simplest of the five pieces that Yatman commissioned from Burges between 1855 and 1859, and that its design is "nothing if not plain-spoken" with "quaintly Arcadian" symbolism. Cook speculates that the colouring on the cabinet might have been decorated with gold.

== Sources ==
- Crook, J. Mordaunt (2012). William Burges and the High Victorian Dream. London: Francis Lincoln. ISBN 978-0-711233-492.
