= Frederick Weekes =

English painter and designer

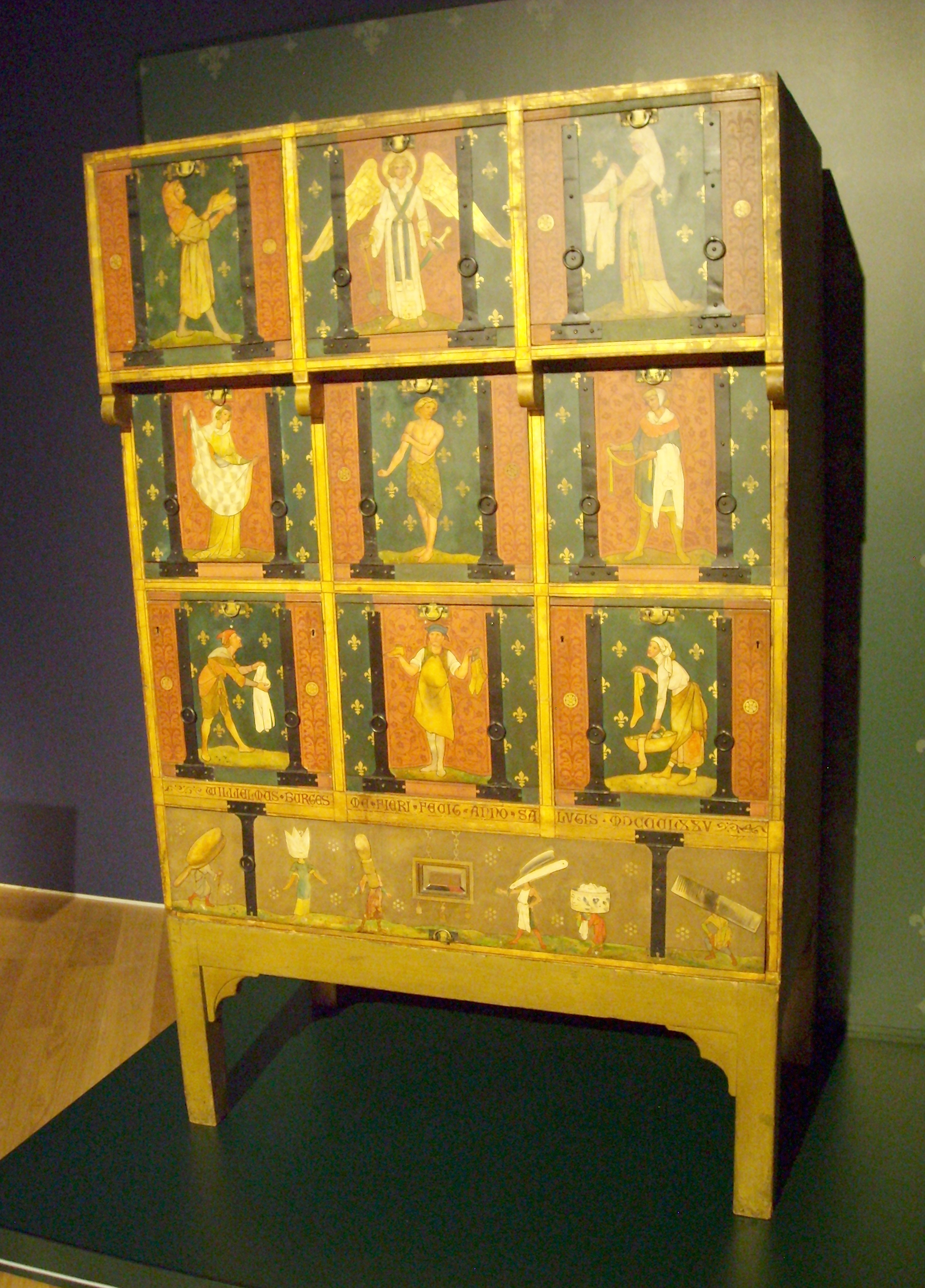
- A wardrobe, designed by Burges and painted by Weekes
- Born: 1834; London
- Died: 1924 (aged 89–90)
- Notable work: Saint Fin Barre's Cathedral; Church of Christ the Consoler; Cardiff Castle; Castell Coch; The Tower House

Frederick Weekes (1834-1924) was an English painter and designer. Son of the successful Victorian sculptor, Henry Weekes, two of his brothers also became artists, the genre and animal painters Herbert William Weekes and Henry Weekes Junior.

He established a long partnership with the architect William Burges, working with him on many of his major commissions, including Saint Fin Barre's Cathedral, Cardiff Castle, Castell Coch, the Yorkshire churches and Burges's own home in London, The Tower House.
