= Herbert William Weekes =

English painter

- Born: Herbert William Weekes; 8 May 1841; Pimlico, London, England
- Died: 21 November 1914; Primrose Hill, London, England
- Known for: genre and animal painting
- Movement: Victorian Neoclassical

Herbert William Weekes (8 May 1841 – 21 November 1914) was a well-known English genre and animal painter of the Victorian Neoclassical period who specialized in portraying animals in humorous, human-like situations.

== Early life and family ==
Weekes was born in Pimlico, London, England to a prominent artistic family: the youngest of five children, his father, Henry Weekes, Sr. (1807–1877), was a sculptor and Royal Academician; his brother, Henry, Jr. (fl. 1850–1884), was also a genre painter known for his animal studies; and his brother, Frederick (1833–1920), was an artist and expert on medieval costume and design.

== Later life and career ==
Weekes appears to have used his middle name, William, for all but formal purposes. He lived and worked for most of his life in London, at 21 Oppidans Road, Primrose Hill. In 1865, he married artist Caroline Anne Henshaw (born ca. 1844), of Hammersmith.

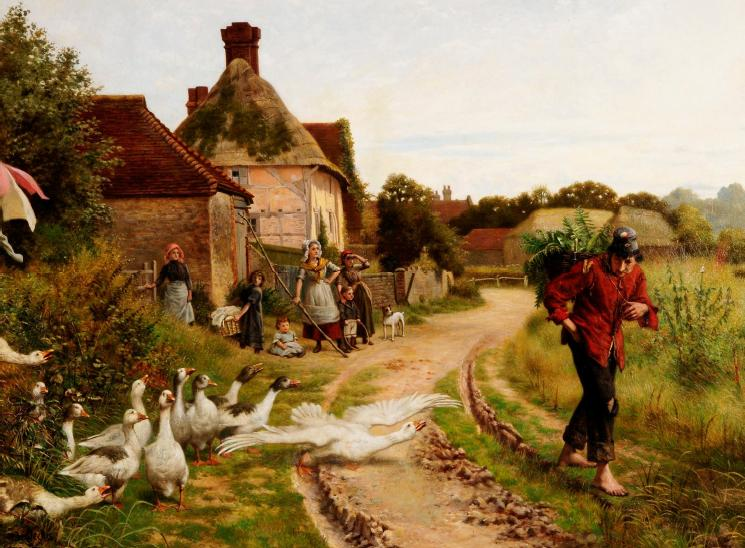
"Suspicion (ca. 1900)", oil-on-canvas

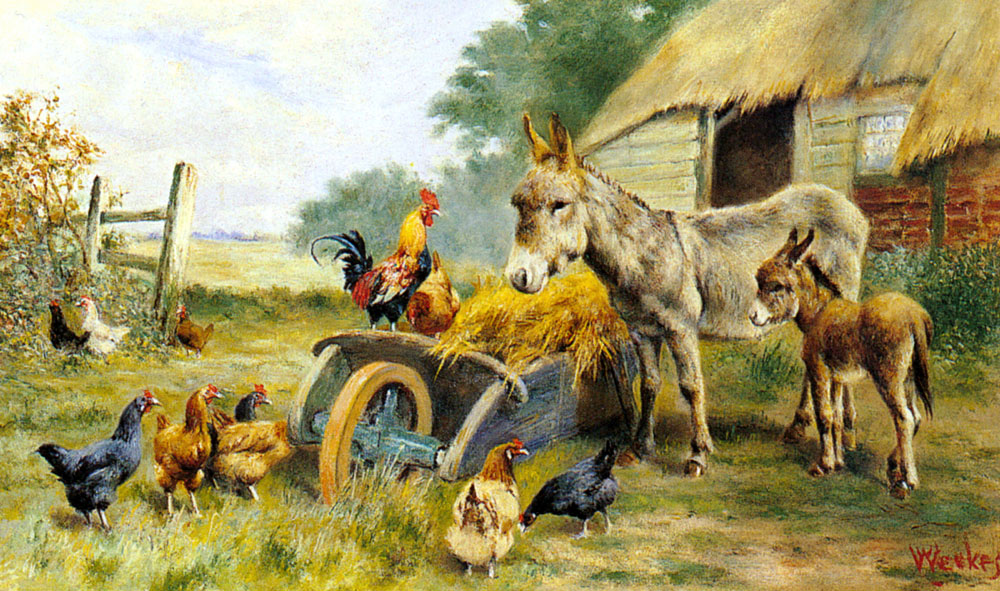
"Fowl Talk", oil-on-canvas

Weekes' signature

Known as an animal and genre painter of the Victorian Neoclassical style, Weekes' work was popular, and helped expand 19th century animal painting from its traditional role of simply recording beasts into a way of reflecting human life. He frequently personified animals and placed them in situations particular to humans. His work shows a sensitive understanding of his subject matter, and part of his success in capturing the peaceful country atmosphere depicted in so many of his paintings lay in his affection for it. He was greatly influenced by one of the foremost animal painters of the nineteenth century, Sir Edwin Henry Landseer.

Weekes contributed illustrations for The Illustrated London News in 1883, and exhibited extensively in various London and provincial galleries. His works were well received - although not by everyone: a contemporary wit described his paintings as “Weekes' Weak Squeaks”.

His works were alternatively signed with the initials 'WW' (sometimes overlaid), 'W. Weekes', 'William Weekes', 'Herbert William Weekes', 'H.W. Weekes', 'H. Weekes', and simply 'Weekes'. They were exhibited in a variety of venues from 1864 to 1904, with frequencies as follows:

- Royal Academy (59)
- Walker Art Gallery, Liverpool (15)
- Royal Society of British Artists (10)
- Royal Institute of Oil Painters (8)
- Royal Birmingham Society of Artists (6)
- Arthur Tooth & Sons (3)
- Manchester City Art Gallery (3)
- Royal Glasgow Institute of the Fine Arts (2)
- Fine Art Society (1)
- Grosvenor Gallery (1)

Weekes died on 21 November 1914 and was buried on 28 November in Hampstead Cemetery (West Hampstead) - the grave is in Section C11 Grave 145, the service was performed by the Vicar of St Luke's Church Hampstead.

== Works ==
This is an inexhaustive list of Weekes' paintings, primarily done in oil on canvas:

- Acquainted With Whoa
- A Meeting of the Savants
- Anticipation
- An Appeal to the Benevolent
- The Apple Picker Takes A Tumble
- An Appreciative Audience
- The Avenged
- Barnyard Friends
- Best of Friends
- A Bone of Contention
- The Blockade
- A Captive Audience
- Christmas Greetings
- Cold As Charity
- Congratulations
- Consulting the Oracle
- A Critic
- Court of Arbitration
- Darby and Joan
- Curiosity
- The Disputed Gate
- A Donkey and Geese Beside a Wheelbarrow
- The Eviction
- Farmyard Friends
- Feeding the Pigs
- Feeding Time
- A Friendly Gathering
- FowlTalk
- Fox Terrier
- A Giant Snowball
- Giving Way
- A Glimpse of the News
- Going to the Dogs
- The Good and the Bad Little Pig
- Good Friends
- Good Taste
- The Grand Procession
- In Great Difficulties
- The Guardian of the Greens
- Guarding the Chicks
- Guilty Conscience
- The Haggle
- How Dare You
- An Intruder
- I Smell a Rat
- Kennel Companions
- The Little Calf
- A Little Girl Feeding Geese
- The Low Comedian's Reception
- Mother and Foal
- Music Hath Charms aka Music To Their Ears
- My Lady's at Home
- Not One of Us
- Outnumbered
- Patience is a virtue
- The Patient and the Quacks
- The Pawnbrokers
- The Pig's Picnic
- Piping the Piggies
- Portrait of a Peasant Woman
- Prattlers and Cracklers
- Pride and Humility
- Quiet!
- The Sermon
- A Siesta
- A Snap for the Lot
- A Spaniel Puppy
- Stable Companions
- Unpleasant for Both Parties
- Street Acrobats
- A Stump Oration
- Suspicion
- A Sweet Thing
- Taunting the Geese
- Teaching the Puppy New Tricks
- A Terrier
- A Territorial Dispute
- This Comes Hopping You Are Well
- A Tug o War
- Trespassers
- Two of his Flock
- Two Donkeys and a Carrion Crow
- Two Smooth-Coated Fox Terriers
- The Unruly Mob
- The Unruly Neighbours
- Unwelcome Guest
- An Unusual Visitor
- An Urban Council
- A Visitor
- Waiting Is a Virtue
- Waiting our Turn
- Washer Woman and Two Dandies
- A Watchful Eye
- A Wee Bit Frightened
- Where Are They?
- Which Way To Market?
- Which Way to Cork?
- You Are Sitting in My Nest
