= Charles Handley-Read =

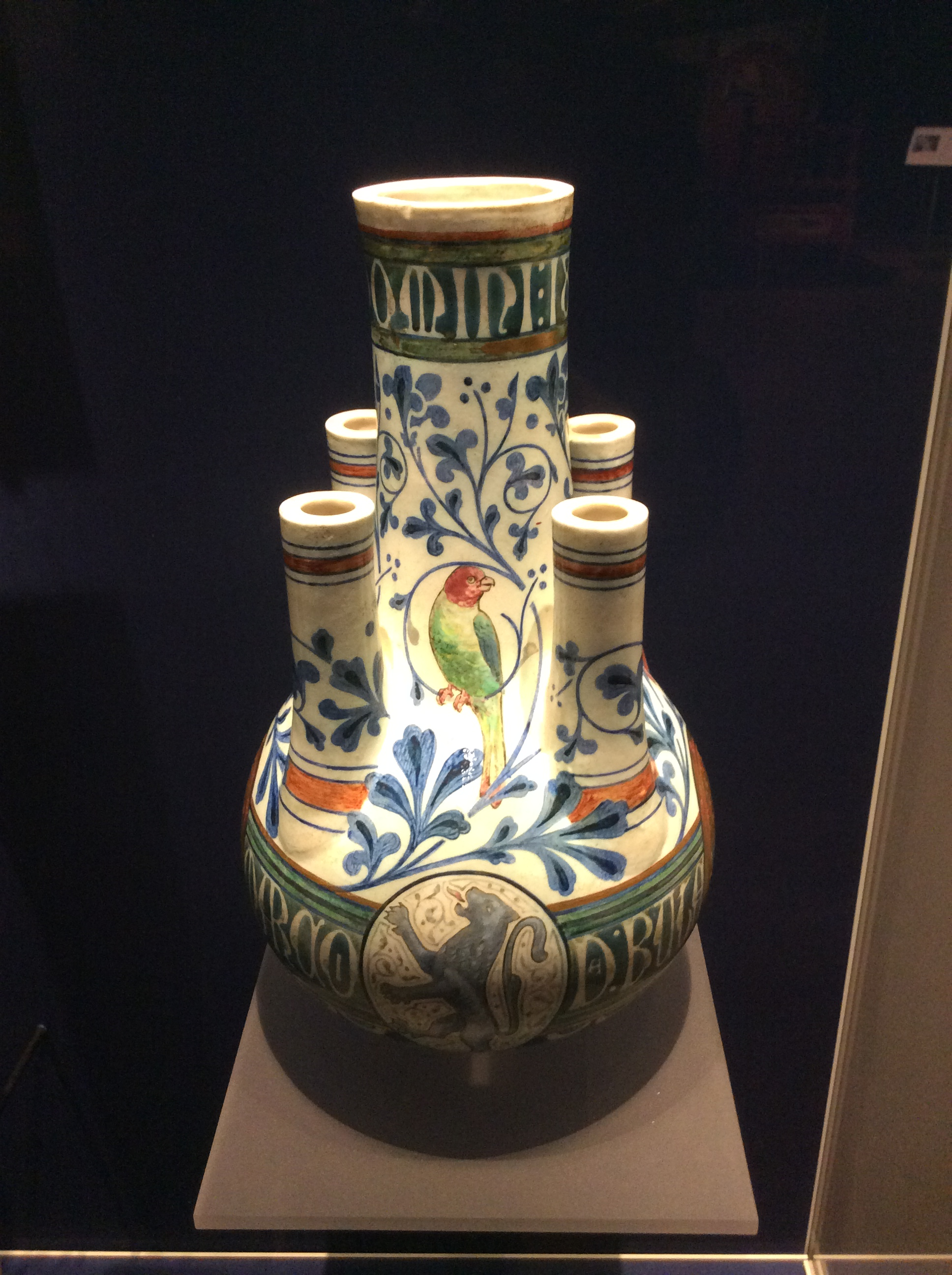
- One of four tulip vases designed by William Burges for the Summer Smoking Room at Cardiff Castle. Handley-Read's vase is now in The Higgins Art Gallery & Museum.
- Born: 21 April 1916; Steyning, Sussex
- Died: 17 October 1971 (aged 55); London
- Education: Bryanston School; St Catharine's College, Cambridge
- Occupations: Architectural historian and collector
- Spouse: Lavinia Stainton

Charles Harry Ralph Handley-Read (4 April 1916 – 17 October 1971) was an architectural writer and collector and the first serious 20th-century student of the work of William Burges, "a pioneer in Burges studies who was the first to assess the historical brilliance of Burges as gesamtkunstwerk architect and designer."

== Life and works ==
Handley-Read was born in Steyning, Sussex in 1916 to a father, Harry Handley Read (1870–1935), who was a magazine illustrator and military artist and a mother Eva Handley Read (1878–1965). who, beside being one of the first qualified female doctors and dental surgeons was a militant suffragette. In the thirties, he went up to St Catharine's College, Cambridge to read architecture, and upon graduation became art master at his old school, Bryanston. His career was interrupted by the Second World War during which, as a conscientious objector, he worked at the epileptic colony at Lingfield, developing art therapy for children.

On the resumption of his career, Handley-Read's architectural passion was Modernism and in 1951 he completed his monograph on "The Art of Wyndham Lewis." However, the subsequent, and very different, course of his life was set when, in 1952, he saw the Exhibition of Victorian and Edwardian Decorative Arts at the Victoria and Albert Museum.

Following the exhibition, and his marriage to Lavinia Staunton, a devotee of Victorian sculpture, Handley-Read "pinned all his hopes and dreams on one all-consuming passion, the work of William Burges." In the period between the First World War and the 1960s Victorian architecture reached its nadir of appreciation; "at best an unhappy interlude between Neo-Classicism and Modernism; at worst a period of grotesque bad taste, associated with religious cranks like Pugin and Socialist crackpots like Ruskin and William Morris." The desire for, and consequently the prices of, the Victorian decorative arts were therefore at an all-time low. Handley-Read and his wife, aided by a considerable inheritance, began to collect on an increasingly gargantuan scale. While his collection expanded, his ability to write about the works he bought did not: "A lifetime spent struggling to write produced just seventeen articles." Accepting his own inability to undertake Burges's biography, Handley-Read wrote to a friend, Joseph Mordaunt Crook; "Now look. You have just edited Eastlake's Gothic Revival...with complete success. You are well soaked in John Patrick Crichton-Stuart, 3rd Marquess of Bute. You know all about Smirke...why not do William Burges?...partnership is less than I am looking for. I want to hand the job over."

On 17 October 1971, at 82 Ladbroke Road, Notting Hill, Handley-Read committed suicide. He left a substantial estate, valued for probate at £161,768. His wife Lavinia killed herself on 9 December of the same year. These events shocked their friends; the architectural historian Mark Girouard, who was close to them both, wrote, "they loved each other, had enough money, a pleasant home, plenty of friends, and had achieved something remarkable."

In an article he wrote in Country Life in March 1972, Girouard described his visits to their London home to view their collection. Of Charles and Lavinia, he recalled "two highly strung, vulnerable and complicated people who for 18 years had supported each other". Their collection of Victorian artefacts was broken up at sale. Many pieces were bought by major museums such as the Victoria & Albert Museum and Birmingham Museum & Art Gallery, as well as private collectors. The largest part of the collection to stay together was the 200 plus pieces purchased by The Higgins Art Gallery & Museum, Bedford, including William Burges's own bed and dressing table.

Handley-Read's notes on William Burges were passed to Joseph Mordaunt Crook and became the basis of his seminal work on Burges, William Burges and the High Victorian Dream. The book received very positive reviews and was instrumental in establishing Burges's rehabilitation. A rare criticism is contained in a review written by Anthony Symondson in 1982. Symondson's critique relates not to Burges, but rather to Crook's portrait of Handley-Read; "those of us who knew (him) do not find him in Dr Crook's prelude, however cleverly written and closely researched."

== Sources ==
- Crook, J. Mordaunt (1981). William Burges and the High Victorian Dream. John Murray. ISBN 978-0-7195-3822-3.
- Girouard, Mark (16 March 1972). "Two Collectors Extraordinary: Charles and Lavinia Handley-Read". Country Life.
- — (2017). Friendships. London: Wilmington Square Books. ISBN 978-1908-52496-6.
- Lawrence, David; Wilson, Ann (2006). The Cathedral of Saint Fin Barre at Cork: William Burges in Ireland. Four Courts Press. ISBN 978-1-84682-023-6.
