= Zodiac settle =

Piece of furniture by William Burges

Zodiac Settle
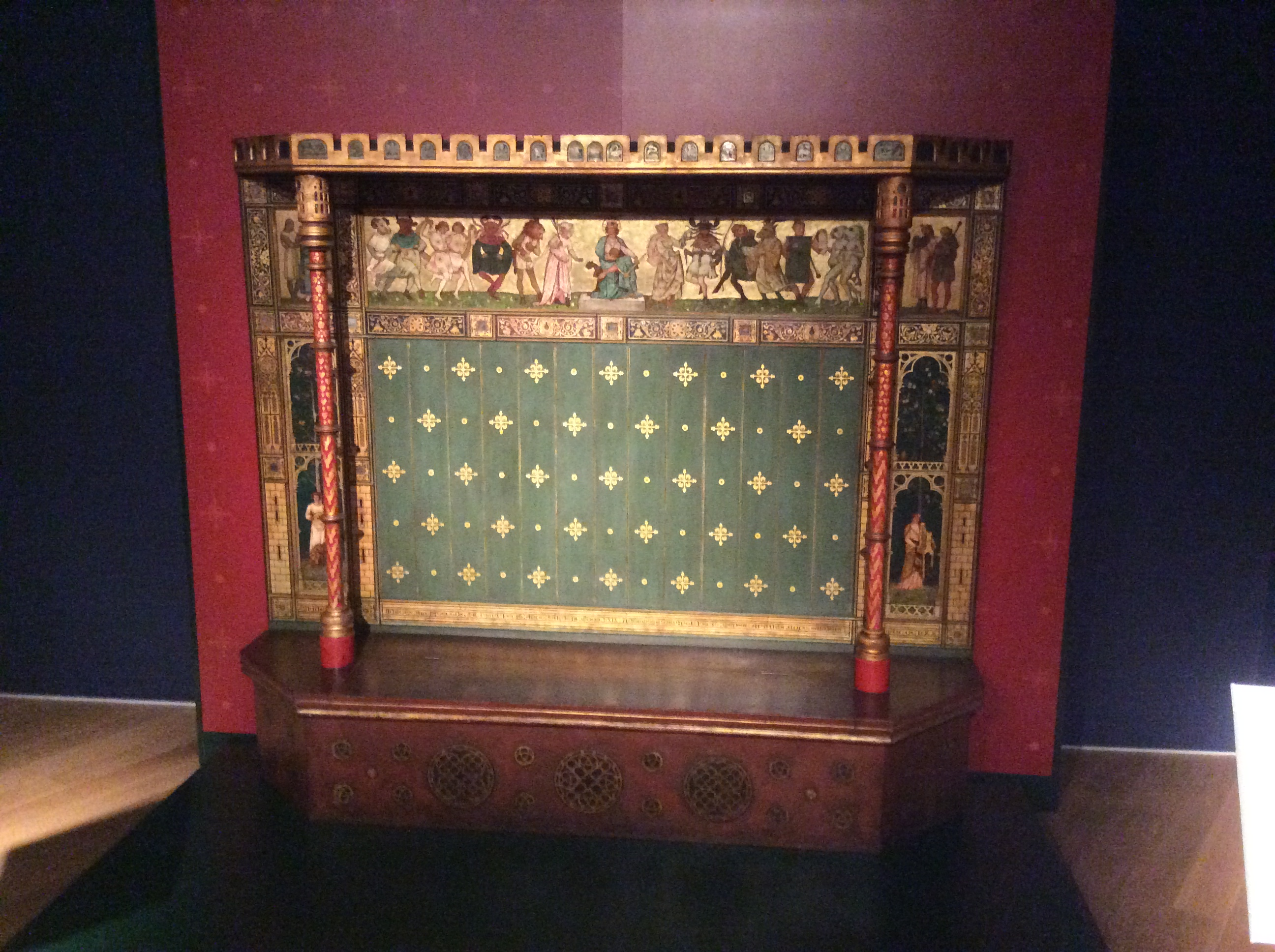
- Zodiac settle
- Designer: William Burges
- Date: 1869-1871
- Made in: London, England
- Materials: Oak, carved, painted and gilt
- Style / tradition: High Victorian Gothic, Pre-Raphaelite
- Sold by: Auberon Waugh
- Height: 187.5 cm
- Width: 216 cm
- Depth: 51 cm
- Collection: The Higgins Art Gallery & Museum, Bedford

The Zodiac settle is a piece of painted furniture designed by the English architect and designer William Burges and made between 1869 and 1871. A wooden settle designed with Zodiac themes, it was made for Burges' rooms at Buckingham Street, and later moved to the drawing room of The Tower House, the home that he designed for himself in Holland Park. Burges desired to fill his home with furniture "covered with paintings, both ornaments and subjects; it not only did its duty as furniture, but spoke and told a story." At one stage the poet John Betjeman gave the settle to the novelist Evelyn Waugh, and it is now in the collection of The Higgins Art Gallery & Museum in Bedford.

== Design ==
The settle is a wooden bench with a canopy. It is painted and stenciled, with inlaid pieces of glass crystal and vellum. In 1865, Burges wrote, "it is almost impossible for us to conceive the effect of a first-class piece of medieval sacred furniture covered with burnished gilding engraved and punched into patterns enriched with paintings by an artist like Giotto, and glittering with mosaics of gilt and coloured glass."

The only settle that Burges created, its form has been likened to a day bed of the Italian Renaissance. Burges scorned his typical French Gothic influences in his design for the settle, being influenced instead by English Gothic sources as well as the Italian Renaissance. It is decorated with a central painted panel, painted by Henry Stacy Marks. The panel features an enthroned sun, with the Zodiac signs dancing around it. The signs of Leo, Virgo, Cancer, Gemini, Taurus and Aries dance on the right, and Libra, Scorpio, Sagittarius, Capricorn, Aquarius and Pisces are dancing on the left. The planets of the Solar System are depicted as musicians on one side of the settle, with Saint Cecilia and another female figure on the other side. It is inscribed in Latin "BURGES ARCHITECTUS ME FIERI FECIT ANNO SALUTIS MDCCCLXIX AUTEM ME DEPINCI FECIT APRILIS SALUTIS MDCCCLXX" ("Burges the Architect had me made in the year of salvation 1869 however he had me painted in April of the year of salvation 1870").

The maker of the settle is unknown; it is believed to be either Harland and Fisher, who had made earlier pieces of furniture for Burges, or John Walden, who made the guest bedroom furniture for the Tower House. The settle featured in photographs published in 1885, taken in Buckingham Street by Burges's brother-in-law, Richard Popplewell Pullan. The settle is shown with an embroidered panel and three seat cushions.

== History ==
Designed by Burges for himself, the Zodiac settle was originally placed in his rooms at 15 Buckingham Street on The Strand in London, and later moved to The Tower House in Holland Park around 1878, when Burges first occupied the house. The Tower House was designed by Burges by himself. Burges continued to work on Tower House until his death in 1881, and the Zodiac settle was placed opposite the drawing room windows in Tower House. The decoration of the drawing room remained unfinished upon Burges's death. The Tower House was subsequently owned by Burges's brother-in-law, Pullan, and then by Colonel T. H. Minshall in the 1920s. Minshall offered the Zodiac settle and other items from Tower House for sale in 1933, but the settle remained unsold.

The Tower House was owned by Colonel E. R. B. Graham and his wife from 1933. The English poet John Betjeman, a champion of the architecture of the Victorian Gothic Revival, later befriended the Grahams and Betjeman was given the remaining two-year lease on the Tower House and some of the furniture upon Mrs Graham's death in 1962. Betjeman subsequently gave the Zodiac settle as well as the "Narcissus washstand" and the "Philosophy cabinet" from Tower House to his friend, the novelist Evelyn Waugh. It is believed Betjeman gave them to Waugh to appease his wife, Penelope, who did not share his appreciation of Gothic Revival painted furniture. The "Philosophy cabinet" is now in the private collection of Andrew Lloyd Webber and the "Narcissus washstand" in the collection of The Higgins Art Gallery & Museum in Bedford. Waugh mentioned the settle in a letter to his daughter Margaret FitzHerbert in July 1965. Waugh wrote that the settle was "looking very well between the windows of the morning-room". The settle descended through the Waugh family before being acquired by The Higgins Art Gallery & Museum in 2011.

=== 2011 acquisition ===
A temporary export bar was placed on the settle by the Reviewing Committee on the Export of Works of Art and Objects of Cultural Interest (RCEWA). The RCEWA is part of the Arts Council England and advise the Secretary of State for Culture, Media and Sport on matters concerning the exporting of objects of national interest. It was subsequently acquired by The Higgins Art Gallery & Museum in Bedford after a £480,000 grant from the National Heritage Memorial Fund (NHMF), £190,000 from the Trustees of the Cecil Higgins Art Gallery and £180,000 from the Art Fund.

== Sources ==
- U K Stationery Office (2011). Export of Objects of Cultural Interest 2010/11: 1 May 2010 - 30 April 2011. The Stationery Office. ISBN 978-0-10-851100-4.
- Wilson, A.N. (2011). Betjeman. Random House. ISBN 978-1-4464-9305-2.
