= Smirke =

Smirke is a surname. Notable people with the surname include:

- Charlie Smirke, British jockey
- Edward Smirke (1795–1875), English lawyer and antiquary
- Robert Smirke (painter) (1753–1845)
- Robert Smirke (architect) (1780–1867), son of Robert Smirke the painter
- Sydney Smirke, son of Robert Smirke the painter
