= The Red Bed =

Piece of painted furniture

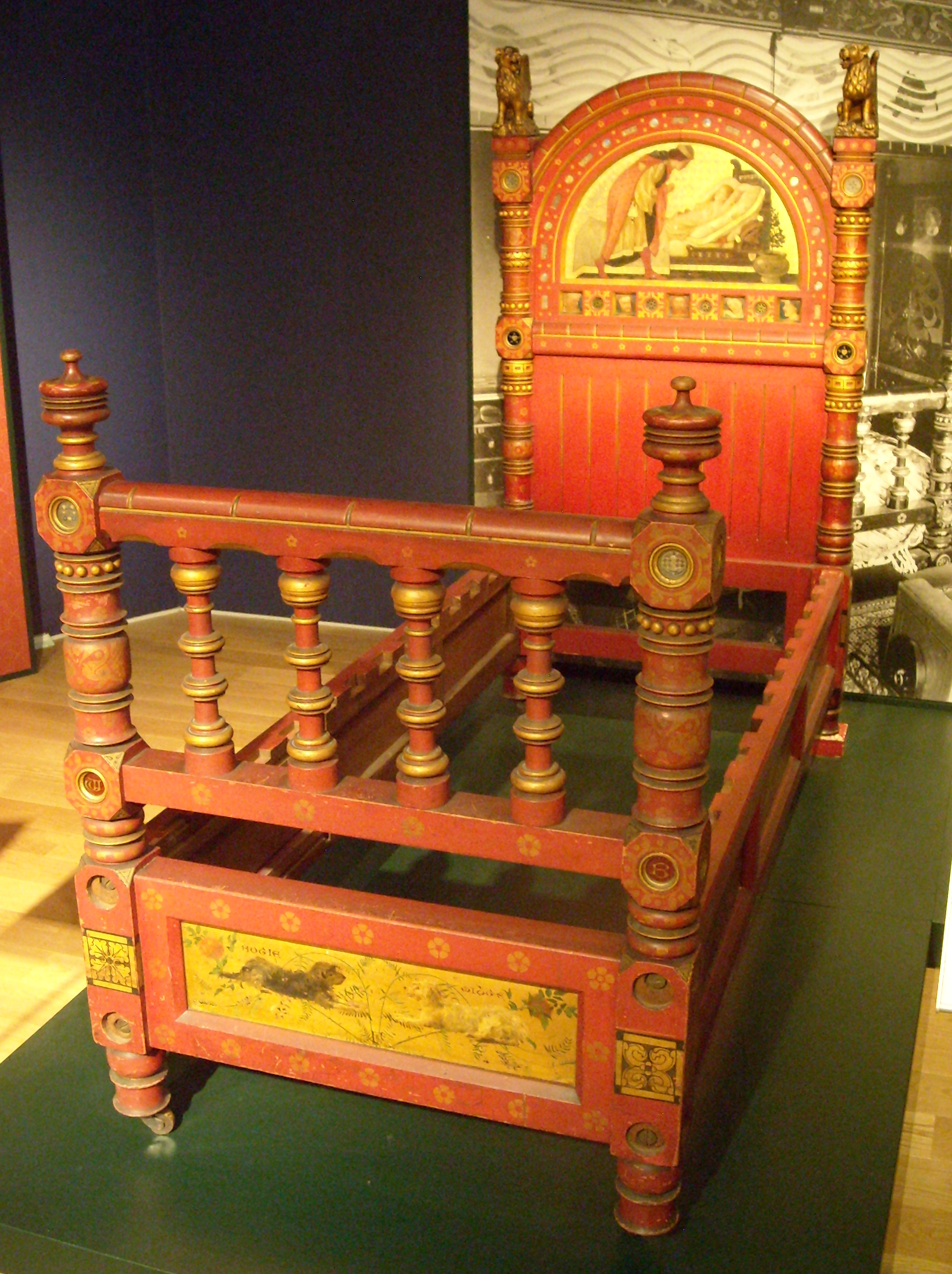
- The Red Bed, in which Burges died on 20 April 1881
- Designer: William Burges
- Date: 1865-1867
- Made in: London, England
- Materials: Mahogany, carved and painted
- Style / tradition: High Victorian Gothic, Pre-Raphaelite
- Collection: The Higgins Art Gallery & Museum, Bedford

The Red Bed is a piece of painted furniture designed by the English architect and designer William Burges made between 1865 and 1867. Built of mahogany, painted blood red and decorated with imagery of the Sleeping Beauty fairy tale, it was made for Burges's rooms at Buckingham Street, and later moved to his bedroom at The Tower House, the home he designed for himself in Holland Park. Burges wanted to fill his home with furniture decorated with paintings; they served not only their obvious practical purposes, “but spoke and told a story”. After catching a chill while engaged on works for the Marquess of Bute at Cardiff, Burges returned to the Tower House and died in the Red Bed, aged 53, on 20 April 1881.

The bed is now part of the collection of Burges furniture at The Higgins Art Gallery & Museum in Bedford.
