= Golden Bed =

Furniture by William Burges

The Golden Bed
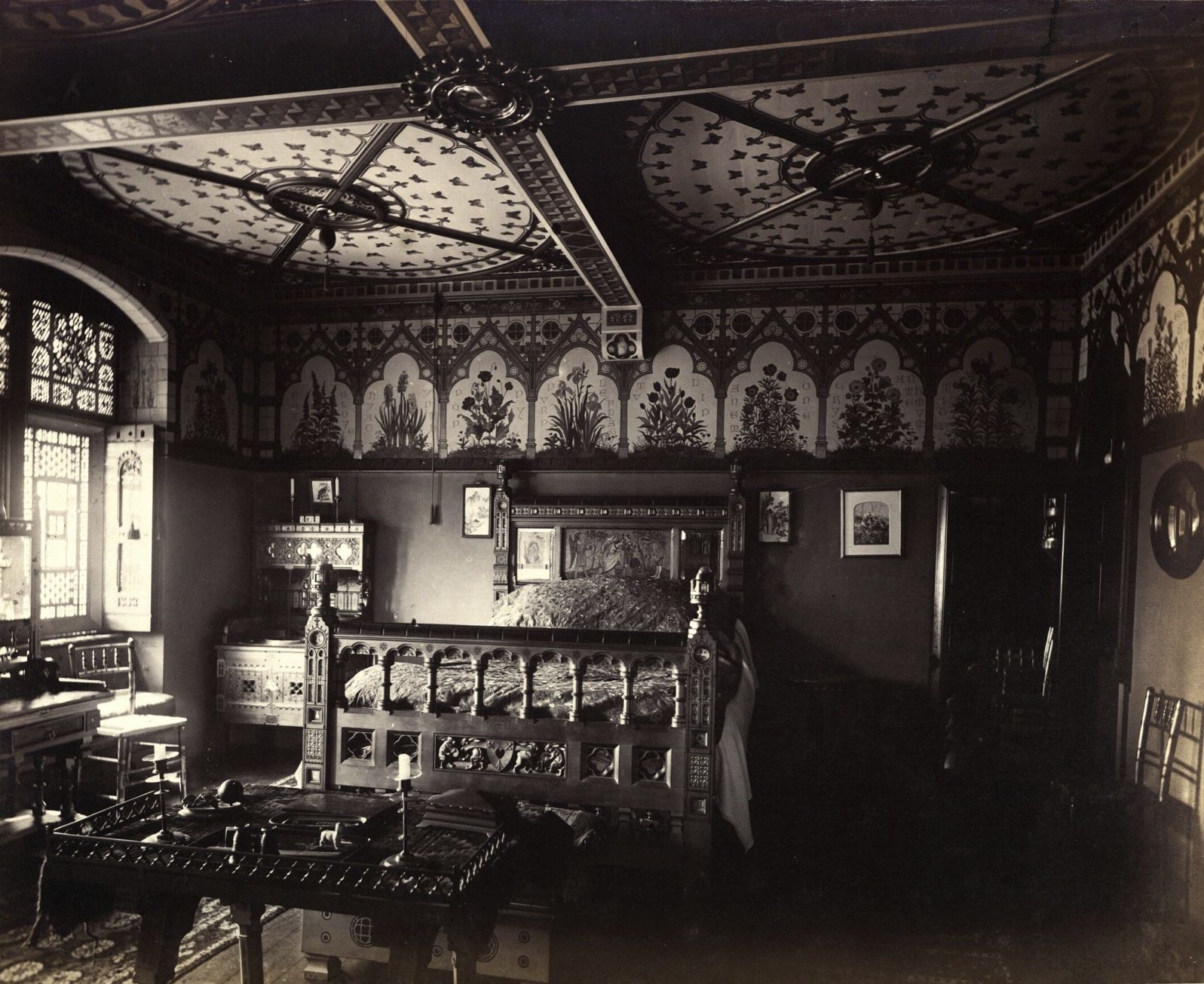
- The Golden Bed in its original location, the Guest Bedroom at The Tower House
- Designer: William Burges
- Date: 1879
- Made in: London, England
- Materials: Mahogany & pine, painted and gilt
- Style / tradition: High Victorian Gothic, Pre-Raphaelite
- Height: 193 cm (76 in)
- Width: 157 cm (62 in)
- Depth: 228 cm (90 in)
- Collection: Victoria and Albert Museum

The Golden Bed is a bed designed by the English architect and designer William Burges in 1879 for the guest bedroom of the home that he designed for himself in Holland Park, The Tower House. It is now in the collection of the Victoria & Albert Museum (V&A) in South Kensington. The bed was made by John Walden and carved by Thomas Nicholls. The painting in the central panel of the headboard was executed by Henry Holiday, and the motifs and figures on the bed painted by Fred Weekes. The bed is made from polished hardwood, mahogany and pine.

The theme for the guest room has been variously described as 'The Earth and Her Productions' and 'Vita Nova' ('New Life'). The Golden Bed matched the rest of the furniture designed for the guest bedroom, in keeping with the room's decorative scheme.

== Design ==
The Golden Bed is a large bed, measuring 2.28 metres (7.5 ft) long, 1.93 metres (6.3 ft) high and 1.57 metres (5.2 ft) wide. It is made from wood, gilded gold. The bed is decorated with carvings and 'fragments of illuminated manuscripts under glass and rock crystal'. Two mirrors are inset into the headboard, which features a painting by Thomas Weekes of the Judgement of Paris at its centre. The three gods in the 'Judgement of Paris' are wearing clothes of the 13th-century, with Mercury standing to the left of Paris, with Venus bowing to Paris on the right. The painting had previously been part of a larger painted panel at Burges' rooms in Buckingham Street, where he had lived before Tower House. The sideboards of the bed are ornamented with glass covering pieces of illuminated vellum and fragments of textiles. Grotesque figures, of a female and male, feature in the side brackets at the head of the bed. The bed head and foot posts are surmounted by half orbs of rock crystal.

The foot of the bed is inscribed with the Latin phrase 'VITA NOVA' ('New Life'), with the posts of the bed inscribed 'WILLIAM BURGES ME FIERI FECIT' ('William Burges Made Me') on the right, and 'ANNO DOMINI MDCCCLXXIX' ('In the Year of Our Lord 1879') on the left.

== History ==
The estimate book Burges used for Tower House records the bed on 12 March 1879 as costing £39 13s (equivalent to £4,014 in 2025). Thomas Nicholls carving for the bed is marked by a payment of £15 15s in June that year (equivalent to £1,544 in 2025).

From 1952 to 1953 the Exhibition of Victorian and Edwardian Decorative Arts was held at the V&A, at which the Golden Bed and an accompanying washstand, also from the guest bedroom at The Tower House, were lent for display. Oliver Poole, 1st Baron Poole was originally asked to lend the bed but Poole subsequently requested that Colonel T.H. Minshall be acknowledged as the owner. Minshall had owned Tower House in the 1920s. Poole and his mother, Mrs. Minshall, later agreed to donate the bed and washstand to the V&A in the name of Colonel Minshall.

In 2002 the Golden Bed was lent to Knightshayes Court in Tiverton, Devon, by the V&A. Knightshayes Court had been built by Burges from 1867 to 1874. The bed joined a wardrobe designed by Burges on loan from Tower House in a newly created 'Burges room' at Knightshayes Court.
