= Narcissus washstand =

1867 furniture piece by William Burges

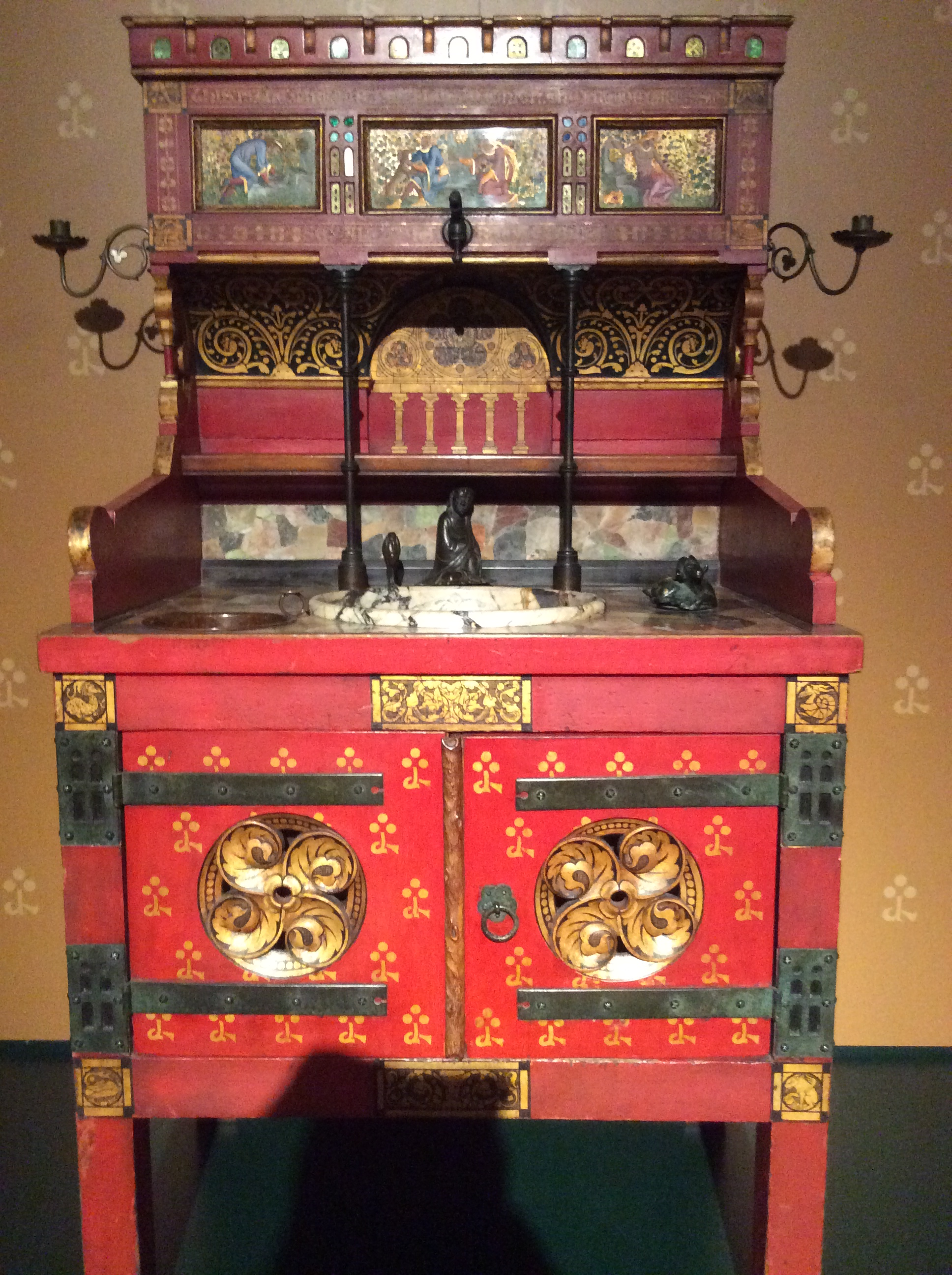
- Designer: William Burges
- Date: 1867
- Made in: London, England
- Materials: Oak, carved, painted and gilt
- Style / tradition: High Victorian Gothic, Pre-Raphaelite
- Sold by: Auberon Waugh
- Collection: The Higgins Art Gallery & Museum, Bedford

The Narcissus washstand is a piece of painted furniture made by the Victorian architect and designer William Burges in 1867. It was originally made for Burges's set of rooms at Buckingham Street and subsequently moved to his bedroom at The Tower House, the house he designed for himself in Holland Park in London. John Betjeman, later Poet Laureate and a leading champion of the art and architecture of the Victorian Gothic Revival, was left the remaining lease on the Tower House, including some of the furniture, by E. R. B. Graham in 1961. He gave the washstand, which he found in a second-hand shop in Lincoln, to the novelist Evelyn Waugh who featured it in his 1957 novel, The Ordeal of Gilbert Pinfold, mirroring a real-life incident when Waugh, in the grip of bromide poisoning, became convinced that an ornamental tap was missing from the washstand. (Note: In a letter to John Betjeman written from his home in Gloucestershire, Piers Court and dated 29 December 1953, Waugh described what he believed was the missing tap, and gave a sign of his imminent breakdown: "The missing organ is something quite other - either a hallucination of mine or an act of theft... As I remember there was an ornamental bronze pipe which led from the dragons mouth to the bowl below.")

The washstand is part of the collection of The Higgins Art Gallery & Museum in Bedford. The Higgins museum acquired it from Auberon Waugh in 1994 for £240,435, with £50,000 of the purchase price provided by the National Art Collections Fund.

== Sources ==
- Crook, J. Mordaunt (1981a). William Burges and the High Victorian Dream. John Murray. ISBN 978-0-7195-3822-3.
- Waugh, Evelyn (1995) [1980]. Mark Amory (ed.). The Letters of Evelyn Waugh. London: Phoenix. ISBN 1-85799-245-8.
- Wilson, A.N. (2011). Betjeman. Random House. ISBN 978-1-4464-9305-2.
