= Frederick Smallfield =

English painter

Frederick Smallfield ARWS
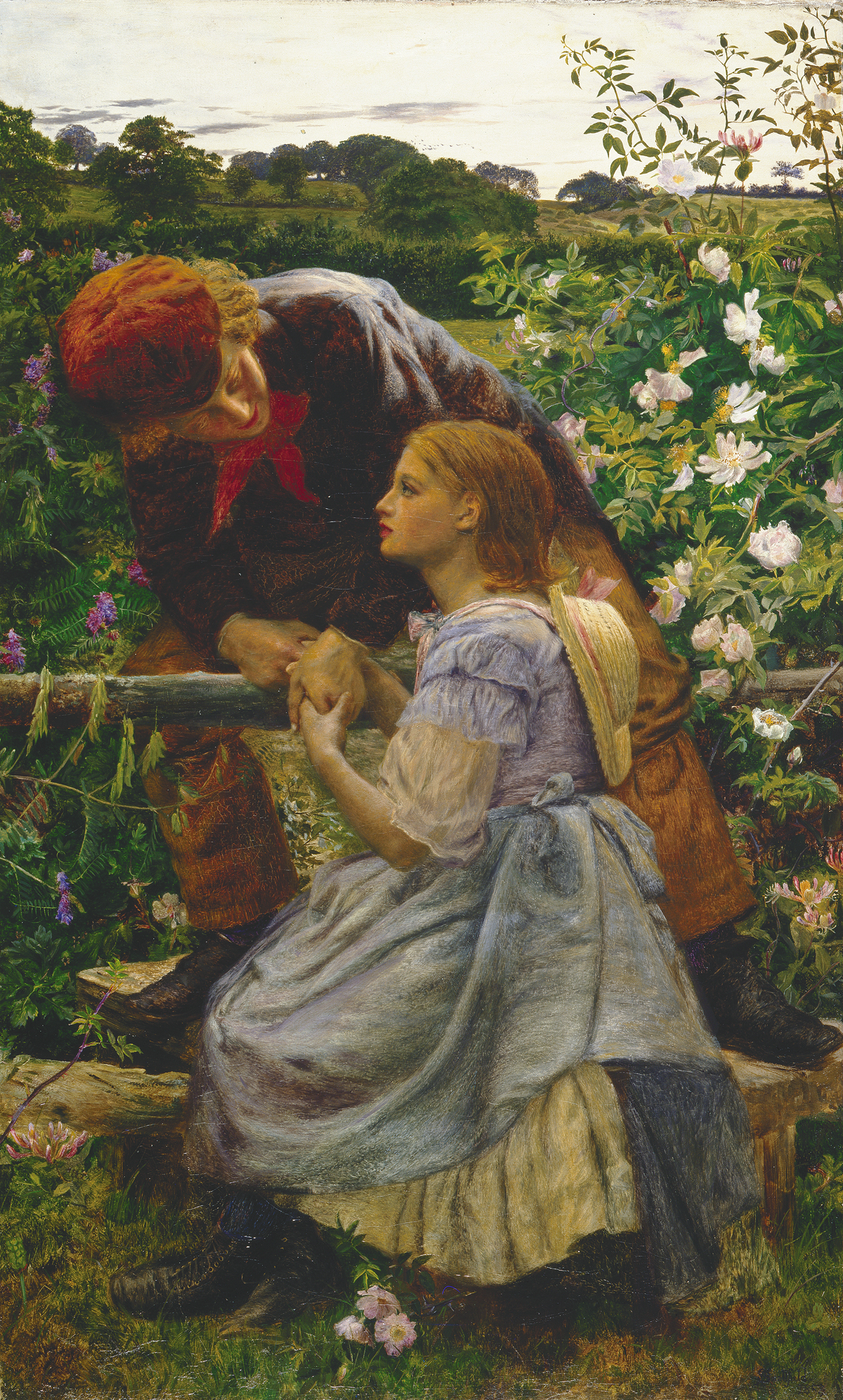
- The artist's Early Lovers, 1857
- Born: 16 October 1829; Hackney, London
- Died: 10 September 1915 (aged 85); Finchley, London
- Education: Royal Academy Schools
- Occupation: Artist

Frederick Smallfield ARWS (16 October 1829 – 10 September 1915) was an English Victorian painter in oils and watercolour, whose work shows a Pre-Raphaelite influence.

Smallfield trained at the Royal Academy Schools in the late 1840s, at the same time as various members of the Pre-Raphaelite Brotherhood, although he seems not to have been closely associated with them.

In 1858, Smallfield's watercolours were praised in Academy Notes by John Ruskin. In 1860, he was elected Associate of the Watercolour Society (ARWS). He contributed two illustrations, The Shoeblack and A Christmas Invitation, to Passages From Modern English Poets (1862), one called A Father's Lament to Robert Aris Willmott's English Sacred Poetry of the Sixteenth, Seventeenth, Eighteenth, and Nineteenth Centuries (1863) and another to The Industrial Arts of the Nineteenth Century at the Great Exhibition MDCCCLI by Sir Matthew Digby Wyatt, published by Day & Son, London, 1851–1853.

He exhibited works in oil at the Royal Academy until the late 1870s.

His work is now in the collections of the Royal Institution of Cornwall (The Ringers of Launcells Tower, 1887), Manchester City Galleries (Early Lovers, 1857), and the Atkinson Art Gallery at Southport (The Lost Glove, 1858). Some of his drawings are in the Victoria and Albert Museum, including a sketch of a wall decoration by John Gregory Crace.
