= J. Mordaunt Crook =

Joseph Mordaunt Crook CBE FBA FSA
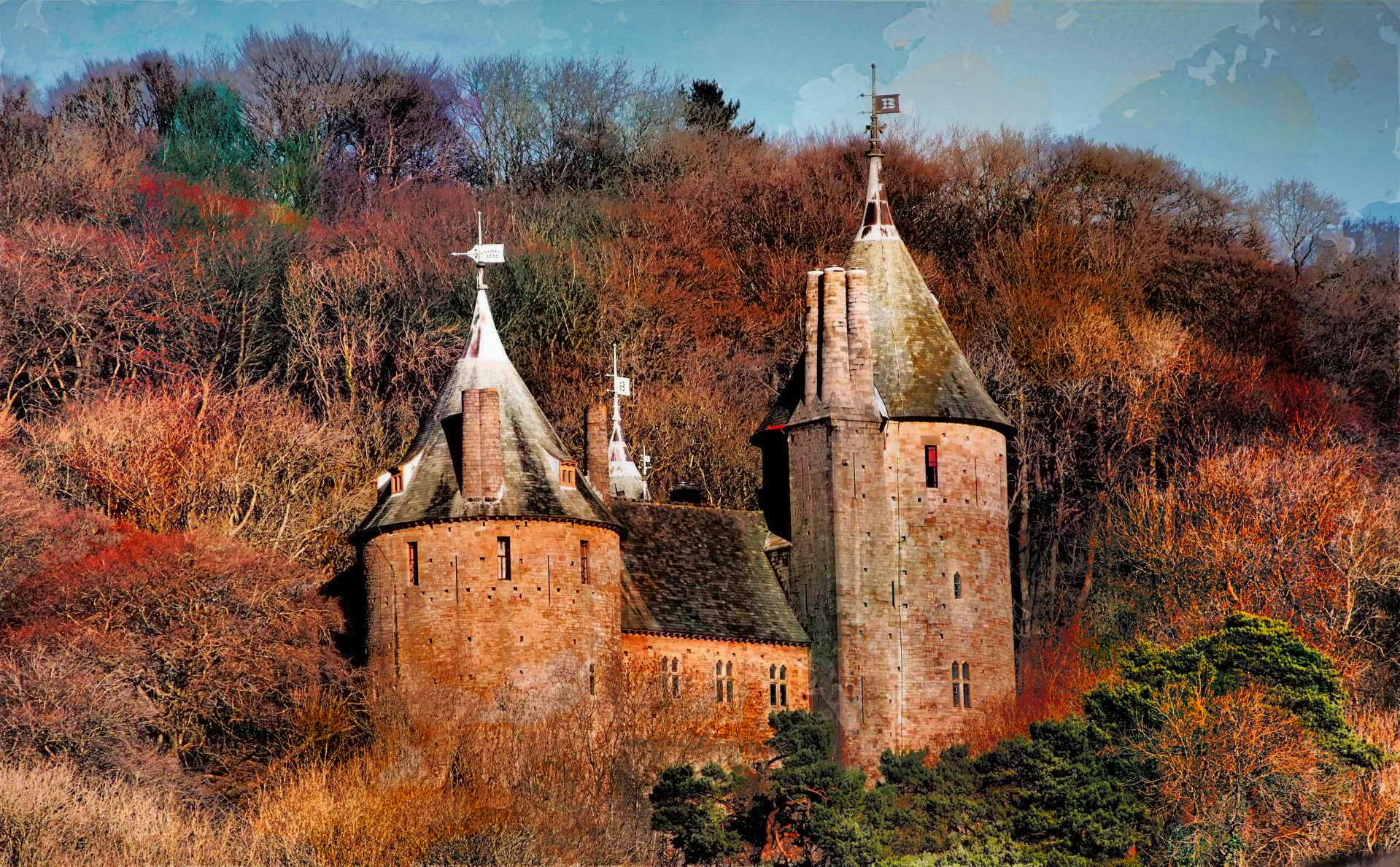
- Mordaunt Crook's study of William Burges re-established the latter's reputation
- Born: 27 February 1937 (age 89); London, England
- Education: Wimbledon College, University of Oxford
- Occupation: Architectural historian
- Notable work: William Burges and the High Victorian Dream
- Spouse(s): (m.1) Margaret Mullholland, (m.2) Susan Mayor

Joseph Mordaunt Crook, CBE, FBA, FSA (born 27 February 1937), generally known as J. Mordaunt Crook, is an English architectural historian and specialist on the Georgian and Victorian periods. He is an authority on the life and work of the Victorian architect William Burges, his biography published in 1981, and reissued in 2013, has been described as "one of the most substantial studies of any Victorian architect".

== Positions and memberships held ==
- Slade Professor of Fine Art, University of Oxford (1979–1980)
- Professor of Architectural History, Royal Holloway College, (University of London), (1981–1999)
- President of the Society of Architectural Historians of Great Britain
- Supernumerary Fellow of Brasenose College, Oxford
- Member of the Supervisory Committee of the Oxford Dictionary of National Biography
- Council Member of the Society of Antiquaries of London
- Council Member of the Victorian Society of Great Britain
- Vice Chairman Westminster Abbey Fabric Commission

== Honours ==
- Commander of the Order of the British Empire (CBE) (2003)
- Alice Davis Hitchcock Medallion, (1974), Society of Architectural Historians of Great Britain
- Fellow of the British Academy (FBA)

== Selected works ==
- The History of the King's Works volumes V-VI (1972-6) HMSO
- The British Museum: a Case-study in Architectural Politics (1972), Pelican
- The Greek Revival: Neo-Classical Attitudes in British Architecture 1760-1870 (1972/revised 1995) John Murray
- The Reform Club (1973) article for and published by the Reform Club
- Strawberry Hill Revisited Reprints from Country Life of 7/14/21 June 1973
- William Burges and the High Victorian Dream (1981) John Murray; revised (2013) Frances Lincoln
- The Strange Genius of William Burges (1981) National Museum of Wales
- Axel Haig and the Victorian Vision of the Middle Ages (with C.A. Lennox-Boyd) (1984) George Allen & Unwin
- John Carter and the Mind of the Gothic Revival (1985) Society of Antiquaries of London, Occasional Papers
- The Dilemma of Style: Architectural Ideas from the Picturesque to the Post-Modern (1989) John Murray
- The Rise of the Nouveaux Riches: Style and Status in Victorian and Edwardian Architecture (1999) John Murray
- London's Arcadia: John Nash and the Planning of Regent's Park (date of publication and publisher unknown)
- The Architect's Secret: Victorian Critics and the Image of Gravity (2003) John Murray
- Brasenose: The Biography of an Oxford College (Oxford: Oxford University Press, 2008)
- Brooks's 1764-2014: The Story of a Whig Club (Edited with Charles Sebag-Montefiore) London: Paul Holberton, 2013

== Sources ==
- Elizabeth Sleeman, ed. (2004). International Who's Who of Authors and Writers. London: Europa Publications. ISBN 1857431790.
- Thevoz, Seth Alexander (2018). Club Government: How the Early Victorian World was Ruled from London Clubs. London: I.B. Tauris. ISBN 9781784538187. OCLC 1030822495.
