= St Peter's Church, Scarborough =

Roman Catholic Church in Scarborough, North Yorkshire, England

St Peter's Church
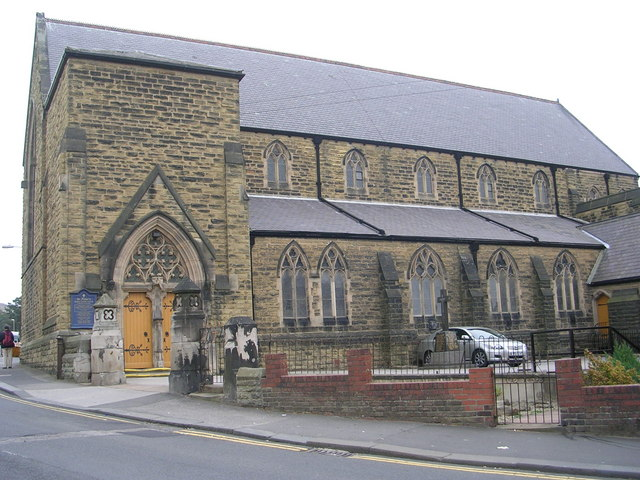
- St Peter's Church
- 54.2863°N 0.3975°W
- OS grid reference: TA 044 890
- Location: Scarborough, North Yorkshire
- Country: England
- Denomination: Roman Catholic
- Website: ScarboroughCatholicParishes.org.uk

History
- Status: Parish church
- Founder: Fr Walker
- Dedication: Saint Peter

Architecture
- Functional status: Active
- Heritage designation: Grade II listed
- Designated: 8 June 1973
- Architect: George Goldie
- Style: Gothic Revival
- Groundbreaking: 3 October 1856
- Completed: 1858

Administration
- Province: Liverpool
- Diocese: Middlesbrough
- Deanery: Central
- Parish: St Peter's, Scarborough

St Peter's Church is a Roman Catholic parish church in Scarborough, North Yorkshire, England. It was built from 1856 to 1858 and designed by George Goldie in the Gothic Revival style. It is located on the corner of Castle Road and Tollergate in the town centre. It is a Grade II listed building.

== History ==
=== Foundation ===
During the Reformation, the local Catholics of Scarborough met in a house in the Westgate part of Scarborough. In 1809, a chapel was built on Auborough Street. In 1835, the Catholic mission in Scarborough was served by a Fr Walker. In 1846, he invited the architect Augustus Pugin to Scarborough so that a new church would be built. However, Pugin did not visit Scarborough.

=== Construction ===
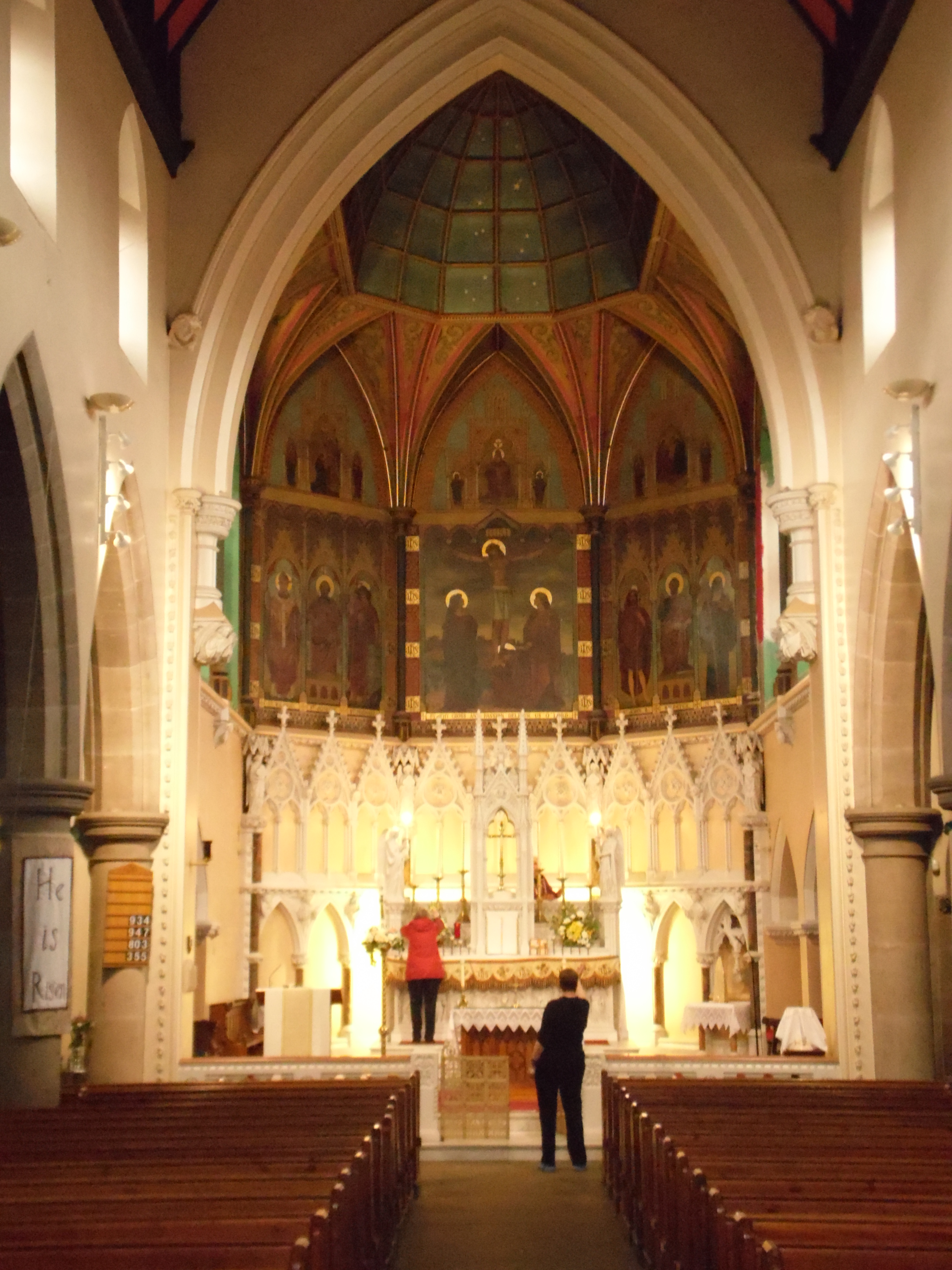
Interior

After Pugin did not visit the town, the architect George Goldie was invited instead. He designed a Gothic Revival style church for the town. Fr Walker initially wanted a church in the Norman Revival style, but was persuaded by Goldie to accept a church in the Gothic Revival style. On 3 October 1856, the foundation stone of the church was laid. In 1858, the church was opened. However, the interior of the church still needed some work, so in 1874 the church was closed to complete the interior before being reopened on 22 July 1874. The organ was made by Foster & Andrews of Hull and rebuilt by Nicholson & Co Ltd. In 1858, 1874 and 1898 stained glass windows were installed in the church and were made by Hardman & Co.

=== Developments ===
As the population of the Scarborough continued to rise in the 20th century, various chapels of ease were built from St Peter's Church to serve the increasing local Catholic congregation. St Edward the Confessor Church was the first Catholic church to be built after St Peter's Church. It is to the south of the town. Plans were underway in 1891 to build the church after Elizabeth Reynard of Sunderlandwick died and gave the land and money for the church. However, nothing done for another 20 years until a Mr Anderson of York gave £1,000 for the church and building work started. On 13 August 1912, the foundation was laid. The church is in the Byzantine Revival style, was designed by a Fr Eugene Roulin of Filey as well as the architectural firm John Petch & Son, and opened in 1914.

In the 1950s, the population increased and St George's Church in Eastfield was also built as a chapel of ease of St Peter's Church. It was built in 1957, cost £15,000, and was enlarged in 1965. In addition, St Joseph's Church was built in Newby and Scalby. Plans for the church started in 1930, land was purchased for it and a temporary building was made in 1949. In 1960, the church was built and cost £35,000. The church was designed by Francis Johnson and is a Grade II listed building.

== Parish ==
The Scarborough parish of St Peter also incorporates the St Edward the Confessor Church and St Joseph's Church in Newby and Scalby, while St George's Church in Eastfield is served from Our Lady and St Peter's Church in Bridlington. St Peter's Church has three Sunday Masses at 5:30 pm on Saturday, 9:30 am in Polish and at 11:30 am on Sunday. St Joseph's Church has one Sunday Mass at 9:30 am. St Edward the Confessor Church has a Mass in Malayalam every 3rd Sunday of the month at 2:00 pm.

== See also ==
- Diocese of Middlesbrough
- Listed buildings in Scarborough (Castle Ward)
