= Settrington House =

Building in Settrington, North Yorkshire, England

Coordinates: 54°07′15″N 0°42′59″W

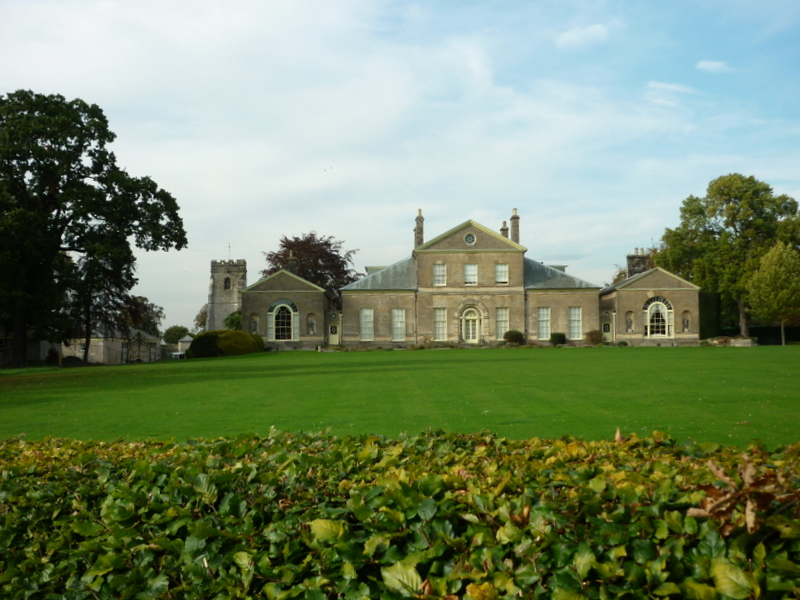
The building, in 2011

Settrington House is a historic building in Settrington, a village in North Yorkshire, in England.

The Bigod family had a house in Settrington. In the early 1790s, Mark and Henrietta Masterman Sykes commissioned a new house on a nearby site. The entrance front of the house was altered in the 19th century, and again in 1939. In 1963, the centre of the building suffered a fire, and it was rebuilt by Francis Johnson. The house was grade II listed in 1986.

The house is built of sandstone on a plinth. The garden front has two storeys and an attic, and a central block of three bays with a dentilled pediment containing an oculus. This is flanked by slightly recessed single-storey two-bay wings, recessed link bays, and gabled pavilions. In the middle of the central block is a round-arched doorway with a rusticated surround, and imposts with paterae. The windows are sashes, with a sill band on the upper floor. The flanking wings have a dentilled cornice, and contain sash windows. On the linking bays are panelled parapets, and the pavilions have pedimented gables. They contain rebuilt Venetian windows, flanked by round-headed niches, and with a sill band. The entrance front has a central doorway with an eared architrave, it is approached by a double staircase, and has an eared architrave. The front also contains sash windows, a Venetian oriel window, and a dentilled pediment with a tripartite lunette.

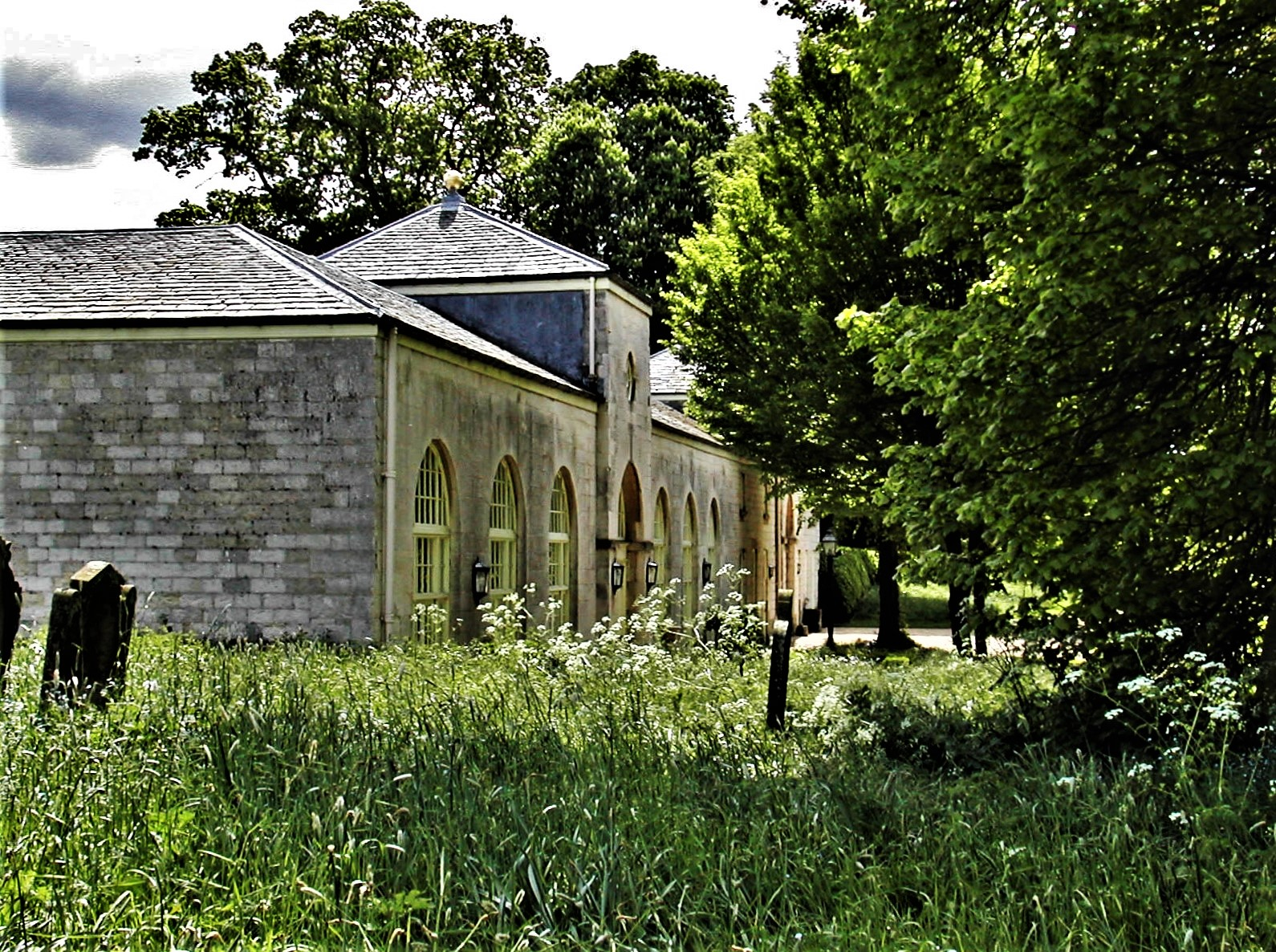
The Riding School

The Riding School, built in 1793, is grade II* listed. The building is built of sandstone on a plinth, with a timber eaves course and an M-shaped slate roof, hipped on the left. There is a single-storey range of seven bays. The central bay is taller, with a loft, and a pyramidal roof with a ball finial. It contains a tall round-headed carriage arch with imposts and a lunette, and above is an oculus. The other bays form recessed blind arcades containing lunettes with pivoting centre lights. Inside, a pair of Doric columns support a lantern over the middle bay.

== See also ==
- Grade II* listed buildings in North Yorkshire (district)
- Listed buildings in Settrington
