= Owstwick =

Hamlet in the East Riding of Yorkshire, England

Coordinates: 53.775412°N 0.070755°W

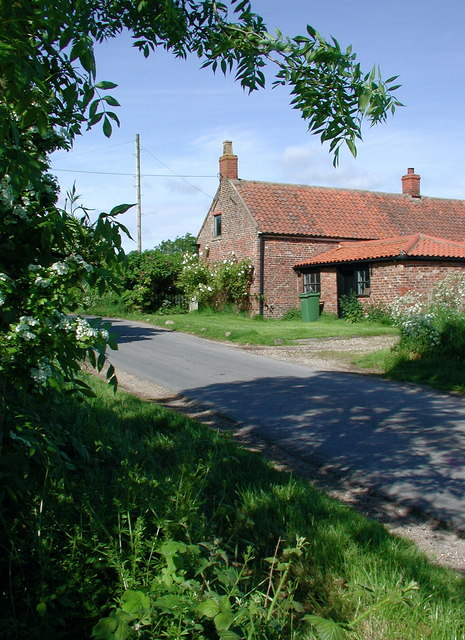
- Quaker Road, Owstwick

- Location within the East Riding of Yorkshire
- OS grid reference: TA272327
  - London: 155 mi (249 km) S
- Civil parish: Roos
- Unitary authority: East Riding of Yorkshire
- Ceremonial county: East Riding of Yorkshire
- Region: Yorkshire and the Humber
- Country: England
- Sovereign state: United Kingdom
- Post town: HULL
- Postcode district: HU12
- Dialling code: 01964
- Police: Humberside
- Fire: Humberside
- Ambulance: Yorkshire
- UK Parliament: Beverley and Holderness

Owstwick is a hamlet in the civil parish of Roos, in the East Riding of Yorkshire, England, in an area known as Holderness. It is approximately 11 miles (18 km) east of Kingston upon Hull city centre and 5 miles (8 km) north-west of Withernsea. It lies to the west of the B1242 road.

== History ==
During the Saxon period Owstwick had its own thane, called Hoste (later corrupted to Owst). The Domesday Book lists the settlement name as "Hostewic" and "Ostewic", under the manors and lords of Kilnsea and Hilston, and in the Hundred of Holderness. At the Norman Conquest the lords of Holderness, and therefore Owstwick, were Earl Morcar and Murdoch of Hilston. Owstwick was a small settlement of about 5 households, with 45 villagers, 6 freemen, one priest and a church. There were 44 ploughlands and a meadow of 12 acres. In 1086 lordship was transferred to Drogo of la BeuvriËre, who also became Tenant-in-chief to King William I. Domesday records that in Edward the Confessor's time the combined manor of Hilston with parts of Owstwick was valued at fifty-five shillings.

The Dictionary of British Place Names gives the derivation of Owstwick as "eastern outlying farm" from the Old Scandinavian 'austr' and the Old English 'wic'.

Owstwick in 1812 had a population of 106. There were 18 families in 18 houses, with 17 farmers and one trader. By 1823 population had increased to 139, including four farmers and a Tuesday carrier to Hull; occupation numbers had not changed by 1851, although population had dropped to 103.

In 1818, in the part of Owstwick that was in Roos, inhabitants numbered 59. A parliamentary report of the following year stated that in the parish there were three schools, in each of which 30 children were taught, about two thirds of whom belonged to the parish. There was a Sunday School where 30 boys and 25 girls were taught. The report stated that: "the greater part of the poorer classes are without the means of education, and very desirous of possessing them."

In the 1830s Owstwick became part of a group of twenty-seven parishes and townships under the Patrington Union, which provided for a Union workhouse at Patrington, opened in 1838 for the accommodation of 150 paupers. Owstwick's yearly saving on poor-relief costs by being part of the Union system was estimated at the time as £1,000, this being similar for all parishes contributing.

A Tithe Commission under the 1836 Tithe Commutation Act recorded Owstwick township as consisting of 1,330 acres (5.4 km^{2}), largely within the parish of Roos, with 452 acres in the parish of Garton. By 1841, although Owstwick was called a 'manor', no manorial rights then existed. In 1780 principal parish landowners had been Sir Christopher Sykes and Admiral Storr; by 1841 they were Sir Tatton Sykes, Admiral Mitford, and Joseph Storr.

In 1882 the number of inhabitants had dropped to 80, of whom six were farmers. A Society of Friends' burial ground still existed, although their meeting house had been converted to a cottage. In 1913 Sir Tatton Sykes of Sledmere House was lord of the manor and principal landowner. Inhabitants in 1911 numbered 114, with four farmers, and children attending school at Garton.

=== Quakers ===
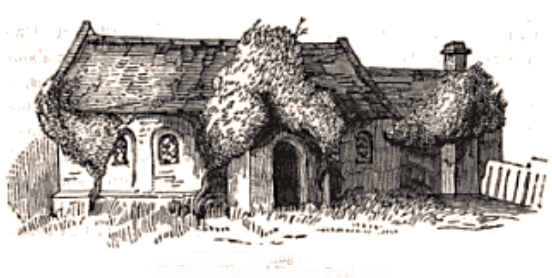
Friends Meeting House, Owstwick

Owstwick was a centre for Quaker faith in the 17th and 18th centuries. The religious dissenter George Fox was released from Scarborough Castle in 1666, and finding the Quaker movement languishing decided on a nationwide review of the religion and Quaker meetings. In 1669 the review reached Yorkshire, and Owstwick. Monthly meetings, previously based on larger areas, were broken down into smaller units, one being Owstwick, as part of a formalised pyramidic restructure.

The oldest record of Quaker activity at Owstwick is in 1654. A 1671 will by a Robert Raven stipulated a wish to be buried in Owstwick burial ground. A Thomas Smith, buried at Owstwick and 78 years when he died in 1749, had been born to Quaker parents. A member of the Owstwick Quaker community was Marmaduke Storr, a "man of substance" who became a Quaker in 1652, one of the earliest converts. He was an opponent of John Harwood of North Frodingham and Harwood's dispute with George Fox over Fox's authority, a dispute that descended into personal insult. Fox was a visitor to Storr's house in 1665, a house which became the centre for Quaker Monthly Meetings. By the middle of the 19th century, the Meeting House was in disrepair, and no indication was evident of its date of erection, however, the burial ground was still occasionally used by followers.

Following the appointment of Thomas Herring as Archbishop of York in 1743, he wrote to diocese clergy, asking to be informed of dissenting families in their parishes. Reports back included those of the Owstwick Meeting House and families with Quaker sympathies.

=== Owst ===
According to the 1856 and 1857 History and topography of the City of York, the Owst family name leads directly to the original Saxon thanes who gave their name to the village. The name reappears in records in 1349, during the reign of Edward III, with a Robert Owst who had possessions in Hedon, and whose descendant branches "have lived in Holderness for centuries", and held lands in Nunkeeling, Welwick and Halsham. An Owst (died 1489), was Prior of Nunkeeling Priory. A Thomas Owst lived at Halsham in 1575, his descendants surviving there until 1836 when the last Thomas Owst left—he also held freehold property in Owstwick. The Owst family were Roman Catholic and lived under difficulties in the 18th century. In The History and Antiquities of the Seigniory of Holderness, Poulson quotes a 1745 certificate given to Thomas Owst, which describes him as a popish recusant, by Act of Parliament unable to travel farther than five miles from place of abode. The certificate signed by the Deputy Lieutenant was a licence allowing him to travel to Drax to visit his ill wife, under conditions including a stipulated return date.

== Governance ==
Owstwick forms part of the civil parish of Roos and is represented locally by Roos Parish Council while at county level is in the South East Holderness ward of the East Riding of Yorkshire Council. At a parliamentary level it is part of the Beverley and Holderness constituency which is represented by Graham Stuart of the Conservative Party.

Owstwick was formerly a township in the parishes of Roos and Garton, in 1866 Owstwick became a separate civil parish, on 1 April 1935 the parish was abolished and merged with Roos. In 1931 the parish had a population of 81.

== See also ==
- Listed buildings in Roos
