= St George's Church, Scarborough =

Church in Scarborough, North Yorkshire, England

Coordinates: 54.239655°N 0.396779°W

St George's Church is a Catholic church in the Eastfield area of Scarborough, North Yorkshire, a town in England.

When the Eastfield estate was constructed, Catholic mass was initially said in the community centre. In 1957, a building was constructed to serve as a combined church and church hall. The building was designed by Francis Johnson, and the work, including a nearby presbytery, cost £15,000. It was originally a chapel of ease to St Peter's Church, Scarborough, but in 1965 it was given its own parish. In the 1980s the entrance front was extended, to provide a new entrance, kitchen, and other service spaces. In 1999, the church reverted to serving as a chapel of ease.

The building is constructed of red brick with a pantile roof. Half the building is the church and the other half is the church hall, the two divided by a folding screen which can be removed to create a single space. The building has doors and windows of domestic style. The entrance bays are gabled. Inside, it has pews brought from the chapel at Houghton Hall, East Riding of Yorkshire, and wooden furnishings in the sanctuary from 1957. These include the altar and altar rail, holy water stoup, candlesticks, and statues including the Stations of the Cross. There is a small side chapel and a recess for the organ.
