= Cornelian (disambiguation) =

Cornelian (usually spelled "carnelian") is a reddish-brown variety of the mineral chalcedony.

Cornelian may also refer to:

- Cornelian automobile, a 1914 racing vehicle
- Cornelian Bay (disambiguation), multiple places
- Cornelian dilemma, a dilemma named after dramatist Pierre Corneille
- Cornelia (gens), an important gens in ancient Rome
- Deudorix epijarbas, an Asian butterfly
- A variety of plants in the dogwood family including
  - Cornus florida
  - Cornelian cherry
  - Japanese cornelian cherry

== See also ==
- Cornellian, a term used to describe people affiliated with Cornell University
