= Listed buildings in Hutton Cranswick =

Hutton Cranswick is a civil parish in the county of the East Riding of Yorkshire, England. It contains ten listed buildings that are recorded in the National Heritage List for England. Of these, one is listed at Grade II*, the middle of the three grades, and the others are at Grade II, the lowest grade. The parish contains the village of Hutton Cranswick, the hamlet of Sunderlandwick and the surrounding countryside. The listed buildings consist of houses and associated structures, a church, a farmhouse, a former windmill, a former railway station and goods sheds, and a war memorial.

== Key ==
Grade	Criteria
II*	Particularly important buildings of more than special interest
II	Buildings of national importance and special interest

== Buildings ==
Name and location	Photograph	Date	Notes	Grade
St Peter's Church; 53.96619°N 0.44041°W		12th century	The church has been altered and extended through the centuries, including an extensive restoration in 1875–76 by Ewan Christian, and restoration of the chancel in 1919 by Temple Moore. The church is built in sandstone with a grey slate roof, and consists of a nave with a clerestory, north and south aisles, a south porch, a chancel with a north vestry, and a west tower. The tower has two stages, a stepped and chamfered plinth, angle buttresses, a three-light pointed west window with a hood mould, and a band. The upper stage has slit windows, clock faces, and two-light bell openings, and above is an embattled parapet with corner crocketed pinnacles. The south doorway incorporates Norman decoration.	II*
14(A) Station Road; 53.95556°N 0.43145°W	—	Mid-18th century (probable)	The house is in brick, with a modillion eaves cornice, and a pantile roof with brick copings and tumbled-in brick on the gable ends. There are two storeys and a front range of four bays, a rear range and a later range to the left. The doorway has a fluted surround and a hood, and the windows are sashes under flat arches of rubbed brick.	II
Sunnyside; 53.95640°N 0.43856°W	—	c. 1760	The house is in rendered pinkish-brown brick with a pantile roof. There are two storeys and three bays, a rear range and an outshut on the right. In the centre is a porch, and a doorway with a fluted surround, a fanlight and a keystone. On the main block, the windows are sashes with keystones, on the right gable end is a pitching door, and the outshut has multi-paned casement windows.	II
Pit Top Farmhouse and walls 53.96305°N 0.44217°W	—	Late 18th to early 19th century	The farmhouse is in pinkish-brown brick, with stone dressings, pilasters on the ends and between the bays, a floor band, an eaves band, and a pantile roof. There are two storeys and three bays, and a rear outshut. The central doorway has a fanlight and a hood, and the windows are sashes under flat brick arches. The flanking walls are ramped, in brick with stone copings, and end in square piers with ball finials.	II
Windmill, Pit Top Farm; 53.96339°N 0.44259°W		Early 19th century	The former tower windmill is in pinkish-brown brick, it is circular and tapering, and has four storeys. The entrance has a board door, above which are two four-pane fixed light windows, and a two-course band.	II
Stables, Sunderlandwick House; 53.98562°N 0.45043°W	—	c. 1840	The stable block is in white painted brick with a slate roof, and forms four ranges round a courtyard. It has a round-arched entrance with a pediment, and a square turret in Italianate style with a cupola. The windows have three lights, and those in the end pavilions have round-arched lights.	II
Station House, Hutton Cranswick railway station 53.95589°N 0.43410°W		1846	Originally the stationmaster's house and waiting room, later a private house, it was designed by G. T. Andrews for the York and North Midland Railway Company. It is in pinkish-yellow brick, with stone dressings, sill bands, wide overhanging eaves, and a Welsh slate roof. There are two storeys and a T-shaped plan, with three bays, and a projecting single-storey bay, the former waiting room. The entrance to the house has a flat arch of gauged brick, and the waiting room entrance has a round arch, pilasters, a radial fanlight, a keystone, a cornice, and a blocking course. The windows are sashes under flat arches of gauged brick.	II
Former holding sheds, Hutton Cranswick railway station 53.95631°N 0.43400°W		Mid to late 19th century	The goods sheds, later used for other purposes, were designed by G. T. Andrews for the North Eastern Railway. The building is in reddish-brown brick, partly colourwashed, with stone dressings, a sill band, overhanging eaves and a Welsh slate roof, hipped on the left. There is one tall storey, two bays and a range on the left. The central doorway has a round arch, it is flanked by semicircular fixed multi-pane windows with round arches, all the arches of gauged brick.	II
War memorial 53.95653°N 0.44009°W		1921	The war memorial is in an enclosure on Cranswick Green, surrounded by low wall of rock-faced stone. It is in Portland stone, and has an octagonal stepped base with inscribed panels, on which is a moulded cornice, a tapering octagonal shaft, another moulded cornice, and a plain cross.	II
Sunderlandwick House; 53.98501°N 0.44954°W	—	1962–63	The house was designed by Francis Johnson to replace an earlier house destroyed by fire. It is in pale yellow brick on a stone base, with a stone and timber cornice and details, and a hipped slate roof. There are two storeys and an L-shaped plan with linked pavilions. In the centre of the main front is an elliptical bow, flanked by segmental-arched tripartite windows, and pilasters at the ends. To the northeast is a pedimented loggia with Doric columns. The southeast front has seven bays, and a link to a pedimented pavilion. The entrance is on the north side through a semicircular porch.	II
