= Killerby Old Hall =

Historic building in Cayton, North Yorkshire, England

Coordinates: 54°13′50″N 0°22′16″W

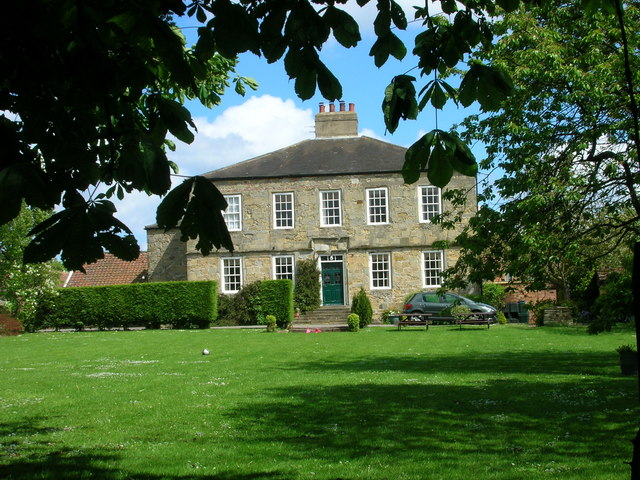
The building, in 2009

Killerby Old Hall is a historic building in Cayton, a village in North Yorkshire, in England.

The building was constructed in the 17th century. It was remodelled in the mid 18th century, and in the 19th century, it was heightened, and the roof was replaced. During this period, a new Killerby Hall was built nearby, for James Cooper, with the older building becoming a farmhouse. It was Grade II listed in 1967. Its grounds now house a caravan park, and plans were announced in 2024 to convert one of its outbuildings into a wedding venue.

The house is built of sandstone, with quoins, a moulded string course, and a hipped slate roof. It has two storeys, five bays, and it incorporates an earlier staircase tower on the left. The central doorway is approached by stone steps and has a divided fanlight, and the windows on the front are sashes; all these openings have splayed architraves. In the returns are mullioned and transomed windows, and the staircase tower has a blocked Tudor arched doorway and a mullioned window above. Inside, there is a 17th-century staircase, moved from elsewhere, reused 17th century panelling in one first floor room, and a massive 18th century fireplace with a bread oven in the former kitchen.

== See also ==
- Listed buildings in Cayton
