= Holy Nativity Church, Eastfield =

Church in Eastfield, North Yorkshire, England

Coordinates: 54.2419°N 0.4019°W

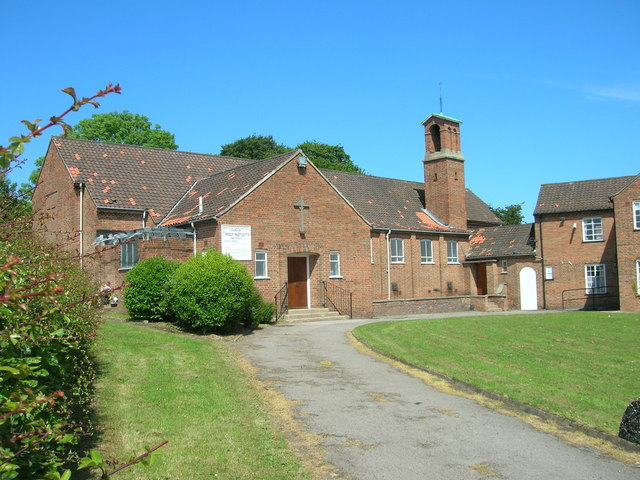
The church, in 2009

Holy Nativity Church is an Anglican parish church in Eastfield, North Yorkshire, a town in England.

The church was built between 1954 and 1955, to a design by Francis Johnson. It is built of brick, in a simple modern style. The church was altered in 1973, again to designs by Johnson. This entailed the construction of a new church hall with kitchen and cloakrooms, and the conversion of the old kitchen, cloakrooms and stage into a vestry and chapel.

The BBC describes the interior as "spacious, bright and airy, and simply decorated". It notes that some local parishoners prefer to worship at the historic St John the Baptist's Church, Cayton, nearby.
