= Rotsea =

Hamlet in the East Riding of Yorkshire, England

Coordinates: 53.951164°N 0.378491°W

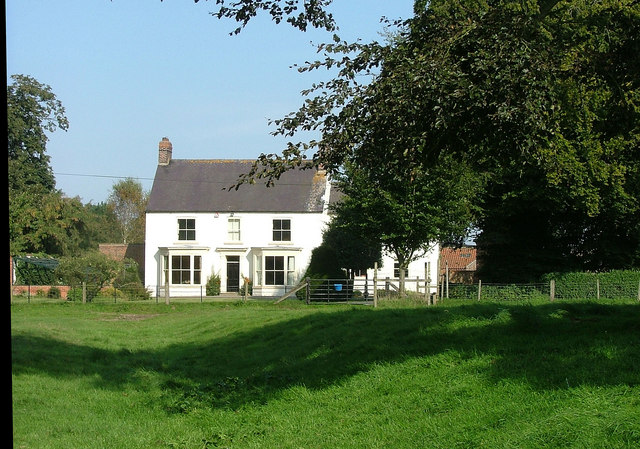
- Farmhouse at Rotsea

- Location within the East Riding of Yorkshire
- OS grid reference: TA065517
- Civil parish: Hutton Cranswick
- Unitary authority: East Riding of Yorkshire
- Ceremonial county: East Riding of Yorkshire
- Region: Yorkshire and the Humber
- Country: England
- Sovereign state: United Kingdom
- Post town: DRIFFIELD
- Postcode district: YO25
- Dialling code: 01377
- Police: Humberside
- Fire: Humberside
- Ambulance: Yorkshire
- UK Parliament: Bridlington and The Wolds

Rotsea is a hamlet and former civil parish, now in the parish of Hutton Cranswick, in the East Riding of Yorkshire, England. It is situated approximately 4.5 miles (7.2 km) south-east of Driffield and 2.5 miles (4 km) south-west of North Frodingham. In 1931 the parish had a population of 29.

The parish recreation ground, which is home to all Hutton Cranswick football teams including the successful Hutton Cranswick United football club, is based near to Rotsea and the ground is known as Rotsea Lane.

The name Rotsea derives from the Old English Rotsǣ meaning 'Rot's lake', or possibly from hrotsǣ meaning 'scum lake'.

== Civil parish ==
Rotsea was formerly a township in the parish of Hutton-Cranswick, from 1866 Rotsea was a civil parish in its own right, on 1 April 1935 the parish was abolished and merged with Hutton Cranswick.
