= St Peter's Church, Hutton Cranswick =

Church in the East Riding of Yorkshire, England

Coordinates: 53°57′58″N 0°26′26″W

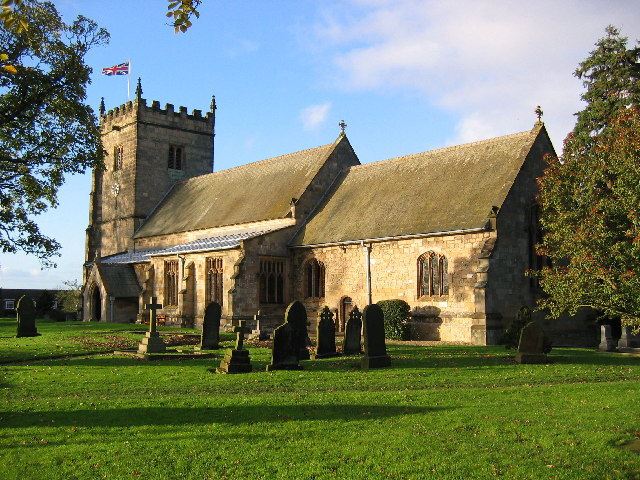
The church, in 2005

St Peter's Church is the parish church of Hutton Cranswick, a village in the East Riding of Yorkshire, in England.

The oldest parts of the church are 12th century, and other elements date from the 13th century. The building was partly reconstructed in the 15th century. It was restored by Ewan Christian between 1875 and 1876, the work including a new porch and vestry. In 1919, the chancel was restored by Temple Moore. The building was grade II* listed in 1966. A 12th-century font was found in pieces in the rockery of the vicarage, reassembled, and placed on display at the Hull and East Riding Museum.

The church is built of sandstone with a grey slate roof, and consists of a nave with a clerestory, north and south aisles, a south porch, a chancel with a north vestry, and a west tower. The tower has two stages, a stepped and chamfered plinth, angle buttresses, a three-light pointed west window with a hood mould, and a band. The upper stage has slit windows, clock faces, and two-light bell openings, and above is an embattled parapet with corner crocketed pinnacles. The south doorway incorporates Norman decoration. Inside, there is a piscina, a damaged effigy in a recess, and an octagonal 19th-century font.

== See also ==
- Grade II* listed buildings in the East Riding of Yorkshire
- Listed buildings in Hutton Cranswick
