= Tunstall, East Riding of Yorkshire =

Village in the East Riding of Yorkshire, England

Coordinates: 53.767678°N 0.020961°W

Tunstall
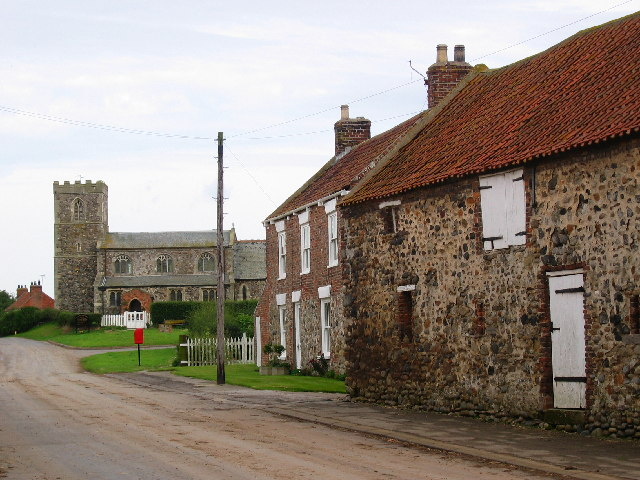
- Tunstall Village : All Saints' Church, Manor Farm, and Manor Farm barn outbuilding

- Location within the East Riding of Yorkshire
- OS grid reference: TA305319
  - London: 155 mi (249 km) S
- Civil parish: Roos
- Unitary authority: East Riding of Yorkshire
- Ceremonial county: East Riding of Yorkshire
- Region: Yorkshire and the Humber
- Country: England
- Sovereign state: United Kingdom
- Post town: HULL
- Postcode district: HU12
- Dialling code: 01964
- Police: Humberside
- Fire: Humberside
- Ambulance: Yorkshire
- UK Parliament: Beverley and Holderness

Tunstall is a village in the civil parish of Roos, in Holderness, in the East Riding of Yorkshire, England, close to the North Sea coast. It is situated approximately 3 miles (4.8 km) north-west of the town of Withernsea, and less than 0.6 miles (1 km) from the North Sea coast, at a height of 33 to 49 ft (10 to 15 m) above sea level, and close to the Prime Meridian at its northernmost point on land anywhere in the world.

== Geography ==
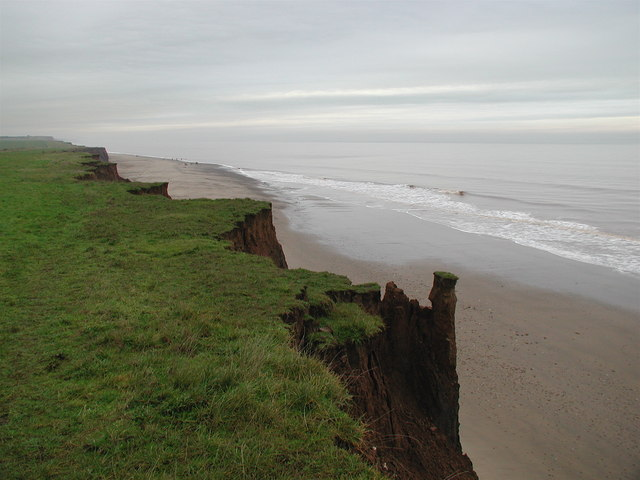
Cliffs and beach at Tunstall beach

The coastline at Tunstall is eroding at an average rate of 3 ft 7 in to 6 ft 7 in (1.1 to 2 m) a year.

To the south-east of Tunstall is a 126-acre (51 ha), 550 pitch caravan holiday park, Sand le Mere Holiday Village.

== History ==
The name Tunstall derives from the Old English tūnstall meaning 'farmstead'.

Tunstall was recorded in the Domesday Book of 1086 as "Tunestal", within the manor of Withernsea. The church of All Saints was originally of Norman construction, with many later alterations in the 13th and 14th centuries, primarily of beach cobble with stone dressings; a tower was added in the 15th century.

Tunstall in Holderness Inclosure Act 1777
- Act of Parliament
- Parliament of Great Britain
- Long title: An Act for dividing and enclosing the Open Fields, Meadows, Pastures, and other un-enclosed Grounds, within the Township of Tunstall, in Holderness, in the East Riding of the County of York.
- Citation: 17 Geo. 3. c. 30 Pr.
- Territorial extent: Great Britain

Dates
- Royal assent: 27 March 1777
- Commencement: 31 October 1776 (Note: Start of session.)

Status: Current legislation

A number of buildings in the village date to the early 18th century, including the cobble-built Town Farmhouse, Manor Farmhouse and nearby barn. The brick-built Hall Farmhouse was constructed in the later 18th century, An inclosure act for the land around the village was passed in 1777, the Tunstall in Holderness Inclosure Act 1777 (17 Geo. 3. c. 30 Pr.). The Kings Arms public house dates back to at least the 1850s.

In 1823 inhabitants in the village numbered 163. Occupations included eight farmers, two shopkeepers, a tailor, a corn factor, and the landlady of the Cock public house. A carrier operated between the village and Hull on Tuesdays. Tunstall was close to the coastal Sand le Mar, an area frequented by neighbouring village inhabitants collecting sand and pebbles for the repair of roads.

During the anti-invasion preparations of the Second World War a number of fortifications were constructed near Tunstall, including: a minefield north of the village, a weapons pit, several coastal pillboxes, and tank traps.

After the end of the Second World War, one of the pillbox structures was reused as a nuclear explosion monitoring post (Royal Observer Corps Monitoring Post) during the Cold War period. The structure fell into the sea due to coastal erosion in January 2026.

In 2016, a 'Golf-Ball' style weather station was installed near the village to monitor weather conditions around the Westermost Rough Wind Farm. The inhabitants of Tunstall would like to see its removal as they believe its radar has been the cause of a number of rare cancers in the villagers. A report by East Riding County Council determined the radar extended a 60° beam outwards across the sea and the nearest homes were outside the field of this beam. Ørsted, the Westermost Rough wind farm operating company, have stated that the radar is within international guidelines and applied to extend the life of the station to 2019.

== Greenwich meridian ==
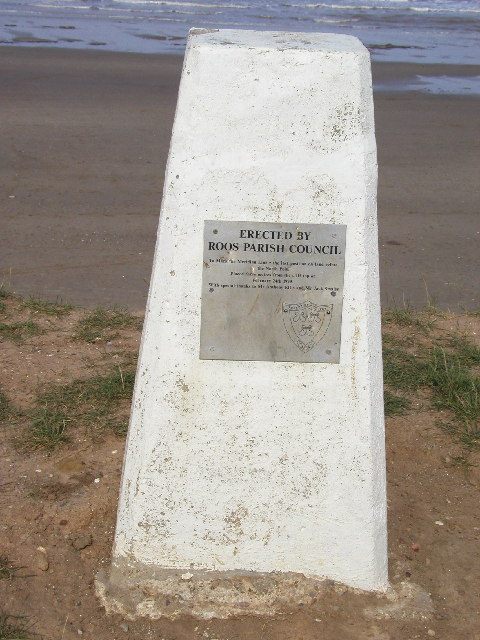
The Trig Point in 2002, since destroyed

At a point on Tunstall beach, near Sand-le-Mere, the Greenwich Meridian makes its first landfall at 0° longitude as it runs from the North Pole to the South Pole through the Royal Greenwich Observatory, London, separating the Western hemisphere from the Eastern hemisphere.

The Greenwich meridian was not marked at the site until 1999, when it was decided to mark it in deference to the upcoming new millennium. A trig point that was about to fall into the sea further along the coast was rescued and repurposed as a meridian marker at Tunstall. Less than five years later, in 2003, the trig point fell from the cliff and broke up on the beach as a result of coastal erosion. It has never been formally replaced. As of February 2021, the meridian was marked by a traffic cone lined up with a breeze block on the beach.

To coincide with the 125th anniversary of the Greenwich Meridian in 2009, a Greenwich Meridian Trail walking route was inaugurated by amateur walkers Hilda and Graham Heap which links the point at which the meridian makes landfall at Tunstall with the point at which it exits mainland Britain at the Meridian Monument in Peacehaven, East Sussex.

== Governance ==
Tunstall forms part of the civil parish of Roos and is represented locally by Roos Parish Council while at county level is in the South East Holderness ward of the East Riding of Yorkshire Council. At a parliamentary level it is part of the Beverley and Holderness constituency which is currently represented (as of 2024) by Graham Stuart of the Conservative Party.

In 1931 the parish had a population of 102. On 1 April 1935 the parish was abolished and merged with Roos.

== See also ==
- Listed buildings in Roos

== Bibliography ==
- Gazetteer – A–Z of Towns Villages and Hamlets. East Riding of Yorkshire Council. 2006. p. 11.
