= Listed buildings in Roos =

Roos is a civil parish in the county of the East Riding of Yorkshire, England. It contains 18 listed buildings that are recorded in the National Heritage List for England. Of these, two are listed at Grade I, the highest of the three grades, and the others are at Grade II, the lowest grade. The parish contains the villages of Roos, Hilston and Tunstall, the hamlet of Owstwick, and the surrounding countryside. Most of the listed buildings are houses, farmhouses and farm buildings, and the others consist of two churches, a look-out tower, and a telephone kiosk.

== Key ==
Grade	Criteria
I	Buildings of exceptional interest, sometimes considered to be internationally important
II	Buildings of national importance and special interest

== Buildings ==
Name and location	Photograph	Date	Notes	Grade
All Saints' Church, Roos; 53.74696°N 0.04426°W		13th century or earlier	The church has been altered and enlarged through the centuries, including a restoration by L. N. Cottingham in 1842. It is built in cobbles with freestone dressings, some medieval brick, and it has slate roofs. The church consists of a nave with a clerestory, north and south aisles, a chancel with a two-storey north vestry and a circular stair turret, and a south chapel, a west tower embraced by the aisles, and a west porch. The tower has three stages, a moulded plinth and string courses, buttresses, a pointed west window, two-light pointed bell openings, and an embattled parapet.	I
All Saints' Church, Tunstall; 53.76790°N 0.02082°W		13th century	The church has been altered and enlarged through the centuries, including a restoration and some rebuilding in 1873–74. It is built in cobbles with stone dressings, the porch is in brick and the roof is slated. The church consists of a nave with a clerestory, north and south aisles, a south porch, a chancel and a west tower. The tower has a moulded plinth, chamfered string courses, a three-light pointed west window, a small lancet window, two-light pointed bell openings, and an embattled parapet. On the chancel, a lancet window and the priest's door date from the 13th century.	I
Glebe Farmhouse; 53.78348°N 0.04682°W	—	Late 17th century	A cross-wing was later added to the farmhouse, which is in colourwashed red brick on a plinth, with a floor band and a pantile roof with tumbled-in brick to the plain close verges. There are two storeys and four bays and a cross-wing. On the front is a doorway, and the windows are sashes.	II
Mount Farmhouse; 53.78280°N 0.05191°W		Late 17th to early 18th century	The house, which was later extended, is in red brick with a stepped eaves cornice, and pantile roofs with tumbled-in brick to the raised gables. The original part has one storey and two bays, and contains a projecting gabled porch and sash windows. The rear wing has a doorway with pilasters, a fanlight, panelled reveals and a soffit, and a cornice.	II
Barn south of Manor Farmhouse; 53.76659°N 0.02044°W	—	Early 18th century	The barn is in cobbles and stone, with dark red dressings, and a pantile roof with tumbled-in brick to the raised gables. There are two storeys and four bays. The barn contains a doorway, windows, slit vents and taking-in doors.	II
The Cottage; 53.78322°N 0.05334°W	—	Early 18th century	The house is in colourwashed red brick, with a dentiled brick eaves cornice, and a pantile roof with tumbled-in brick to the raised coped gables. There are two storeys and four bays. The doorway has moulded reveals, and the windows are sashes.	II
Town Farmhouse; 53.76645°N 0.02062°W		Early 18th century	The farmhouse is in cobble, with a stepped brick eaves cornice, and a pantile roof. There is one storey and attics, three original bays, and a later bay to the left. On the front is a doorway, to its left is a sash window, to the right is a 20th-century windows with a top opening light, and above is a gabled roof dormer with a casement window.	II
Admiral Storr's Tower; 53.78504°N 0.04942°W		1750	Also known as Hilston Mount, this is a look-out tower in orange brick with stone dressings. There are three storeys and an octagonal plan, with a projecting semicircular stair turret on the south. It contains a doorway under a flat gauged brick arch, and above it is a datestone with a coat of arms. The other openings are blocked and have flat gauged brick arches. On the top is a coped parapet, ramped up over the stair turret.	II
Hilltop Farmhouse; 53.76008°N 0.04898°W		Mid-18th century	The house is in orange brick, and has a pantile roof with tumbled-in brick to the raised coped gables. There are two storeys and three bays. In the centre is a projecting porch, and the windows are sashes under flat gauged brick arches.	II
Manor Farmhouse; 53.76682°N 0.02049°W		18th century	The house is in cobbles on the ground floor, with orange brick to the upper floor, and it has a pantile roof with tumbled-in brick to the raised gables. There are two storeys, three bays, and a rear outshut under a catslide roof. On the front is a doorway and sash windows, all under wedge lintels.	II
The Bungalow; 53.75131°N 0.04554°W	—	18th century (probable)	The house is in clay with brick cladding, partly rendered, with a pantile roof. There is one storey, two bays, a later two-bay extension to the left, and half a bay to the right. On the front are porches and irregular fenestration.	II
The Elms; 53.74754°N 0.04610°W		18th century (probable)	The house is in orange brick, rendered and colourwashed on the main front, on a plinth, with rusticated quoins and a slate roof. There are two storeys and five bays. On the front is a porch with plain columns and foliated capitals, a fanlight in panelled reveals and a soffit, and a Composite entablature. This is flanked by canted bay windows, and on the upper floor are sash windows in architraves.	II
Barn, Harcourt House; 53.76102°N 0.04729°W		Mid to late 18th century	The barn is in red brick, and has a pantile roof with tumbled-in brick to the raised gables. There are two storeys and three bays. In the centre of the ground floor is a doorway with a timber lintel, and on the upper floor are cross-shaped slit vents and a taking-in door.	II
Dent's Garth; 53.74904°N 0.04389°W	—	Late 18th century	The house is in orange brick, with a dentilled brick eaves cornice, and a pantile roof with tumbled-in brick to the raised gables. There are two storeys, four bays, and a parallel rear range. On the front is a doorway flanked by sash windows, and with a casement window to the extreme left. The upper floor contains sash windows.	II
Hall Farmhouse; 53.76100°N 0.01376°W	—	Late 18th century	The house is in orange brick, with a timber eaves cornice on paired brackets, and a tile roof with tumbled-in brick to the raised gables on shaped kneelers. There are two storeys, three bays and a rear wing on the left. The central doorway has attached unfluted columns, a fanlight in panelled reveals, and a dentilled pediment. This is flanked by canted bay windows, and on the upper floor are sash windows under flat gauged brick arches.	II
Harcourt House; 53.76082°N 0.04743°W	—	Late 18th century	The house is in brown brick, and has a pantile roof with tumbled-in brick to the raised gables. There are two storeys, two bays, and a continuous rear outshut under a catslide roof. In the centre is a porch and the windows are from the 20th-century with top-opening lights, those on the ground floor under elliptical gauged brick arches, and on the upper floor under flat gauged brick arches.	II
Owstwick Hall; 53.77651°N 0.05882°W	—	1829	The house is in dark brown brick, with stone dressings, a sill band, a bracketed eaves cornice, and a hipped slate roof. There are two storeys, an L-shaped plan, and a front range of three bays. In the centre is a doorcase with attached Doric columns, a entablature and a blocking course. The doorway has a fanlight with radial glazing, panelled reveals and a soffit. The windows are sashes under cambered wedge lintels.	II
Telephone kiosk 53.76127°N 0.01313°W	—	1930 or later	The relocated telephone kiosk near Hall Farmhouse is of the K4 type. It is in cast iron, and painted red, and has three top panels with perforated crowns. The door and the windows are all in fluted surrounds with panels beneath. At the rear are stamp selling machines and a posting box.	II
