= Cornelian Bay, North Yorkshire =

Bay in North Yorkshire, England

Coordinates: 54.258°N 0.370°W

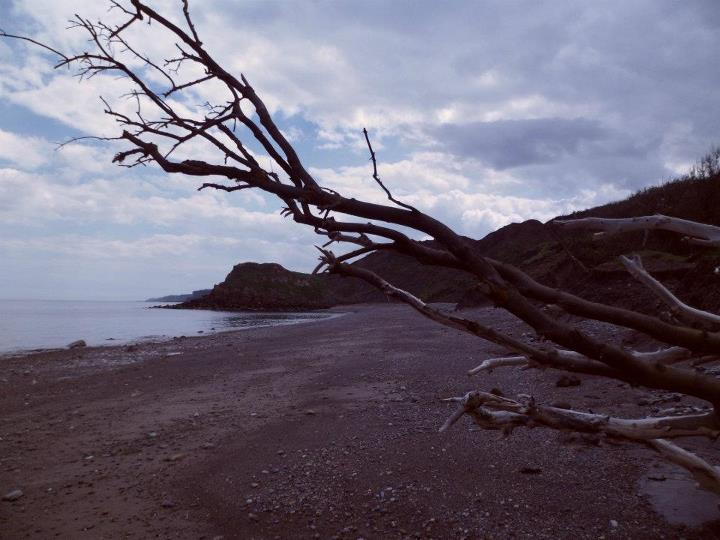
Cornelian Bay, looking towards Knipe Point

Cornelian Bay is a bay of the North Sea near Scarborough, North Yorkshire, England. It is located between the headlands of White Nab and Knipe Point, just north of Cayton Bay. Geographical features of note include two Second World War pillboxes.

Public access can be had from the steep lane leading from the Yorkshire Water pumping station, just off the A165 Filey Road. The Cleveland Way skirts the clifftop for the length of the bay. The beach is sheltered and sandy.

The bay is named after the semi-precious stone carnelian, examples of which are occasionally found washed up on the shore.
