= Roos =

Village and civil parish in the East Riding of Yorkshire, England

Coordinates: 53.753578°N 0.043694°W

- Village and civil parish
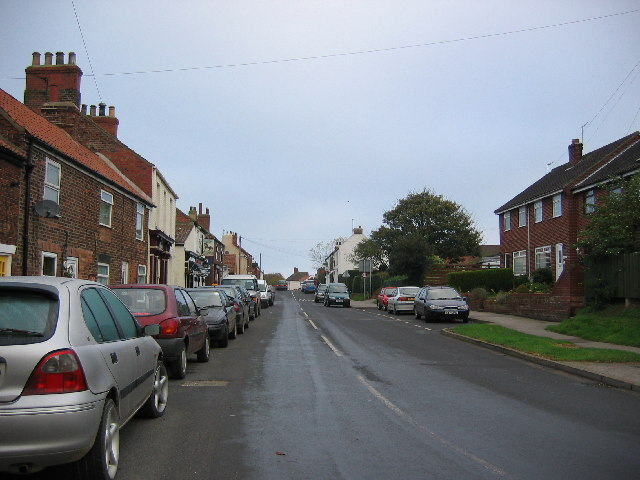
- Roos village, Main Street (B1242)

- Location within the East Riding of Yorkshire
- Population: 1,168 (2011 census)
- OS grid reference: TA290303
  - London: 155 mi (249 km) S
- Civil parish: Roos
- Unitary authority: East Riding of Yorkshire
- Ceremonial county: East Riding of Yorkshire
- Region: Yorkshire and the Humber
- Country: England
- Sovereign state: United Kingdom
- Post town: HULL
- Postcode district: HU12
- Dialling code: 01964
- Police: Humberside
- Fire: Humberside
- Ambulance: Yorkshire
- UK Parliament: Beverley and Holderness

Roos is a village and civil parish in the East Riding of Yorkshire, England. It is situated 12 miles (19 km) east from Kingston upon Hull city centre and 3.5 miles (6 km) north-west from Withernsea, and on the B1242 road.

== History ==
The name Roos derives from the Primitive Welsh ros meaning 'moor' or 'promontory'.

The de Ros family originated from the village of Roos. Robert de Ros (died 1227) was one of the twenty-five barons appointed under clause 61 of the 1215 Magna Carta agreement to monitor its observance by King John of England.

== Geography ==
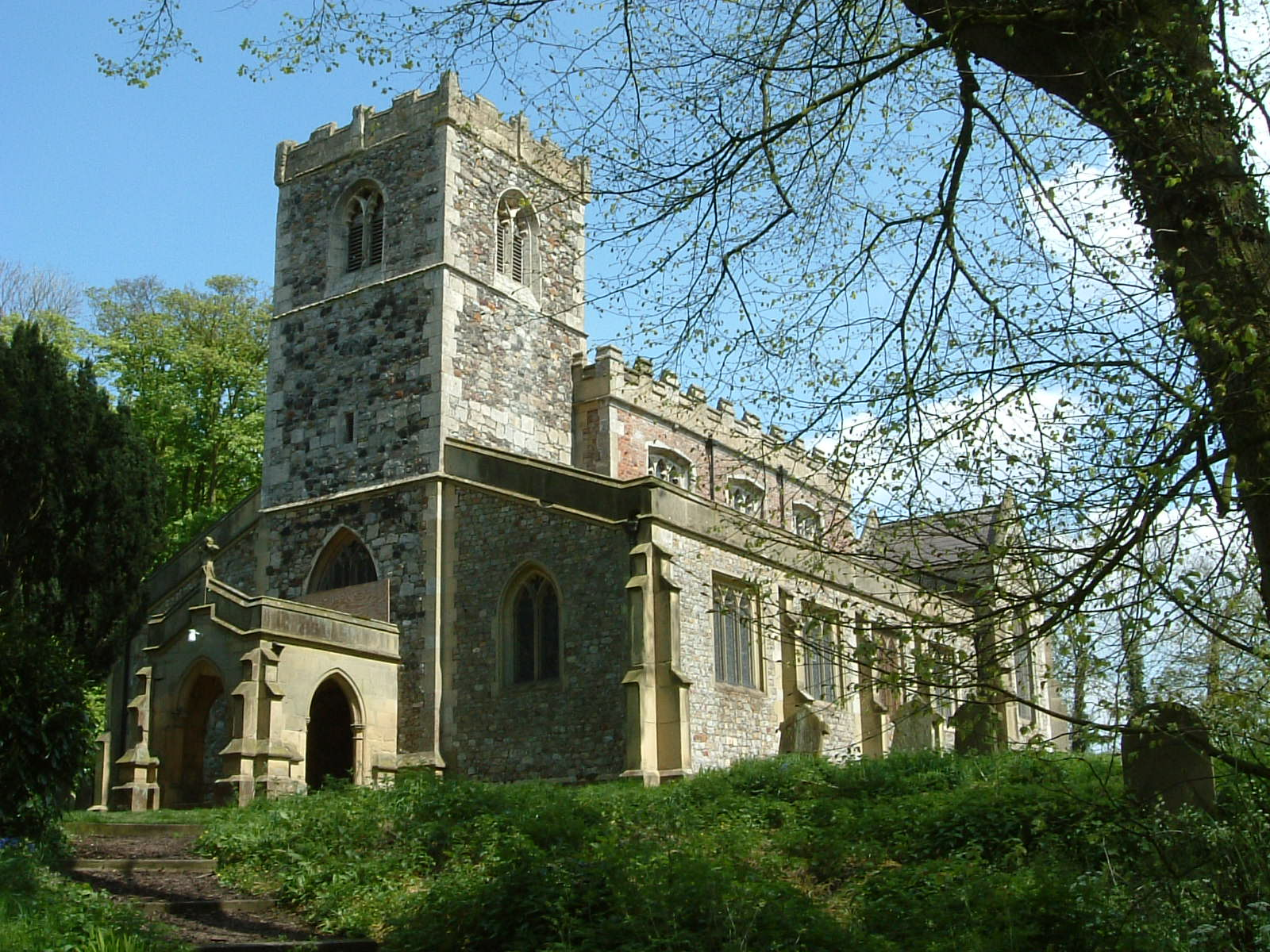
All Saints' Church, Roos

The civil parish is formed by the villages of Roos, Hilston and Tunstall, together with the hamlet of Owstwick. According to the 2011 UK census, Roos parish had a population of 1,168, an increase on the 2001 UK census figure of 1,113. The parish covers an area of 2,333.222 hectares (5,765.52 acres).

The Prime Meridian crosses the coast to the east of Roos.

The parish church of All Saints is a Grade I listed building.

== Governance ==
Roos is represented locally by Roos Parish Council while at county level is in the South East Holderness ward of the East Riding of Yorkshire Council. At a parliamentary level it is part of the Beverley and Holderness constituency which is represented by Graham Stuart of the Conservative Party.

== In popular culture ==
The meeting of Beren and Luthien in J. R. R. Tolkien's The Silmarillion and The Lord of the Rings, was written after the author and his wife visited a wood near to Roos. The "hemlocks" in the wood are said to have inspired his verse.

== See also ==
- Listed buildings in Roos
