= Listed buildings in Cayton =

Cayton is a civil parish in the county of North Yorkshire, England. It contains six listed buildings that are recorded in the National Heritage List for England. Of these, one is listed at Grade I, the highest of the three grades, and the others are at Grade II, the lowest grade. The parish contains the village of Cayton and the surrounding area, and the listed buildings consist of a church and houses.

== Key ==
Grade	Criteria
I	Buildings of exceptional interest, sometimes considered to be internationally important
II	Buildings of national importance and special interest

== Buildings ==
Name and location	Photograph	Date	Notes	Grade
St John the Baptist's Church; 54.23480°N 0.38049°W		12th century	The church has been altered and extended through the centuries, including the addition of the tower and north chapel in the 15th century, and a restoration in the 19th century. It is built in sandstone with a Welsh slate roof, and consists of a nave, a north aisle, a south porch, a chancel with a north chapel and vestry, and a west tower. The tower has three stages, diagonal buttresses, two-light flat-topped bell openings, and an embattled parapet with corner pinnacles. The gabled porch contains a round-arched Norman doorway that has two orders of shafts with scalloped capitals, and the arch with chevron decoration.	I
Killerby Old Hall; 54.23054°N 0.37110°W		Late 17th century	The house, which was refashioned in the 18th century, is in sandstone, with quoins, a moulded string course, and a hipped slate roof. There are two storeys, five bays, and it incorporates an earlier staircase tower on the left. The central doorway is approached by stone steps and has a divided fanlight, and the windows on the front are sashes; all these openings have splayed architraves. In the returns are mullioned and transomed windows, and the staircase tower has a blocked Tudor arched doorway and a mullioned window above.	II
87 Main Street; 54.23467°N 0.38142°W	—	1731	The house is in sandstone, and has a pantile roof with coped gables and kneelers. There are two storeys and four bays. The third bay projects, and contains a doorway above which is a sash window, both with keystones. The other windows are also sashes; those in the left two bays are tripartite.	II
86 Main Street; 54.23526°N 0.38351°W		Early to mid 18th century	The house is in sandstone, with a pantile roof and a coped gable and kneeler on the left. There are two storeys and two bays. The doorway is in the centre, and the windows are two-light horizontally-sliding sashes, those in the ground floor with timber lintels, and those in the upper floor with segmental brick arches.	II
82 and 84 Main Street; 54.23530°N 0.38372°W	—	Mid to late 18th century	A house in sandstone, with a pantile roof, a coped gable and kneeler on the right, and two storeys. On the front is a doorway, and windows that are a mix of casements and sashes, some of which are horizontally-sliding. All the openings have flat arches and raised keystones.	II
Whitfield Cottage; 54.23217°N 0.37557°W		Late 18th century	The house is in sandstone, and has a pantile roof with coped gables and moulded kneelers. There are two storeys and four bays. On the front are a recessed doorway and tripartite sash windows, all with stone sills and lintels with keystones.	II
