= Hutton Cranswick =

Village and civil parish in the East Riding of Yorkshire, England

Coordinates: 53°57′31″N 0°26′32″W

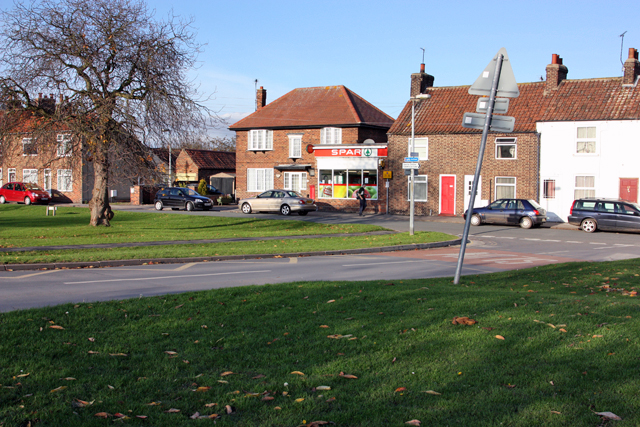
- Hutton Cranswick village Post Office (Sub-Post Office)

- Location within the East Riding of Yorkshire
- Population: 2,065 (2011 census)
- OS grid reference: TA023525
  - London: 170 mi (270 km) S
- Civil parish: Hutton Cranswick
- Unitary authority: East Riding of Yorkshire
- Ceremonial county: East Riding of Yorkshire
- Region: Yorkshire and the Humber
- Country: England
- Sovereign state: United Kingdom
- Post town: DRIFFIELD
- Postcode district: YO25
- Dialling code: 01377
- Police: Humberside
- Fire: Humberside
- Ambulance: Yorkshire
- UK Parliament: Bridlington and The Wolds

Hutton Cranswick is a village and civil parish in the East Riding of Yorkshire, England. It is situated approximately 3 miles (5 km) south from Driffield town centre, and on the A164 road.

The civil parish is formed by the village of Hutton Cranswick and the hamlets of Rotsea and Sunderlandwick. According to the 2011 UK Census, Hutton Cranswick parish had a population of 2,065, an increase on the 2001 UK Census figure of 2,015.

== History ==
The name Hutton derives from the Old English hōhtūn meaning 'settlement on a hill spur'. The name Cranswick probably derives from the Old English cranswīc meaning 'crane trading settlement', though it may derive from Cranocswīc meaning 'Cranoc's trading settlement'.

Hutton Cranswick is listed in the Domesday Book of 1086.

Within the village is the remnant of a 13th-century monastic moat beside Sheepman Lane, marking the site of a former Cistercian Grange belonging to Meaux Abbey near Beverley.

Less than 1 mile (1.6 km) north-west of Hutton are the remnants of Howe Hill Bronze Age round barrow. The 75 feet (23 m) diameter mound was excavated in 1892. Flint articles were found, and evidence of previous disturbance of the site, including burnt bones and a food vessel indicating a burial site. The mound later might have been used as a moot hill local meeting place. At the same site, to the north-west of Old Sunderlandwick Lane, is earthwork evidence of the deserted medieval village of Sunderlandwick—a settlement mentioned in the Domesday survey—with enclosures, hollow ways, ridges and furrows, and ditches.

In 1823 Hutton Cranswick was a civil parish in the Wapentake of Harthill. The parish church was under the patronage of Lord Hotham. There existed a Methodist chapel and a Sunday school. Population at the time was 917. Occupations included 19 farmers, two blacksmiths, two wheelwrights, two joiners, three shoemakers, four shopkeepers, three tailors, a rope maker, a butcher, a corn miller, and the landlords of The Pack Horse and the Decoy Inn public houses. Two carriers operated between the village and Hull, Beverley, and Driffield once a week.

The village railway station opened in 1846, as part of the Scarborough Branch Railway.

Under 1 mile south-west of Cranswick is the site of the Second World War military airfield RAF Hutton Cranswick, operational between 1942 and 1946. Aerial photographs show indications of landing strips and hangars.

The village's history is detailed in the locally authored A Tale of Two Villages, Hutton and Cranswick, a book written in 1980 and updated in 2000.

== Culture and community ==
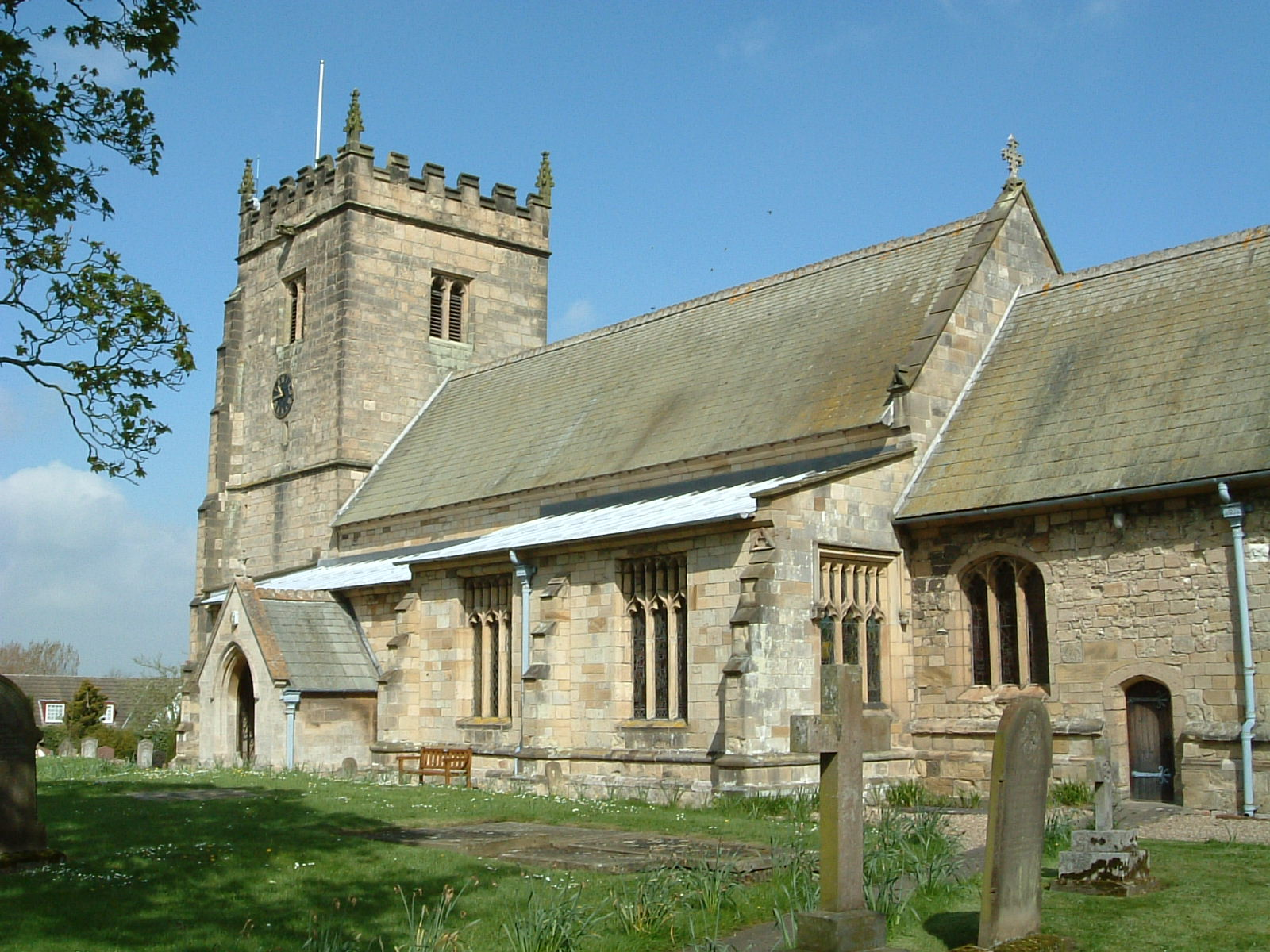
St Peter's Church, Hutton Cranswick

Originally comprising two villages, Hutton to the north, and Cranswick to the south, the expansion of the villages has merged them together to form a single village, Hutton Cranswick. However, the individual parts of the village are still often referred to by their separate names and both maintain their individual character.

Hutton Cranswick is a regular competitor in the yearly "Village in Bloom" competition. The Hutton Cranswick newsletter, The Bulletin, contains local information. The village held bonfire nights but these ceased because of lack of funding.

The Anglican St Peter's Church, Hutton Cranswick was designated a Grade II* listed building in 1966 and is now recorded in the National Heritage List for England, maintained by Historic England. The village school is Hutton Cranswick Community Primary School.

Cranswick local shops include one currently run by SPAR, a farm shop run by a local farming family, and a butchers. There is a public house, a garden centre, a hairdresser, a fish and chip shop and garages selling both cars and petrol. At the south-west of the village is an industrial estate with businesses including Cranswick Mill.

The large village green contains a pond, play-park area and mature trees. "Swinekeld Pit" (pronounced "Swinkle"), with a small stream, lies at the bottom of Southgate in Cranswick.

The village has a small railway station, served by Northern services on the Yorkshire Coast Line.

Blue Keld water spring and bottling plant is in the parish, 2 miles (3.2 km) south-east of Hutton Cranswick village.

== Sport ==
The village has its own sports area with football pitches, AstroTurf football and tennis courts, grass and hard tennis courts, and a social hall on Rotsea Lane. It also had a football club, Hutton Cranswick United, whose first team played in the Central Midlands League. However, in December 2011 the club ceased to exist. The only surviving football team in the village are Hutton Cranswick SRA, who play in Division Four of the East Riding County League. Hutton Cranswick United Under-14s were featured in the Sky Sports magazine after they lost 24–0 to Bridlington where every player in the 12-man Bridlington squad scored. The Association also has an Archery Club (Archers of East Riding), and a cricket club. The hall is used for children's soft play, youngsters' dance classes and a youth club. The village green was used to hold cricket matches that are now played east of the village on a field adjacent to the road Meggisons Turnpike.

== See also ==
- Listed buildings in Hutton Cranswick
