= Knipe Point =

Headland in North Yorkshire, England

Coordinates: 54.253°N 0.367°W

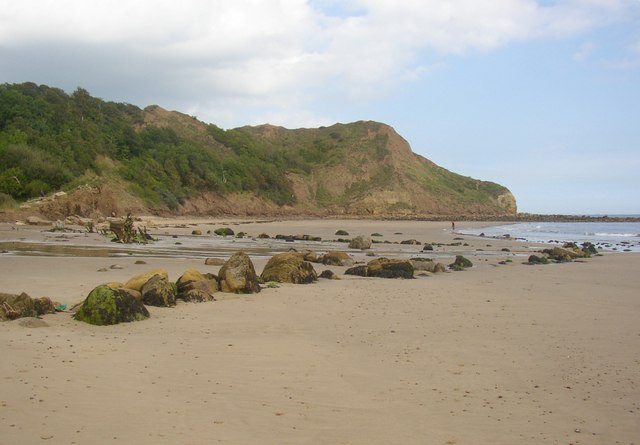
- Knipe Point viewed from the beach at Cayton Bay

- Location within North Yorkshire
- OS grid reference: TA0685
- Civil parish: Osgodby
- Unitary authority: North Yorkshire
- Ceremonial county: North Yorkshire
- Region: Yorkshire and the Humber
- Country: England
- Sovereign state: United Kingdom
- Post town: SCARBOROUGH
- Postcode district: YO11
- Dialling code: 01723
- Police: North Yorkshire
- Fire: North Yorkshire
- Ambulance: Yorkshire
- UK Parliament: Scarborough and Whitby

Knipe Point (or Osgodby Point) is a rocky headland on the North Sea coast, between Cornelian Bay and Cayton Bay in North Yorkshire, England. From this point, and running south, is the steeply sloping clay-till cliff on top of which stood the NALGO holiday camp between 1933 and 1974; this is where Knipe Point Drive was later built. The Cayton Cliff is subject to continuing surface landslips, potentially major at times, such as the one of 2008, known as the Knipe Point Landslide, which received national media attention due to the loss of three homes.

== History ==
Originally the first Trade Union holiday camp in the North of England, owned by NALGO, it opened its doors in 1933. It had 124 wooden bungalows, accommodating 252 visitors. A dining hall with waiter service, a rest room along with recreation rooms for playing cards, billiards, a theatre for indoor shows and dancing was also provided. The new centre also provided tennis courts and bowling greens, along with a children's play area. The visitors could walk to the beach where there was a sun terrace and beach house which also had a small shop.

Among the earliest visitors were the family of poet Philip Larkin. During the Second World War it became a home for evacuated children from Middlesbrough. The site became permanent residential homes in 1985 when a planning restriction limiting the site to holiday homes was overruled following an appeal by the owner of the site. The NALGO camp closed in 1974 and was later sold.

The history of the holiday camp can be found in Colin Ward and Dennis Hardy's book Goodnight Campers.

Click here to see photos of the NALGO camp from the 1930s. To see a black and white film of the NALGO holiday camp at Knipe Point please see the site of the Yorkshire Film Archive here.

== Current owners ==
A private housing estate consisting of bungalows with views onto the Cayton Bay Site of Special Scientific Interest (SSSI) to view photos of the SSSI click here.

The community is self-regulated by the Knipe Point Owners' Association which negotiated the purchase of the freehold of the land in 2002. This is held by another residents' company, Knipe Point Freeholders Limited, which maintains equality through each member having 500 shares. The members lease their homes to themselves for a nominal ground rent of £1. About half are permanent residents.

== Knipe Point landslide ==
Three homes were demolished in 2008 after an ancient landslide was re-activated due to a prolonged season of heavy rain. To see photos of the demolition click here.

The landslipping behaviour was investigated through a ground investigation and a geomorphological assessment, which identified groundwater movements through the coastal slope as the critical control on triggering of events. There is a great deal of speculation, including suggestions that the site has been affected by the building of a new bypass or that the construction of extensions to the bungalows triggered the failure.

On 15 December 2009 Defra announced that it was awarding Pathfinder Status to Scarborough Borough Council to enable it to add to its programme of work a means of exploring new approaches to planning for, and managing, adaptation to coastal change in partnership with the Knipe Point Drive community. This will run until spring 2011. Landslide report
