= Corn Exchange House =

House in Bridlington, East Riding of Yorkshire, England

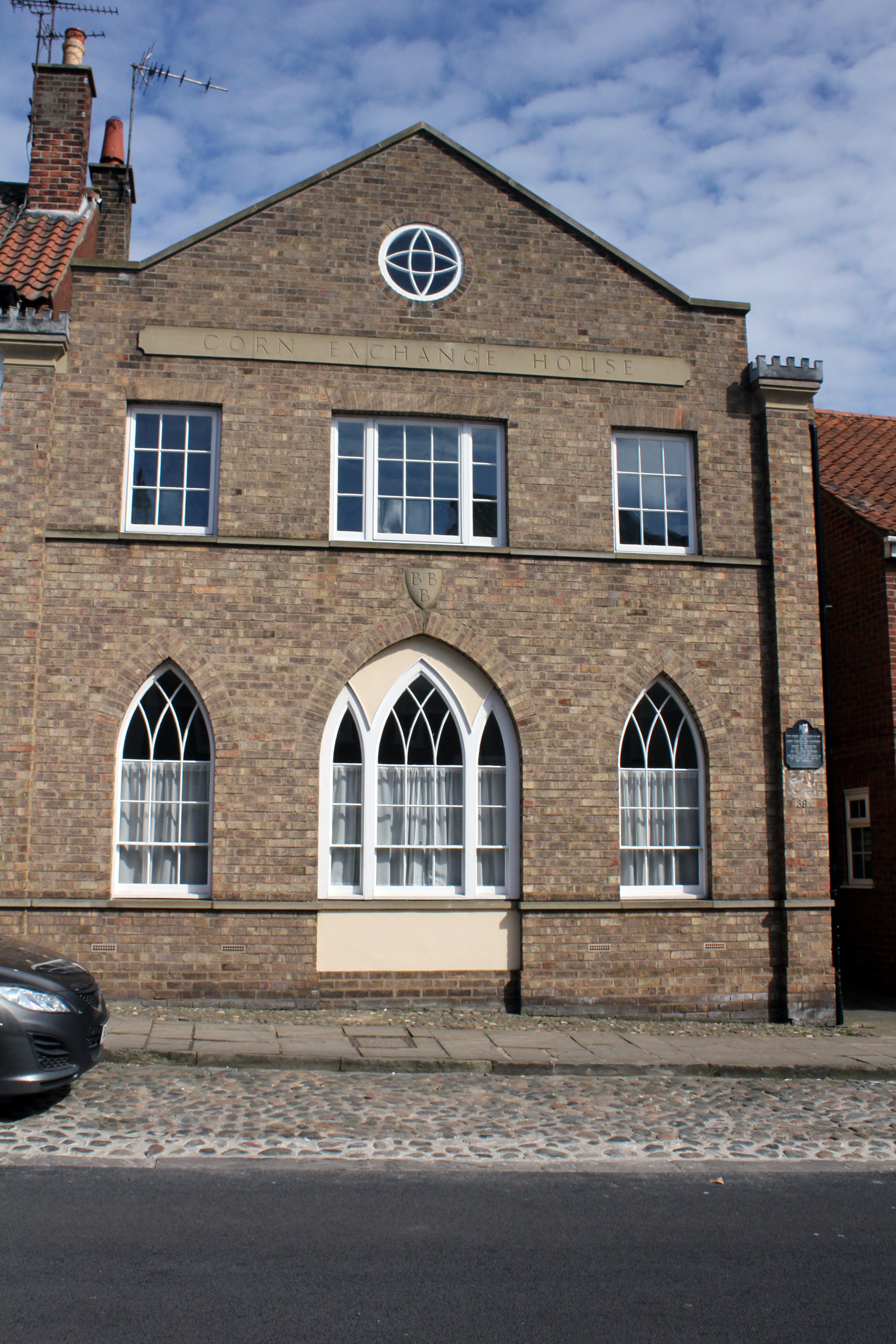
The building, in 2017

Corn Exchange House is a building in Bridlington, a town in the East Riding of Yorkshire, in England.

The house lies on the east side of the Market Place in Bridlington's Old Town. A corn exchange was erected on the site in 1824. It was three bays wide, with a stone front, Gothic revival windows and a pediment. In 1856, the town was described as having a considerable trade in corn, but by the 1870s, the building was little used.

In 1972, the corn exchange was demolished, and a house built on the site, to a design by Francis Johnson. It imitates the old building in its pointed windows and gable end, but is constructed of yellow brick.
