= Church of All Saints, Settrington =

Anglican church in North Yorkshire, England

Church of All Saints
- Church of All Hallows (alternative name)
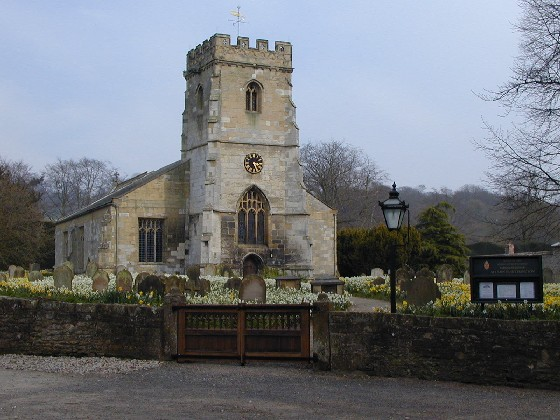
- Church of All Saints, Settrington
- Church of All Saints
- 54.1214°N 0.7174°W
- OS grid reference: SE839702
- Location: Settrington, North Yorkshire
- Country: England
- Denomination: Anglican

History
- Status: Active
- Dedication: All Saints
- Dedicated: c. 1823
- Earlier dedication: St Michael

Architecture
- Functional status: Parish church

Administration
- Diocese: Diocese of York
- Archdeaconry: York
- Deanery: Southern Ryedale
- Benefice: West Buckrose
- Parish: West Buckrose

Listed Building – Grade II*
- Designated: 10 October 1966
- Reference no.: 1173883

The Church of All Saints is an Anglican church in Settrington, North Yorkshire, England. It is a grade II* listed building which dates back to the 13th century and it was renovated at least twice in the 19th century. It was previously dedicated to St Michael.

== History ==
The church at Settrington is thought to date back to the 13th century, though some Norman remnants are contained within the church, however no mention is made in the Domesday Book of there being a place of worship at Settrington. A parson named only as Angot was recorded for the village between 1132 and 1137, and it is known that the village had a vicarage and a rectory, which were combined by Archbishop Gray in April 1248, so a place of worship at that date must have existed, with most of the church's current structure being able to be dated to the 13th century. A the time of the Norman Conquest, the manor and church for the parish were located at Buckton. The Norman lord who came to own the area around Settrington post 1086 built a church and a vicarage, and the church at Buckton which was mentioned in Domesday was abandoned, but the rectory or vicarage remained, and was grouped together with that at Settrington, with the living at Buckton becoming a sinecure.

Pevsner ascribes the bulk of the church to the 13th century and describes it as "..a large church with a Perpendicular west tower." The rest of the church is largely in the Perpendicular style except the south doorway which is Norman Transition in its style. Early descriptions of the tower detail it as having a steeple, though some have doubted that the tower ever did have a steeple. However, in 1723, a meeting held between the churchwardens, the clerk, curate and the Archdeacon of East Riding about the upkeep of the church required the church staff to carry out such duties as "...the ash tree growing upon the church porch to be stubbed up by the roots, as also the tree growing out of the steeple.." The tower is square, set in three stages of grey stone and is embattled. Glynne visited the church in 1842 and describes the steeple being similar to the steeple at Pickering.

The font dates to the 13th century and has a dwarf column at each angle. One of the panes of stained glass in the east window dates back to the 14th/15th centuries. The west window also has stained glass within it. The chancel was shortened in 1731 but Pearson's renovation of the late 1860s restored it to its original length.

The church was renovated in 1817 and again in 1823, when it was listed as being dedicated to St Michael, but by 1835, it is listed as being dedicated to All Saints. The church was occasionally known as All Hallows, an alternative name for the feast of All Saints. A second renovation was planned for 1861, but remained unexecuted, but between 1867 and 1868, a second design was undertaken by John Loughborough Pearson where the chancel was rebuilt and a new herringbone roof was installed.

In 1872, the wall at the east end was painted in encaustic to a design by Knowles of York. A new clock was erected in 1903 as a memorial to the recently deceased Lady Julia Middleton. The clock was made by W. Potts & Sons of Leeds.

Archdeacon Long is buried in the churchyard. Raph Tompson (or Thompson), one of Queen Elizabeth I's doctors is buried at Settrington church; he took over from Matthew Hutton. There is one Commonwealth War Grave in the churchyard.

== Clergy ==
Matthew Hutton came north from Ely in 1568 to be the Dean of York; he held a living in Nottinghamshire as well as the living at Settrington between 1568 and 1589. Hutton later became the Archbishop of York. During the Commonwealth era, John Carter was forcibly ejected from the church, though he did return to the ministry at Settrington some time later. It is thought that Carter was a high churchman, and so during the English Civil War, he was not well received by the villagers who supported the Parliamentarian cause. During the period that John Carter was dispossessed, Henry Hibbert was one of three priests who served Settrington. Between 1713 and 1716, Henry Egerton, later the Bishop of Hereford, was the rector of the parish.

Henry Todd was the priest at Settrington between 1830 and 1845, and Isaac Taylor was priest at Settrington between 1875 and 1901 (the year of his death).

== Parish and benefice ==
The church is in the parish and benefice of West Buckrose, which is part of the Deanery of Southern Ryedale, and in the Archdeaconry and Diocese of York. In the 19th century it was in the rural Deanery of Settrington (Note: The Rural Deanery of Settrington included the parishes of Birdsall, Burythorpe, Fridaythorpe, Heslerton East, Heslerton West, Knapton, Langton, North Grimston, Norton, Rillington, Scampston, Settrington, Sherburn, Thorpe Bassett, Wintringham, and Yedingham.) and the Archdeaconry of East Riding (Settrington was moved into North Yorkshire in 1974).

== See also ==
- Grade II* listed churches in North Yorkshire (district)
- Listed buildings in Settrington
