= Listed buildings in Settrington =

Settrington is a civil parish in the county of North Yorkshire, England. It contains 54 listed buildings that are recorded in the National Heritage List for England. Of these, two are listed at Grade II*, the middle of the three grades, and the others are at Grade II, the lowest grade. The parish contains the village of Settrington and the surrounding countryside. The listed buildings include a country house and associated buildings, houses, cottages and associated structures, farmhouses and farm buildings, a church, a former mill, and a telephone kiosk.

== Key ==
Grade	Criteria
II*	Particularly important buildings of more than special interest
II	Buildings of national importance and special interest

== Buildings ==
Name and location	Photograph	Date	Notes	Grade
Church of All Saints; 54.12148°N 0.71727°W		Late 12th to early 13th century	The church has been altered and extended through the centuries, there were repairs and a restoration in 1823, and further alterations in 1867–68 by J. Loughborough Pearson. It is built in sandstone with slate roofs, and consists of a nave, north and south aisles, a chancel and a west tower. The tower has three stages, a plinth, diagonal buttresses, string courses, and a west doorway with a pointed arch and a hood mould. Above it is a three-light Perpendicular window and two-light bell openings, all with hood moulds, a corbel table of fleurons and masks, and an embattled parapet pierced by quatrefoils over a band of flowing tracery, with heraldic shields.	II*
Canal northeast of Settrington House; 54.12225°N 0.71378°W	—	c. 1700	The canal is in the garden of the house, and has sandstone walls. These are about 0.5 metres (1 ft 8 in) in height, and form a canal about 80 metres (260 ft) long by 10 metres (33 ft) wide.	II
29–30 Village Street; 54.12401°N 0.72332°W	—	Late 17th or early 18th century (probable)	A pair of cottages combined into one house and later extended, the building is in limestone on a brick-faced plinth, with a brick eaves course and a pantile roof. There are two storeys and three bays. On the front are two doorways, and the windows are horizontally sliding sashes.	II
51 and 52 Village Street; 54.12537°N 0.72947°W	—	Early 18th century	A pair of cottages, later extended, in limestone, partly rendered, with a brick eaves course, and a pantile roof. There is one storey and an attic, four bays, and a lean-to on the left. On the front are two porches, some windows are top opening with wedge lintels, and others are horizontally sliding sashes.	II
Greystone House; 54.12256°N 0.72104°W	—	Early 18th century	The house, which has been altered and extended, is in limestone on a chamfered plinth, with quoins, a timber eaves course, paired eaves modillions, and a slate roof with coped gables and shaped kneelers. There are two storeys and an attic, seven bays, and rear extensions. The central doorway has a plain surround and a cantilevered hood, and the windows are sashes.	II
15 and 16 Chapel Road; 54.12585°N 0.72675°W	—	Mid-18th century	A pair of houses, later extended, in limestone on a plinth, with a brick eaves course, the extension in variegated brick, and a pantile roof. There are two storeys and five bays. On the front are two doorways, and the windows are casements. The ground floor openings have wedge lintels, and the upper floor lintels are in timber.	II
Inn House Farmhouse and outbuilding 54.12618°N 0.72693°W	—	Mid-18th century	Two cottages, at one time an inn, and later a farmhouse, incorporating earlier material, it is in limestone on a plinth, with a brick eaves course, and a pantile roof. There are two storeys, three bays, an outbuilding to the right with one storey and a loft, and a rear extension. On the front is a bracketed porch and a doorway with a fanlight, the windows are sashes, the ground floor windows with wedge lintels, and those on the upper floor with timber lintels. The outbuilding has windows, a stable door and a board door.	II
Green Farmhouse and outbuilding 54.12536°N 0.73103°W	—	Mid to late 18th century	The farmhouse, barn and cowshed are in limestone, with a brick eaves course and pantile roofs. The farmhouse has two storeys, five bays and a rear extension. There is a central doorway and mixed windows, including casements, horizontally sliding sash windows and a top opening window. The barn and cowshed have a stable door and other doorways, a pitching window and a fixed window.	II
32 Village Street; 54.12362°N 0.72318°W	—	Late 18th century	The house is in limestone, partly rendered and colourwashed, on a limestone plinth, with a timber eaves course and a pantile roof. There are two storeys and two bays. The doorway is in the centre, it is flanked by small-pane casement windows, and on the upper floor are small-pane horizontally sliding sashes. The ground floor openings have wedge lintels.	II
33 and 34 Village Street and garages 54.12349°N 0.72312°W	—	Late 18th century	A house and outbuilding, later two cottages and garages, In limestone on a plinth, with a brick eaves course, the upper part of the gable rebuilt in brick, and a pantile roof. There are two storeys and three bays, and a single-storey garage range to the right. On the front are two doorways, and the windows are casements.	II
36 Village Street and outbuilding 54.12326°N 0.72228°W	—	Late 18th century	The house is in limestone, with a brick eaves course and a pantile roof. There are two storeys, two bays, and a single-storey outbuilding to the left. The central doorway has a divided fanlight, the ground flor windows are later replacements, and on the upper floor are horizontally sliding sashes.	II
Brook Farmhouse; 54.12300°N 0.72379°W	—	Late 18th century	The farmhouse is in limestone, with a brick eaves course and a brick extension, and a pantile roof. There are two storeys and five bays and a rear extension. The doorway is in the centre, and the windows are a mix of horizontally sliding sashes and top opening windows. The doorway has a flat lintel, and the other openings have wedge lintels.	II
Harrisons Hire and Sales; 54.12676°N 0.72778°W	—	Late 18th century	A barn later used for other purposes, it is in limestone on a plinth, with a brick eaves course and a pantile roof. It has one storey and lofts, and six bays, with the gable end facing the street. It contains a segmental-headed cart arch of voussoirs, doorways, including stable doors, windows and pitching windows.	II
Mill House; 54.12150°N 0.72110°W	—	1790 (or earlier)	A mill and a mill house converted into two dwellings, in limestone on a plinth, with quoins, a brick eaves course, a rear extension in variegated brick, and a pantile roof with a coped gable and a shaped kneeler on the left. The house has two storeys and three bays, and the former mill has two storeys and an attic, and two bays. The house has a central doorway, and a blocked opening to the former wheel chamber. The windows in both parts are sashes, and the former mill has attic dormers. At the rear is a wide flat arch with a datestone above.	II
Outbuildings north of Settrington House; 54.12131°N 0.71710°W	—	c. 1790	The outbuildings are in limestone, with quoins on the right, a brick eaves course and a pantile roof. There is a single storey, and the central and end bays have a loft and pyramidal roof. The central bays project, and contain a doorway and horizontally sliding sash windows, and in the end bays are doors with divided fanlights. Most of the other windows have fixed lights.	II
Pavilion 10 metres north of Settrington House; 54.12104°N 0.71704°W	—	c. 1790	The garden pavilion is in limestone, with a brick eaves course, a pyramidal slate roof, and a square plan. It contains a plank door and a sash window. An opening in one wall is blocked and partly closed by timber doveholes.	II
Pavilion 20 metres north of Settrington House; 54.12116°N 0.71661°W	—	c. 1790	The garden pavilion is in limestone, with a brick eaves course, a pyramidal slate roof, and a square plan. It contains a plank door and a two-light fixed window opposite.	II
Pavilion 30 metres north of Settrington House; 54.12123°N 0.71715°W	—	c. 1790	The garden pavilion is in limestone, with a brick eaves course, a pyramidal slate roof, and a square plan. It contains a plank door and three twelve-pane sash windows.	II
Pavilion 40 metres north of Settrington House; 54.12132°N 0.71675°W	—	c. 1790	The garden pavilion is in limestone, with a brick eaves course, a pyramidal slate roof, and a square plan. It contains a 20th-century board door with doveholes.	II
Stable block east of Settrington House; 54.12077°N 0.71732°W	—	1791	The stable block, later used for other purposes, is in sandstone, with a timber eaves course and a slate roof. There are two storeys, a U-shaped plan, and a central range of seven bays, the central bays taller and on a plinth. The middle bay has a pyramidal roof with a ball finial, and contains a full-height round-headed carriage arch with imposts and a clock above, flanked by doors with pivoting fanlights. The windows have pivoting upper halves and all the openings have lintels with tripartite keystones. Beside the right doorway is a mounting block.	II
Riding School northwest of Settrington House; 54.12100°N 0.71740°W		1793	The building is in sandstone on a plinth, with a timber eaves course and an M-shaped slate roof, hipped on the left. There is a single-storey range of seven bays. The central bay is taller, with a loft, and a pyramidal roof with a ball finial. It contains a tall round-headed carriage arch with imposts and a lunette, and above is an oculus. The other bays form recessed blind arcades containing lunettes with pivoting centre lights. Inside, a pair of Doric columns support a lantern over the middle bay.	II*
Settrington Grange Farmhouse; 54.11369°N 0.72772°W	—	c. 1795	The farmhouse is in limestone on a plinth, with quoins and a hipped roof of stone flags with overhanging eaves. There are two storeys and three bays, and a lower slightly recessed single-bay wing on the right. The main block and wing have doorways with divided fanlights, and the windows are sashes, those in the wing horizontally sliding. All the openings have flat arches of voussoirs.	II
Farm buildings north of Settrington Grange Farmhouse; 54.11418°N 0.72766°W	—	c. 1795	The farm buildings consist of cart and implement sheds with lofts above, and are in limestone with quoins and slate roofs. There are two storeys and two parallel ranges. The right range has two elliptical cart arches of voussoirs, an impost band, windows, and external steps to a loft door. The left range has two similar arches, a lifting door and windows.	II
Settrington House; 54.12088°N 0.71653°W		c. 1795	A country house, it is in sandstone on a plinth. The garden front has two storeys and an attic, and a central block of three bays with a dentilled pediment containing an oculus. This is flanked by slightly recessed single-storey two-bay wings, recessed link bays, and gabled pavilions. In the middle of the central block is a round-arched doorway with a rusticated surround, and imposts with paterae. The windows are sashes, with a sill band on the upper floor. The flanking wings have a dentilled cornice, and contain sash windows. On the linking bays are panelled parapets, and the pavilions have pedimented gables. They contain rebuilt Venetian windows, flanked by round-headed niches, and with a sill band. The entrance front has a central doorway with an eared architrave, it is approached by a double staircase, and has an eared architrave. The front also contains sash windows, a Venetian oriel window, and a dentilled pediment with a tripartite lunette.	II
1 Village Street; 54.12613°N 0.73333°W		c. 1800	The house is in limestone on a plinth, with a brick eaves course and a pantile roof. There are two storeys and three bays, and a single-storey lead-to on the right. The doorway is approached by steps, there is one replacement window, and the other windows are horizontally sliding sashes.	II
2 and 3 Village Street; 54.12618°N 0.73195°W	—	c. 1800	A pair of houses in limestone on a plinth, with a brick eaves course and a pantile roof. There are two storeys and four bays. On the front are two doorways, there is one horizontally sliding sash windows, and the others are casements.	II
5 Village Street and outbuiilding 54.12621°N 0.73122°W	—	c. 1800	The house is in limestone on a plinth, with a brick eaves course and a pantile roof. There are two storeys and three bays, and a single-storey garage and outbuilding to the right. On the front is a doorway, and the windows are sashes, those to the left of the doorway horizontally sliding. The outbuilding has double doors and a horizontally sliding sash window.	II
6 and 7 Village Street; 54.12630°N 0.73038°W	—	c. 1800	A pair of houses in limestone on a plinth, with a brick eaves course and a tile roof. There are two storeys and four bays. Each house has a central doorway, and all the windows are replacements with two lights.	II
10 and 11 Village Street; 54.12659°N 0.72816°W	—	c. 1800	A pair of houses in limestone on a plinth, with a brick eaves course and a pantile roof. There are two storeys and four bays, and a rear single-storey outshut. On the front are two doorways, and the windows are a mix of casements, and sashes.	II
14 Village Street; 54.12634°N 0.72704°W	—	c. 1800	The house is in limestone on a plinth, with a brick eaves course and a pantile roof. There are two storeys and two bays, and an outshut. The doorway is in the centre, and the windows are small-pane casements. The ground floor windows have wedge lintels, and the upper floor lintels are in timber.	II
17, 18 and 19 Village Street and outbuildings 54.12605°N 0.72332°W	—	c. 1800	A terrace of three cottages in limestone, with a brick eaves course and a pantile roof. There are two storeys and six bays, and single-storey outbuildings on each side. All the cottages have a central doorway, and the windows are a mix of casements and horizontally sliding sashes, and there is a cross window. The ground floor openings have wedge lintels, and the upper floor lintels are in timber.	II
20, 21 and 22 Village Street and outbuildings 54.12539°N 0.72311°W	—	c. 1800	A terrace of four, later three, cottages in limestone, the right gable wall rendered, with quoins, a brick eaves course and a pantile roof. There are two storeys and six bays, and a rear single-storey rear lean-to outbuilding on each cottage. One cottage has a central porch and the others have central doorways. The windows are a mix of casements and horizontally sliding sashes. The ground floor openings have wedge lintels, and the upper floor lintels are in timber. On the right gable end is a canted bay window.	II
23 and 24 Village Street and outbuildings 54.12455°N 0.72317°W	—	c. 1800	A pair of cottages in limestone, with quoins, a brick eaves course and a pantile roof. There are two storeys and four bays, flanked by single-storey lean-to outbuildings. Each cottage has a central doorway, the windows in the left cottage are casements, and in the right cottage they are horizontally sliding sashes. The ground floor openings have wedge lintels.	II
25 and 26 Village Street and outbuildings 54.12455°N 0.72317°W	—	c. 1800	A pair of cottages in limestone, with quoins, a brick eaves course and a pantile roof. There are two storeys and four bays, and each cottage has a single-storey rear lean-to outbuilding. Each cottage has a central doorway approached by steps, and horizontally sliding sash windows. The ground floor openings have painted wedge lintels, and on the upper floor they have timber lintels. Number 25 also has brick outbuildings.	II
27 and 28 Village Street and outbuildings 54.12427°N 0.72297°W	—	c. 1800	A pair of cottages in limestone, with quoins, a brick eaves course and a pantile roof. There are two storeys and four bays, and rear extensions. Each cottage has a central doorway and top-opening small-pane windows. The ground floor openings have painted wedge lintels, and on the upper floor they have timber lintels.	II
35 Village Street and outbuilding 54.12333°N 0.72300°W	—	c. 1800	The house and outbuilding, later a garage, is in limestone, with a brick eaves course and a pantile roof. There are two storeys, two bays, and a single-storey garage to the left. The doorway is in the centre, and the windows are sashes.	II
38 and 39 Village Street; 54.12240°N 0.72304°W	—	c. 1800	A pair of cottages in limestone, with quoins, a brick eaves course, and a pantile roof. There are two storeys, four bays, a single-storey lean-to extension on the left, and a rear outshut. On the front are two doorways, there are small-pane casement windows on the left house, the upper floor of the right house, and on the extension, and the lower floor of the right house has 20th-century cross windows. The ground floor openings have painted wedge lintels, and on the upper floor the lintels are in timber.	II
40 and 41 Village Street; 54.12263°N 0.72335°W	—	c. 1800	A pair of cottages in limestone, with quoins, a brick eaves course and a pantile roof. There are two storeys and four bays, and each cottage has a rear outshut. Both cottages have a central doorway, and the windows are a mix of small-pane casements, and small-pane horizontally sliding sashes. The ground floor openings have wedge lintels, and the upper floor lintels are in timber.	II
42 and 43 Village Street; 54.12372°N 0.72432°W	—	c. 1800	A pair of cottages in limestone, with a brick eaves course, an outbuilding partly in brick, and a pantile roof. There are two storeys and four bays, a rear lean-to outbuilding, and a single-storey outshut. On the front are two doorways, the left house has horizontally sliding sash windows, and the windows on the right house are casements. The ground floor openings have wedge lintels, and the upper floor lintels are in timber.	II
44 and 45 Village Street; 54.12407°N 0.72453°W	—	c. 1800	A pair of cottages in limestone, with a brick eaves course, an outbuilding in brick, and a corrugated asbestos roof. There are two storeys and four bays. Each cottage has a central doorway and the windows are horizontally sliding sashes. The ground floor openings have wedge lintels, and the upper floor lintels are in timber. At the rear, one cottage has a lean-to outbuilding, and the other has a single-storey outshut with a catslide roof.	II
46 and 47 Village Street; 54.12446°N 0.72471°W	—	c. 1800	A pair of cottages in limestone, with a brick eaves course, an outbuilding in brick, and a pantile roof. There are two storeys and four bays. Each cottage has a central doorway, and the windows are a mix of casements and horizontally sliding sashes. The ground floor openings have wedge lintels, and the upper floor lintels are in timber. Each cottage has a rear single-storey lean-to outbuilding.	II
48 and 49 Village Street; 54.12480°N 0.72488°W	—	c. 1800	A pair of cottages in limestone, with a brick eaves course, and a pantile roof. There are two storeys and four bays, a single-storey lean-to on the left, and a single-storey outbuilding to the right. On the front are two doorways, the left house and the upper floor of the right house have casement windows, and the windows on the ground floor of the right house are horizontally sliding sashes. The ground floor openings have wedge lintels, and the upper floor lintels are in timber.	II
50 Village Street, shops and garage 54.12532°N 0.72509°W	—	c. 1800	A farmhouse and barn, later converted into a house, shops and garage. It is in limestone with quoins, a brick eaves course, and a pantile roof. There are two storeys and an L-shaped plan. The house has two bays, a central doorway with a casement window to the right, and the other windows are horizontally sliding sashes. The other range, at right angles, has four bays, a shopfront, garage doors, and on the upper floor are horizontal sliding sash windows. The ground floor openings have painted wedge lintels, and the upper floor lintels are in timber.	II
Bellwood; 54.12621°N 0.73136°W	—	c. 1800	The house is in limestone, with a brick eaves course and a pantile roof. There are two storeys and two bays. The central doorway is approached by semicircular stone steps, the windows have top opening lights, and the ground floor openings have heavy painted lintels.	II
Blacksmith's House and garage 54.12377°N 0.72324°W	—	c. 1800	The building is in limestone on a plinth, with a brick eaves course and a pantile roof. There are two storeys and three bays, and a single-storey range on the left. Steps lead up to the doorway, the windows are casements, and all the openings have wedge lintels. In the single-storey range are two garage doors, a doorway and a window.	II
Elm Tree Farmhouse; 54.12647°N 0.72899°W	—	c. 1800 (or earlier)	The farmhouse, later a private house, is in limestone on a plinth, with a brick eaves course and a pantile roof. There are two storeys and four bays. On the front is a doorway, and the windows are a mix of casements, and sashes, some horizontally sliding.	II
Farm buildings west of Elm Tree Farmhouse; 54.12642°N 0.72937°W	—	c. 1800	The buildings consist of a barn, a cartshed and byres, with lofts above. They are in limestone with a brick eaves course, and pantile roofs, and form two ranges at right angles. The range on the street has two storeys and four bays, and the rear range has one storey and lofts, and six bays. The front range has two pitching windows, a fixed window and a doorway. The rear range has pitching windows and slit vents, and the cartshed has segmental-arched openings with brick piers and limestone imposts.	II
Fisher Farmhouse and barn 54.12618°N 0.73229°W	—	c. 1800	The farmhouse and attached barn to the left are in limestone on a plinth, with a brick eaves course and pantile roof. The farmhouse has two storeys and three bays, and the barn has one storey and a loft, and two bays. On the front is a doorway, and the windows are a mix of casements, and horizontally sliding sashes.	II
Langthorne Cottage; 54.12319°N 0.72221°W	—	c. 1800	The house is in limestone, with a brick eaves course, and pantile roof with a coped gable and kneeler on the right. There are two storeys, two bays, and a later rear extension. The central doorway has a divided fanlight, and the windows are casements.	II
The Cobblers; 54.12654°N 0.72722°W	—	c. 1800	A pair of cottages, later combined into one, in limestone on a plinth, with a brick eaves course and a pantile roof. There are two storeys and four bays. On the front are two doorways, and the windows are casements. The ground floor openings have painted wedge lintels.	II
8 and 9 Village Street; 54.12651°N 0.72870°W	—	1801	A pair of houses in limestone on a plinth, with a brick eaves course and a pantile roof. There are two storeys and attics, four bays, and a rear extension on the right. The windows are a mix of small-pane casements, and small-pane horizontally sliding sashes, and there are two gabled dormers with plain bargeboards.	II
Farm buildings east of Woodhouse Farmhouse; 54.10486°N 0.68679°W		c. 1840 (or earlier)	The buildings consist of lambing pens and a shepherd's hut. They are in limestone and red brick with pantile roofs. The pens are in two ranges at right angles, with the hut at the right end. The pens are open fronted with brick piers and buttresses. The hut is a single room, with its opening into the pens, and a two-light window.	II
Glebe House; 54.12265°N 0.72066°W	—	Mid-19th century	The house is in limestone on a plinth, with quoins, and a slate roof with coped gables and shaped kneelers. There are two storeys and four bays. In the centre is a doorway with a quoined surround. The windows are sashes, some with a chamfered quoined surround and mullions. At the rear is a mullioned and transomed bay window with a coped parapet, and a three-light mullioned and transomed window to the left.	II
Telephone kiosk 54.12495°N 0.72443°W	—	1935	The telephone kiosk is of the K6 type designed by Giles Gilbert Scott. Constructed in cast iron with a square plan and a dome, it has three unperforated crowns in the top panels.	II
