= Hutton Cranswick railway station =

Railway station in the East Riding of Yorkshire, England

Hutton Cranswick
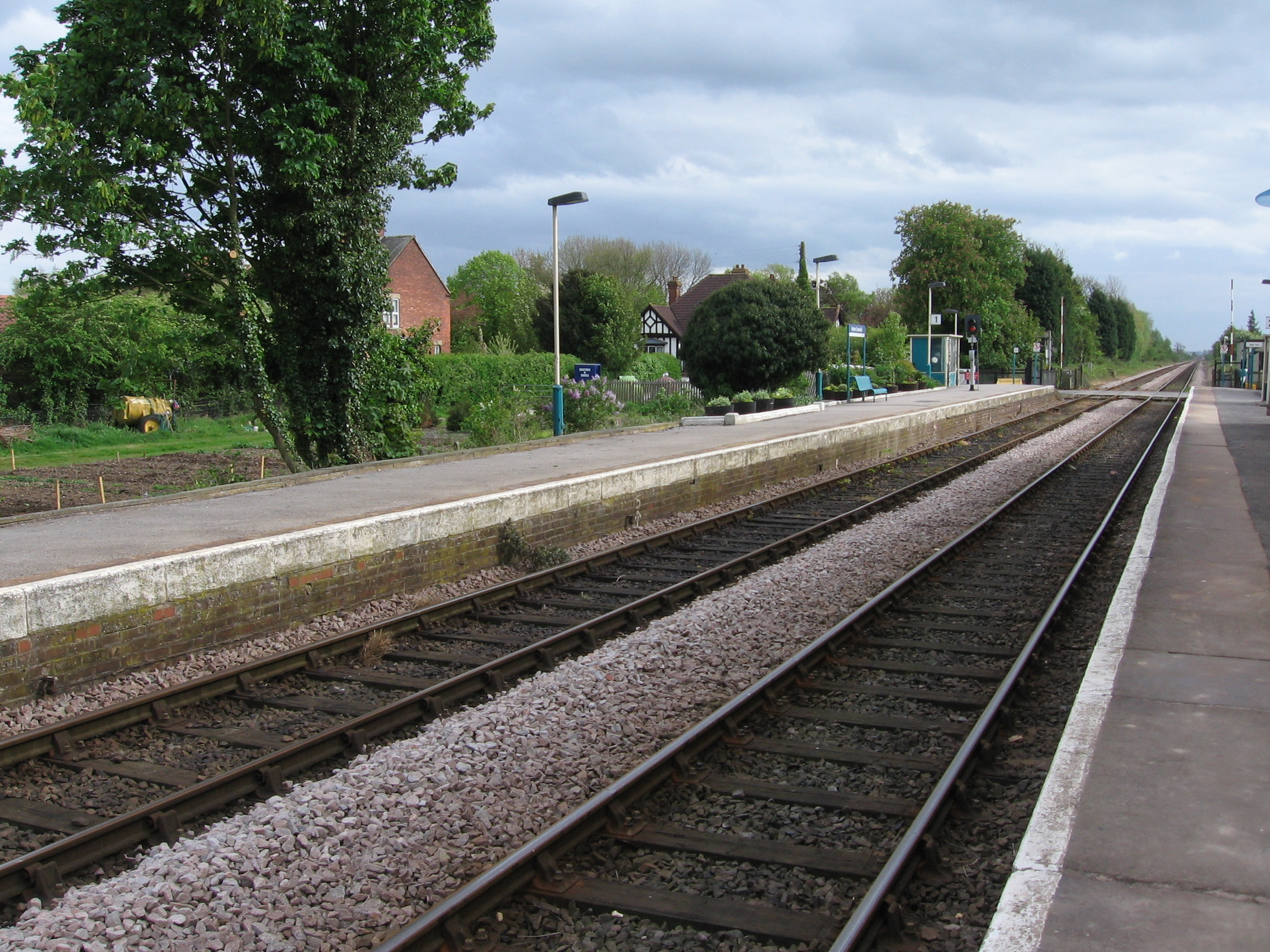

General information
- Location: Hutton Cranswick, East Riding of Yorkshire; England
- Coordinates: 53.956000°N 0.432000°W
- Grid reference: TA028522
- Manager: Northern
- Platforms: 2

Other information
- Station code: HUT
- Classification: DfT category F2

History
- Opened: 6 October 1846

Passengers
- 2021/22: ▲31,934
- 2022/23: ▲36,368
- 2023/24: ▼35,988
- 2024/25: ▲44,492
- 2025/26: ▲53,418
Location
Notes
- Passenger statistics from the Office of Rail and Road

Hutton Cranswick railway station serves the village of Hutton Cranswick in the East Riding of Yorkshire, England. It is located on the Yorkshire Coast Line, 16 1/4 miles (26 km) north of Hull and is operated by Northern who provide all passenger train services.

The station has retained its main buildings, though they are now in residential use. It is unstaffed, but a recent addition is an electronic ticket machine on the Southbound platform, where passengers can purchase or collect tickets. There are shelters and timetable posters on each platform and step-free access is available to both (the southbound one via the automatic level crossing at the Hull end).

== Services ==
The station has a basic hourly service on weekdays to Hull and York southbound and Bridlington northbound, with additional calls at peak periods and certain trains running through to/from Scarborough. Sundays also see an hourly service in each direction to Scarborough and to Sheffield via Hull.

== See also ==
- Listed buildings in Hutton Cranswick

Preceding station	National Rail	Following station
Arram	Northern Yorkshire Coast Line	Driffield
Historical railways
Lockington Station closed; Line open	Y&NMR Hull and Scarborough Line	Driffield
