= John Carter (priest) =

English Anglican priest

John Carter was an Anglican priest.

Carter was born in Luton and educated at Trinity College, Cambridge. He was ordained on 19 September 1630. He was Rector of Settrington from 1641 to 1646; and Archdeacon of Chester from 1660 until his death. A plaque on the wall of Settrington church details his death to be 28 February in either 1666, or 1667.

Between 1644 and 1662, Carter was ejected (dispossed) from his living at Settrington; he was re-instated around the time of the Reformation.
