= Cornelian Bay =

Cornelian Bay may refer to:

- Cornelian Bay, North Yorkshire, near Scarborough, North Yorkshire, England
- Cornelian Bay, Tasmania, a suburb of Hobart, Tasmania, Australia
- Cornelian Bay, former name of Carnelian Bay, California, United States
