= Cayton =

Village and civil parish in North Yorkshire, England

Coordinates: 54°14′07″N 0°23′00″W

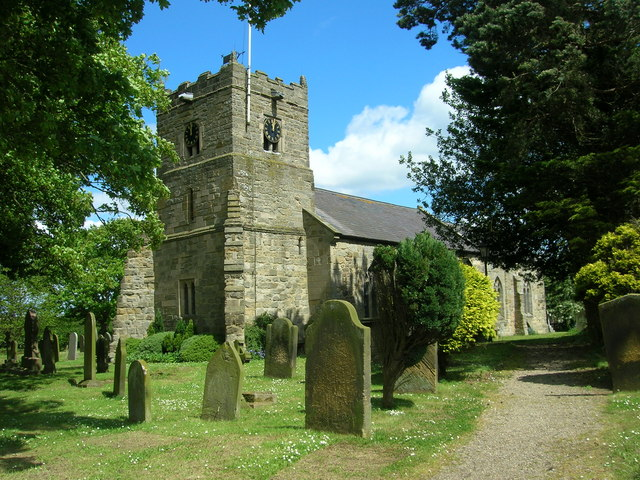
- St John the Baptist's Church, Cayton

- Location within North Yorkshire
- Population: 2,328 (2011 census)
- OS grid reference: TA053833
  - London: 185 mi (298 km) S
- Civil parish: Cayton
- Unitary authority: North Yorkshire
- Ceremonial county: North Yorkshire
- Region: Yorkshire and the Humber
- Country: England
- Sovereign state: United Kingdom
- Post town: SCARBOROUGH
- Postcode district: YO11
- Dialling code: 01723
- Police: North Yorkshire
- Fire: North Yorkshire
- Ambulance: Yorkshire
- UK Parliament: Scarborough and Whitby

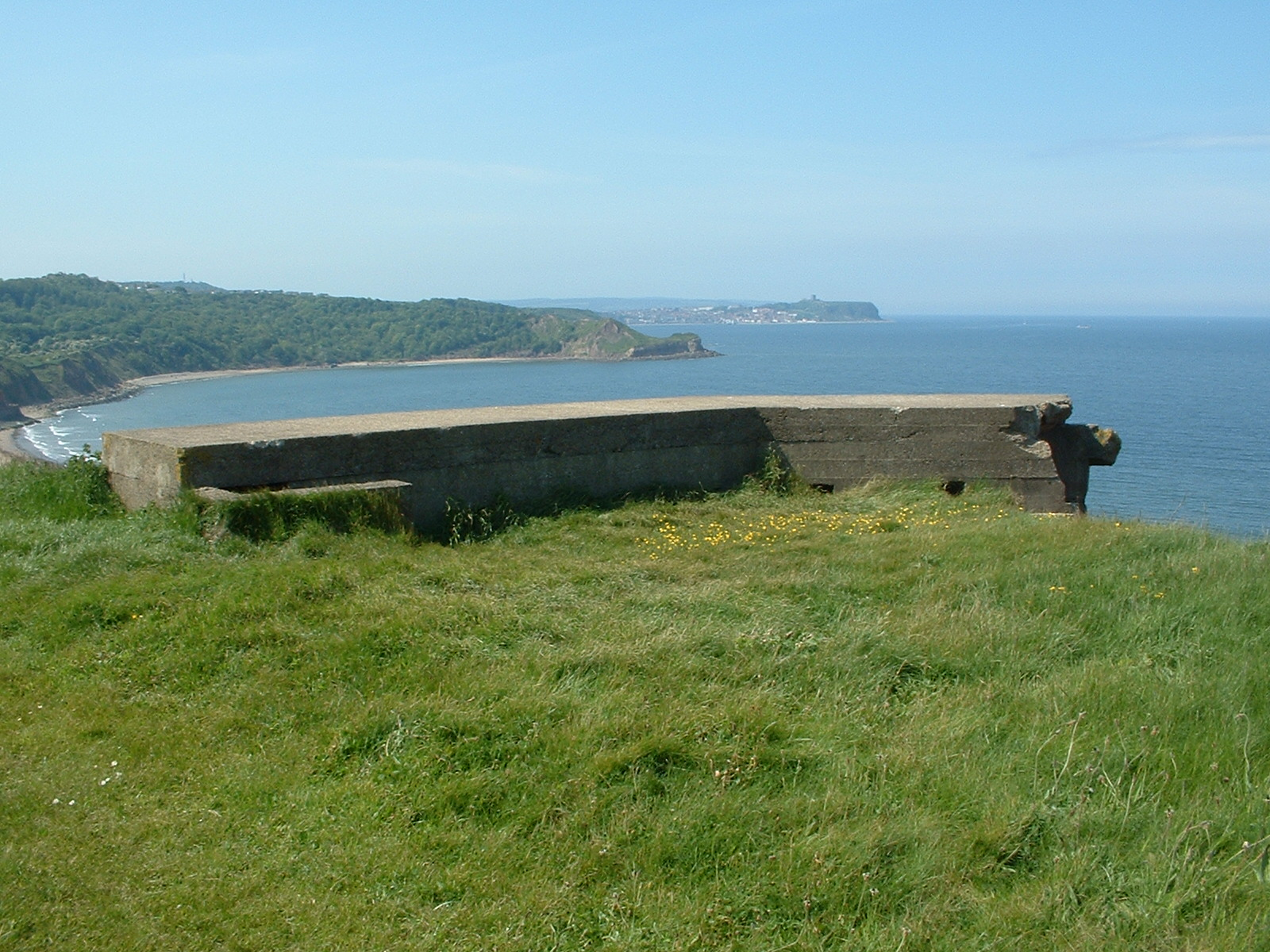
Section post, badly affected by coastal erosion, Cayton Bay.

Cayton is a village and civil parish in North Yorkshire, England, 4 miles (6 km) south of Scarborough.

== History ==
Cayton is mentioned in the Domesday Book as Caitune.

In 2010, Cayton won a Silver-gilt, at the Britain in Bloom awards. This was achieved despite earlier sabotage attacks on a number of flower beds in the village.

=== Second World War ===
Second World War defences were constructed around Cayton. They included a section post and several pillboxes. Many of the remaining defences have been subject to coastal erosion.

The village sent 45 men to the First World War, and 60 to the Second. There was not a single fatality amongst the combined 105 men, with only one soldier suffering a serious injury during the First World War, then being subsequently spared by a German Officer.

=== Cayton Bay Landslide ===
In April 2008, a major landslip caused tons of earth to slip down the cliff side at the edge of Cayton Bay close to Osgodby, leaving bungalows on the Knipe Point estate teetering on the edge of the cliff. The slope movements, caused by water seeping through the clay cliffs, resulted in three properties being demolished and other properties in the Knipe Point Estate and the A165 Filey Road being threatened. A number of the remaining homes are still at risk as the slope and the National Trust land below it are designated as a Site of Special Scientific Interest (SSSI); despite an initial outlay of £90,000 by Scarborough Borough Council and the National Trust an engineered solution could not be found that would satisfy the technical, environmental and cost-effective criteria set by Natural England, the Environment Agency and Defra.

== Governance ==
An electoral ward of the same name exists. The population of this ward at the 2011 UK census was 4,152. Cayton parish had a population of 2,328 a decrease on the 2001 UK census figure of 2,407.

From 1974 to 2023 it was part of the Borough of Scarborough, it is now administered by the unitary North Yorkshire Council.

== Community ==
Cayton County Primary School educates pupils aged 4 to 11 years.

Cayton Bay forms one of a series of large sweeping sandy bays on the edge of the North Yorkshire National Park which run from Bridlington in the south to Whitby in the north. There is a surf shop and car park on the cliff tops above the bay.

Cayton railway station on the Yorkshire Coast Line from Hull to Scarborough served the village until it closed on 5 May 1952.

== Notable people ==
The village is the birthplace of Mikey North, who portrays Gary Windass, in Coronation Street. North attended the nearby George Pindar School.

== See also ==
- Listed buildings in Cayton
