= St John the Baptist's Church, Cayton =

Parish church in Cayton, North Yorkshire, England

Coordinates: 54°14′05″N 0°22′50″W

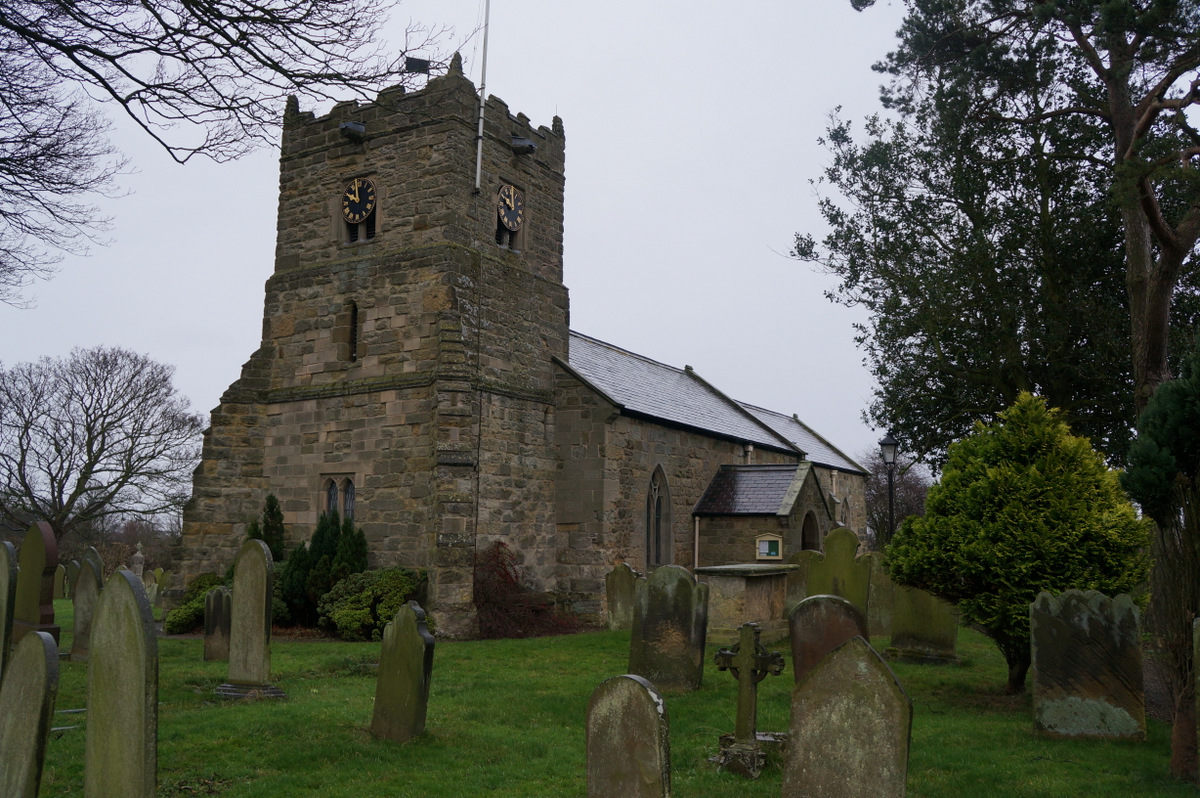
The church, in 2014

St John the Baptist's Church is the parish church of Cayton, a village in North Yorkshire, in England.

The church was constructed in the 12th century, from which period the chancel, north aisle, and part of the nave date. In the 15th century, the nave was extended, and a tower and north chapel were added. There was at one time a vault, which has since been filled in. In 1947, a clock was installed on the tower, celebrating that it was believed to be one of the doubly Thankful Villages. The church was Grade I listed in 1967.

The church is built of sandstone with a Welsh slate roof, and consists of a nave, a north aisle, a south porch, a chancel with a north chapel and vestry, and a west tower. The tower has three stages, diagonal buttresses, two-light flat-topped bell openings, and an embattled parapet with corner pinnacles. The gabled porch contains a round-arched Norman doorway that has two orders of shafts with scalloped capitals, and the arch with chevron decoration.

Inside the church is a slightly pointed 12th-century arcade, and a 12th-century font on a 19th-century base. The wooden door and doorframe to the tower date from 1678. There is a slab on the chancel floor with a brass inscription dating from 1452, and there are also some 18th-century monuments. There is an 18th-century charity board, and the oak communion table is 17th century.

== See also ==
- Grade I listed buildings in North Yorkshire (district)
- Listed buildings in Cayton
