= George Pindar School =

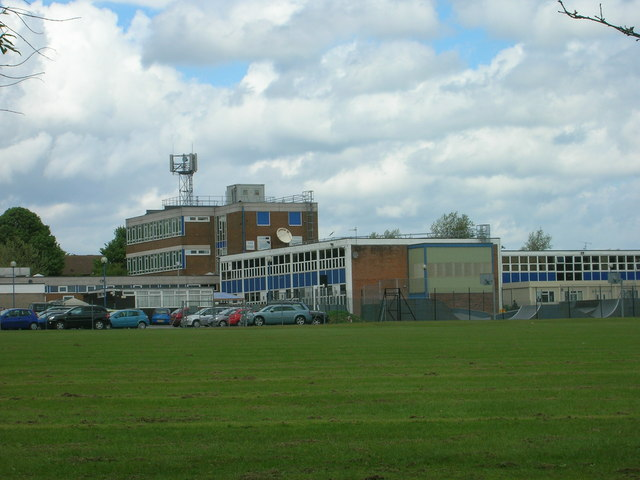
- The school in 2009

Location
- Moor Lane; Eastfield; Scarborough, North Yorkshire, YO11 3LW; England; 54.23875°N 0.39328°W

Information
- Type: Academy
- Local authority: North Yorkshire
- Department for Education URN: 146819 Tables
- Ofsted: Reports
- Gender: Coeducational
- Age: 11 to 16
- Enrolment: 645 (June 2018)
- Capacity: 939 (June 2018)
- Website: https://gps.hslt.academy/

George Pindar School is a coeducational secondary school in Eastfield, Scarborough in North Yorkshire, England. It was previously named George Pindar Community Sports College (GPCSC), but during 2012 the school reverted to its original name.

In September 2025 the school was taken over by the Heartwood Learning Trust and is now registered as an academy. Principal is Jonny Willis.

== Notable alumni ==
- Mikey North, (actor)
- Danny Price, (cruiserweight boxer)
- Darren Wood, (footballer)
