= Eastfield, North Yorkshire =

Town and civil parish in North Yorkshire, England

Coordinates: 54°14′25″N 0°23′48″W

Eastfield
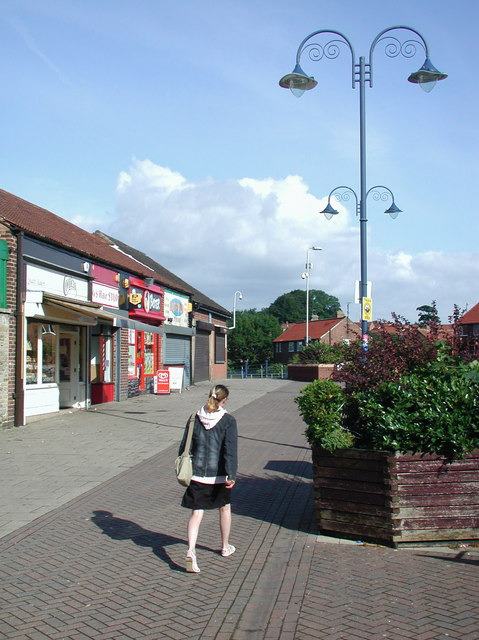
- Eastfield High Street

- Location within North Yorkshire
- Population: 7,178 (2021 census)
- OS grid reference: TA046839
- Civil parish: Eastfield
- Unitary authority: North Yorkshire
- Ceremonial county: North Yorkshire
- Region: Yorkshire and the Humber
- Country: England
- Sovereign state: United Kingdom
- Post town: SCARBOROUGH
- Postcode district: YO11
- Dialling code: 01723
- Police: North Yorkshire
- Fire: North Yorkshire
- Ambulance: Yorkshire
- UK Parliament: Scarborough and Whitby

Eastfield is a town and civil parish in North Yorkshire, England. It was granted town status in January 2016. It is directly south of Scarborough and is sometimes described as one of its suburbs.

According to the 2011 UK census, Eastfield parish had a population of 5,610, a reduction on the 2001 UK census figure of 5,863. The town council is Eastfield Town Council. The population for Eastfield according to the 2021 UK census was returned as 7,178.

From 1974 to 2023 it was part of the Borough of Scarborough, it is now administered by the unitary North Yorkshire Council.

The area has a mid-size Industrial Park (Olympian Trading Park), the rapidly expanding Scarborough Business Park, and Plaxton Park is on the outskirts of Eastfield. The area is the base for a number of large businesses, for example Plaxton, Raflatac, Unison, Cooplands, Mainline Menswear, Sik Silk, Schneider Electric and Dale Power Solutions. The largest factory in the vicinity is McCain Foods. Boyes, a discount department store chain which has over 80 stores across the UK has its head office and warehouse facilities here.

Eastfield was home to local commercial radio station Yorkshire Coast Radio which broadcast to Scarborough, Filey, Bridlington and Whitby on FM and DAB, until its closure.

George Pindar School is the local secondary school for Eastfield and the surrounding vicinity. Holy Nativity Church, Eastfield is the town's Anglican church, and St George's Church, Scarborough is the Catholic church.

In April 2021, Historic England announced the discovery of an important Roman residential site during a survey for a new housing estate, suggesting it to be either a religious sanctuary, a luxury villa or combination of both. It is a type of building layout not known of elsewhere in Britain. Within hours of the announcement of the discovery, people trespassed onto the site and caused damage to the building. The discovery of the site caused a reduction of planned homes, from approximately 150 to 94.
