= Hilston =

Village in the East Riding of Yorkshire, England

Coordinates: 53.783008°N 0.045740°W

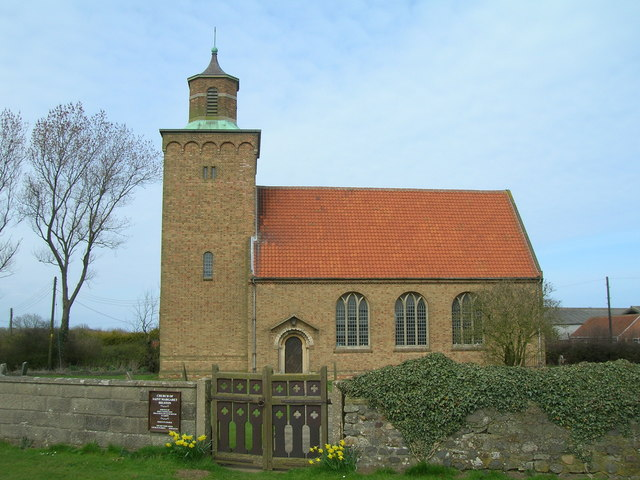
- St Margaret's Church, Hilston

- Location within the East Riding of Yorkshire
- OS grid reference: TA288336
  - London: 155 mi (249 km) S
- Civil parish: Roos
- Unitary authority: East Riding of Yorkshire
- Ceremonial county: East Riding of Yorkshire
- Region: Yorkshire and the Humber
- Country: England
- Sovereign state: United Kingdom
- Post town: HULL
- Postcode district: HU11
- Dialling code: 01964
- Police: Humberside
- Fire: Humberside
- Ambulance: Yorkshire
- UK Parliament: Beverley and Holderness

Hilston is a village in the civil parish of Roos, in the East Riding of Yorkshire, England, near the North Sea coast in an area known as Holderness. It is situated approximately 12 miles (19 km) east of Kingston upon Hull city centre and 5 miles (8 km) north-west of Withernsea. It lies to the east of the B1242 road. In 1931 the parish had a population of 27.

The name Hilston derives from the Old Norse personal name Hidolf, or perhaps the Old English Hidwulf, and the Old English tūn meaning 'settlement'.

== Governance ==
On 1 April 1935 the parish was abolished and merged with Roos, Hilston is now represented locally by Roos Parish Council while at county level is in the South East Holderness ward of the East Riding of Yorkshire Council. At a parliamentary level it is part of the Beverley and Holderness constituency which is represented by Graham Stuart of the Conservative Party.

== Landmarks ==
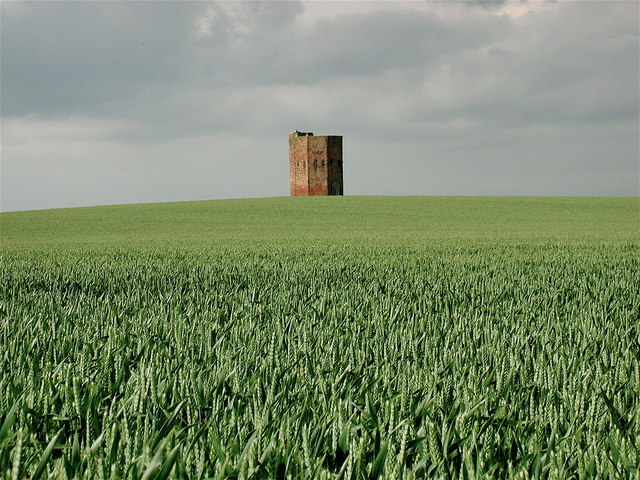
Admiral Storr's Tower, near Hilston

An octagonal tower, known as Admiral Storr's Tower, that was built in 1750 as a folly for John Storr and is designated a Grade II listed building and recorded in the National Heritage List for England, maintained by Historic England.

The Anglican church is dedicated to St Margaret and was built 1956–57 to designs by Francis Johnson to replace the church destroyed by a Second World War bomb in August 1941.

== See also ==
- Listed buildings in Roos
