= Francis Johnson (architect) =

English architect

See Francis Johnston (architect) for Irish architect with a similar name.

Francis Frederick Johnson CBE (18 April 1911 – 29 September 1995), was an English architect born in Bridlington in the East Riding of Yorkshire. He was active in designing churches and country houses and restoring historic buildings.

== Education and early career ==
Johnson studied at the Leeds School of Architecture and then toured Europe in 1931 on a travelling scholarship before joining the firm of Allderidge & Clark in Hull. He started his own practice in 1937 in his home town of Bridlington. This was interrupted by the Second World War, when he served in the Royal Engineers from 1943 to 1946.

== Work ==
Francis Johnson's favoured field of work was domestic architecture. He is known particularly for country houses in a Georgian style. He designed a number of churches in the post-war period for clients, including the Church of England Commissioners. These simple buildings often show the influence of the Scandinavian classical architecture he had admired on his European tour.

Francis Johnson also restored and remodelled a large number of historic buildings, including Hardwick Hall, Derbyshire, Belton House, Lincolnshire, Burton Agnes Hall, East Yorkshire, and Fairfax House, York. His approach to restoration involved detailed research into the original colour schemes of buildings, which was a concern ahead of his time in the 1960s.

=== Churches ===
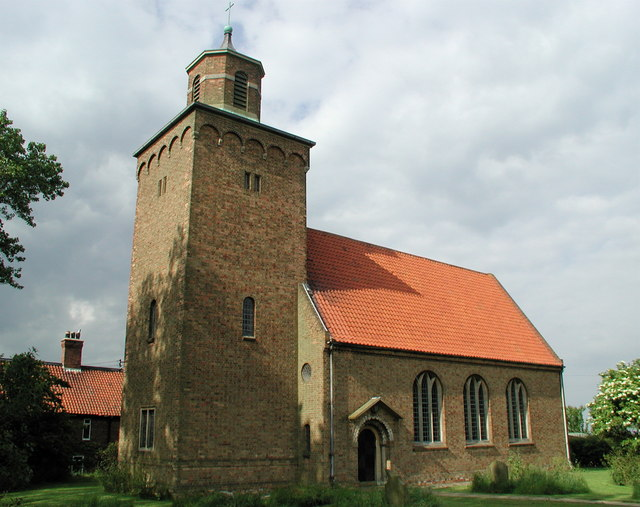
St Margaret's Church, Hilston

- St Margaret, Hilston, East Riding of Yorkshire (1956–1957)
- Ascension, Calvert Road, Kingston upon Hull chancel (1957–1958)
- St Michael and All Angels, Orchard Park, Kingston upon Hull (1957–1958)
- Holy Nativity Church, Eastfield, North Yorkshire (1954–1955)
- St Luke's RC, Scarborough, North Yorkshire (1955–1956)
- St George's Church, Scarborough, North Yorkshire (1957–1958)
- Methodist Chapel, Ripon (1958–1960)
- St Joseph's Church, Newby, Scarborough, North Yorkshire (1958–1960)
- Methodist Church, Sewerby (1963)
- St Thomas, Pennywell, Sunderland (1964)
- St Christopher, Tong, West Yorkshire (1967–1968)
- St Luke, Willerby (1968)

=== Private houses ===
- The Old Rectory, Winestead restoration (1947–1948)
- Sunderlandwick Hall, Sunderlandwick (1962–1963)
- Settrington House, Settrington rebuilt after fire in 1963 (1965)
- Whitwell-on-the-Hill, Malton (1969)
- Corn Exchange House, Bridlington (1972)
- Garrowby Hall, Garrowby south range (1981–1982)
- Hilborough House, Norfolk designed 1989–90 (1996–2000)

=== Other ===
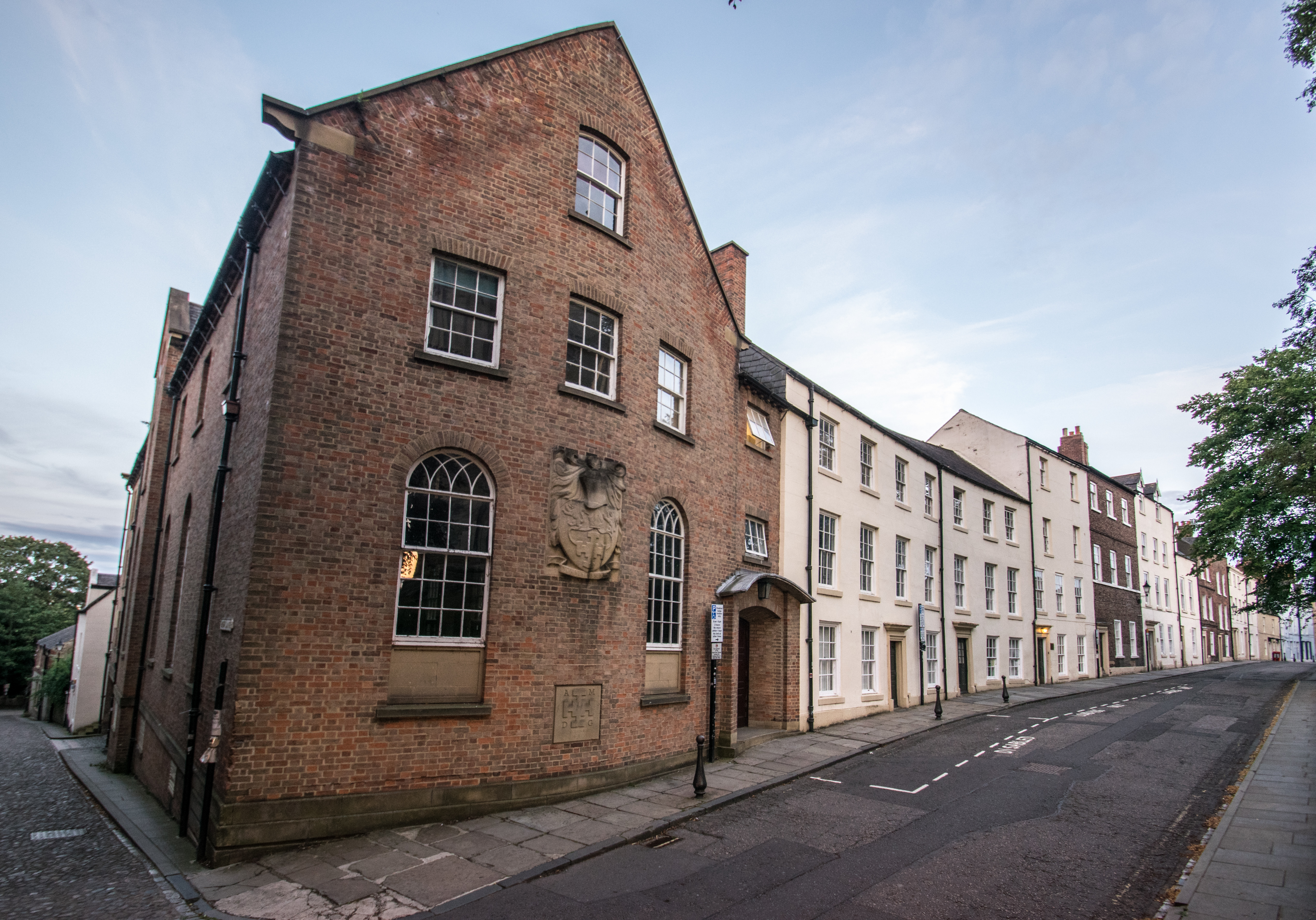
St Chad's College, Durham, with Johnson's 1961 dining hall in the foreground

- The King's School, Tynemouth, Northumberland new block (1959–1960)
- St Anne's Houses, Bridlington (1961–1965)
- St Chad's College, Durham (1961–1964)
- Beach House, Grenada (1968–1969)
- Rectory, Church Green, Bridlington (1970)
- Rectory, Cottingham, East Riding of Yorkshire (1973)
- The Pavilion (Opera House), Thorpe Tilney Hall, Lincolnshire (1976–1980)
- Swimming Pool Pavilion, Burton Agnes Hall (1985)

=== Archives ===
Part of Johnson's archives were deposited with Hull University Archives at the Hull History Centre. In November 2013 these secured an award of £32,729 from the National Cataloguing Grants Programme administered by The National Archives. The project to catalogue and make the material available was undertaken between January 2014 and August 2015.

The remaining papers, drawings and photographs were deposited at the Hull History archive in June and July 2022 when the continuing practice, Francis Johnson and Partners, was dissolved on the retirement of the surviving partners.
