= Sunderlandwick =

Hamlet in the East Riding of Yorkshire, England

Coordinates: 53.985592°N 0.453565°W

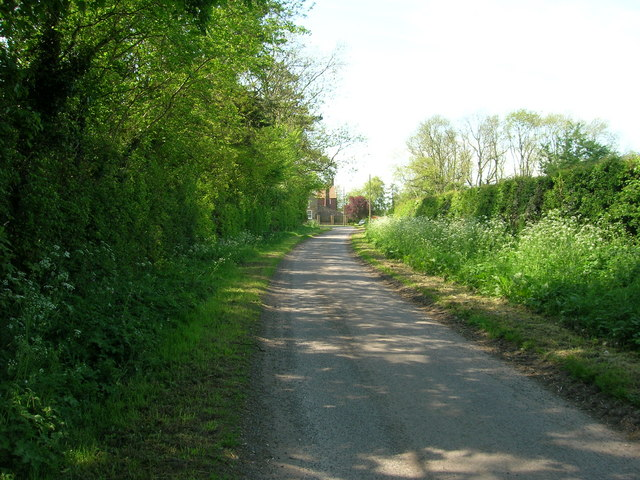
- Track to Old Sunderlandwick

- Location within the East Riding of Yorkshire
- OS grid reference: TA015555
- Civil parish: Hutton Cranswick
- Unitary authority: East Riding of Yorkshire
- Ceremonial county: East Riding of Yorkshire
- Region: Yorkshire and the Humber
- Country: England
- Sovereign state: United Kingdom
- Post town: DRIFFIELD
- Postcode district: YO25
- Dialling code: 01377
- Police: Humberside
- Fire: Humberside
- Ambulance: Yorkshire
- UK Parliament: Bridlington and The Wolds

Sunderlandwick is a hamlet in the civil parish of Hutton Cranswick, in the East Riding of Yorkshire, England. It is situated approximately 1.5 miles (2.4 km) south of Driffield and lies to the west of the A164 road.

Sunderlandwick House and its associated stables was designated a Grade II listed building on 15 July 1998. It is the former home of the Horner and Reynard families, and was sold to Lord Fearnley after the house was requisitioned by the army for war-time efforts, and subsequently accidentally burned down during VJ Day celebrations. The engraving 'EHR' can still be seen in some buildings around the estate, referring to Edward Horner-Reynard, the owner.

Driffield Golf Club is actually in Sunderlandwick despite the name.

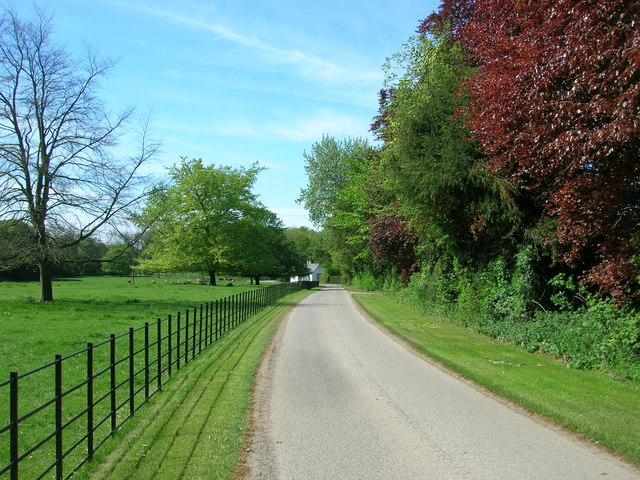
Drive to Sunderlandwick House ( 53°59'6.23"N 0°26'58.08"W ). The house was built in 1962–63 for Sir Thomas Ferens on the site of an earlier Georgian house, Sunderlandwick Hall, altered in 1840s and burnt down on VJ Day, 1945.

== History ==
The name Sunderlandwick derives from the Old English sundorlandwīc meaning 'trading settlement on set-apart land'.

Sunderlandwick was formerly a township in the parish of Hutton-Cranswick, in 1866 Sunderlandwick became a separate civil parish, on 1 April 1935 the parish was abolished and merged with Hutton Cranswick. In 1931 the parish had a population of 50.

== See also ==
- Listed buildings in Hutton Cranswick
