= List of buildings by William Burges =

William Burges (1827–1881) was an English architect, born in London. He trained under Edward Blore and Matthew Digby Wyatt. His works include churches, a cathedral, a warehouse, a university, a school, houses and castles. Burges's most notable works are Cardiff Castle, constructed between 1866 and 1928, and Castell Coch (1872–91), both of which were built for John Crichton-Stuart, 3rd Marquess of Bute.

For most of the century following his death, Victorian architecture was neither the subject of intensive study nor sympathetic attention and Burges's work was largely ignored. However the revival of interest in Victorian art, architecture, and design in the later twentieth century has led to a renewed appreciation of Burges and his work.

The list includes all known buildings by Burges, and significant alterations or additions made by him to existing structures. Unexecuted designs are not listed.

== Key ==
Grade	Criteria
Grade I	Buildings of exceptional interest, sometimes considered to be internationally important.
Grade II*	Particularly important buildings of more than special interest.
Grade II	Buildings of national importance and special interest.
"—" denotes a work that is not graded.

== Works ==
Name	Location	Photograph	Date	Notes	Grade
Cardiff Castle	Cardiff, Wales		1866–1928	For John Crichton-Stuart, 3rd Marquess of Bute	I
Mount Stuart House Oratory	Isle of Bute, Scotland		1873–75	For John Crichton-Stuart, 3rd Marquess of Bute	A (Scotland)
Castell Coch	Cardiff, Wales		1871–91	For John Crichton-Stuart, 3rd Marquess of Bute	I
The Tower House	Holland Park, London		1875–81	For himself	I
Park House, Cardiff	Cardiff, Wales	Park House	1871–80	For James McConnochie, Chief Engineer to Lord Bute	I
Knightshayes Court	Tiverton, Devon	Knightshayes Court	1867–74	For Sir John Heathcoat-Amory	I
Church of Christ the Consoler	Skelton-on-Ure, North Yorkshire	Church of Christ the Consoler	1870–76	For George Robinson, 1st Marquess of Ripon	I
St Mary's, Studley Royal	North Yorkshire	St Mary's, Studley Royal	1871–78	For George Robinson, 1st Marquess of Ripon	I
Choristers' House	Studley Royal, North Yorkshire	The Choristers House, Studley Royal	1873	Estate cottages or former parsonage for George Robinson, 1st Marquess of Ripon	II*
Saint Fin Barre's Cathedral	Cork, Ireland	Saint Fin Barre's	1863–1904	For the Bishop of Cork	-
Worcester College Chapel	Oxford		1864–69	Redecoration of the chapel	I
Treverbyn Vean	St Neot, Cornwall		1858–62	House for Colonel C L Somers Cocks	II*
Gayhurst House	Gayhurst, Buckinghamshire		1858–65	Alterations for Lord Carrington. The image shows the Cerberus Privy.	II*
Bewholme Vicarage	Bewholme, East Riding of Yorkshire	Former rectory in Bewholme, East Riding of Yorkshire. Designed by William Burges.	1859	Vicarage for an unknown patron	II
Maison Dieu, Dover	Dover, Kent	Maison Dieu	1859–75	For the burgesses of Dover	II*
Waltham Abbey Church	Waltham Abbey, Essex		1859–79	Restoration	I
All Saints Church	Fleet, Hampshire		1861–62	For Charles Edward Lefroy. Greatly damaged in an arson attack in 2015.	II*
Church of St Helen	Kilnsea, East Riding of Yorkshire		1864-65	Partly paid for by Burges's father, Alfred	II
Church of St Michael and All Angels	Lowfield Heath, Surrey		1867–68	"A veritable anthology of Burgesian 'dodges'"	II*
Tomb of Charles Spencer Ricketts	Kensal Green, London		1867-68	For Julia Bonnor, in memory of her father	II*
Oakwood Hall	Bingley, West Yorkshire		1864–65	For Thomas Garnett	II
Church of St Margaret of Antioch	Darenth, Kent		1866–68	Restoration	I
Church of All Saints	Murston, Kent		1872–73	Incomplete	II
Church of St Nicholas	Charlwood, Surrey		1864–67	Restoration	I
Church of St John the Baptist	Outwood, Surrey		1869	"Plain spoken to the point of bluntness"	II
Milton Court	Dorking, Surrey		1869–80	Restoration and rebuilding for Lachlan Mackintosh Rate	II*
Trinity College	Hartford, Connecticut, United States of America		1873–82	For President Abner Jackson	-
Anglican Church	Mariánské Lázně, Czech Republic		1879	For Mrs Anna Scott	-
Old School House	Winchfield, Hampshire		1860–61	Now a private residence	-
Salisbury Cathedral Chapter House	Salisbury, Wiltshire		1855–59	Restoration with Henry Clutton	I
Yorke Almshouses	Forthampton, Gloucestershire	Yorke Almshouses. Forthampton, Gloucestershire, England, Great Britain	1863–64	For Joseph Yorke	II
Church of St Michael and All Angels	Brighton, East Sussex		1868	For the Reverend Charles Beanlands	I
St Mary's of the Assumption	Moulsoe, Buckinghamshire		1870	Remodelled chancel and added east window.	II
Screen enclosing the Carrington graves at St Mary's of the Assumption	Moulsoe, Buckinghamshire		1870	Remodelled chancel and added east window.	II
Chevithorne Vicarage	Chevithorne, Devon		1870–71	For Sir John Heathcoat-Amory	II
Speech Room, Harrow School	Harrow, London		1871–77	For the governors of Harrow School	II*
St Anne's Court, Model Lodgings	Soho, London	St. Anne's Court in the early 1960s	1864–66	For Lachlan Mackintosh Rate. Since demolished	-
Skilbeck's Warehouse	Upper Thames Street, London	Skilbeck's Warehouse	1865–66	For the Skilbeck brothers. Since demolished	-
Church of St Peter, Carrigrohane	Carrigrohane, County Cork, Ireland	St Peter's, Carrigrohane, County Cork, Ireland	1865–68	For the Right Reverend Robert Gregg	-
Elizabeth Almshouses, Worthing	Worthing, West Sussex	Elizabeth Almshouses, Worthing	1859–60	For his father, Alfred Burges	II
Holy Trinity Church Templebreedy	Crosshaven, County Cork, Ireland	Holy Trinity Church, Templebreedy, County Cork, Ireland	1866–68	For the Right Reverend Robert Gregg	-
Church of St James, Winscombe	Winscombe, Somerset		1863–64	Chancel restoration and stained glass for the Reverend John Augustus Yatman	I
Gates and gate piers east of Newby Hall	Skelton-on-Ure, North Yorkshire		1870	Gates and gate piers at Newby Hall, Yorkshire for Lady Mary Vyner	II
St Faiths Stoke Newington	Stoke Newington, London		1872–73	Damaged by a flying bomb in World War II and subsequently demolished	-
Church of St John, Cumnock	Cumnock, East Ayrshire, Scotland		1878–80	For Lord Bute	B (Scotland)
