= Listed buildings in Bewholme =

Bewholme is a civil parish in the county of the East Riding of Yorkshire, England. It contains six listed buildings that are recorded in the National Heritage List for England. All the listed buildings are designated at Grade II, the lowest of the three grades, which is applied to "buildings of national importance and special interest". The parish contains the village of Bewholme, the hamlet of Nunkeeling, and the surrounding countryside. The listed buildings consist of houses, a wayside cross, a ruined church and a former chapel.

== Buildings ==
Name and location	Photograph	Date	Notes
Wayside Cross; 53.93345°N 0.25931°W		Medieval	The stump of the cross stands beside a cottage on the roadside. It is of gritstone and consists of a tapering, four-sided chamfered shaft with a carved date.
The Manor House; 53.93216°N 0.23060°W		Early 18th century	The house is in orange brick on a plinth, with stone dressings and a pantile roof. There are two storeys and four bays. In the centre is a gabled porch with tumbled-in brickwork on the gable and a stone finial. It contains a round-arched doorway in a reeded architrave with rosettes, and imposts. The windows are tripartite with segmental arches.
Bewholme Hall; 53.93692°N 0.22297°W	—	c. 1800	The house is in rendered brick, on a plinth, with a floor band, oversailing eaves and a hipped slate roof. There is a main block of two storeys and three bays, flanking linked lower two-storey one-bay pavilions with pyramidal roofs, an outshut and a rear wing. On the front is a Tuscan porch and a doorway with a decorated radial fanlight. The windows are sashes, those on the pavilions with round heads. On the linking walls are doorways with fanlights.
St Mary Magdalene and St Helena's Church; 53.93482°N 0.25674°W		1810	The church, which was rebuilt using older materials, is in brick faced with stone and cobbles, and is in a ruined condition without a roof. It consists of a two-bay nave and a single-bay chancel. The west door has a round head, the chancel has an east window of three stepped lancets, and the nave windows are pointed with small keystones.
Primitive Methodist Chapel; 53.93269°N 0.22583°W		1839	The former chapel is in red and grey brick with a hipped slate roof. There are two storeys, a square plan and fronts of two bays. On the ground floor are two round-headed doorways with radial fanlights. The windows are sashes, those on the front with round-arched heads. Between the upper floor windows on the front is an inscribed and dated stone panel.
The Old Vicarage; 53.93323°N 0.22604°W		1859	The vicarage, later a private home, was designed by William Burges. It is in red brick, with stone dressings, a chamfered floor band, overhanging eaves on curved and chamfered flying brackets, and a slate roof. There are two storeys and attics, and five bays. The lean-to porch has an open timber frame, and doorway with a pointed head and a hood mould. The cross windows have mullions with shouldered lintels, those in the ground floor under relieving arches. There is a stair tower on the left, the gables have bargeboards with pierced quatrefoils, and on the roof are three raking dormers.
