= Dunnington (disambiguation) =

Dunnington is a village near the city of York, England. It may also refer to:

== Places ==
- Dunnington, East Riding of Yorkshire, England
- Dunnington, Indiana, USA
- Dunnington, Warwickshire, England

== People with the name ==
- Angus Dunnington (born 1967), English chess player
- G. Waldo Dunnington (1906–1974), American biographer, professor, and translator
- Jason Dunnington (born 1977), American politician
- Sir John Dunnington-Jefferson, 1st Baronet (1884–1979), English soldier and politician
- John W. Dunnington (1833–1882), American and Confederate naval officer

== Other uses ==
- Dunnington, an Intel processor
