= Bewholme Primitive Methodist Chapel =

Building in the East Riding of Yorkshire, England

Coordinates: 53°55′58″N 0°13′33″W

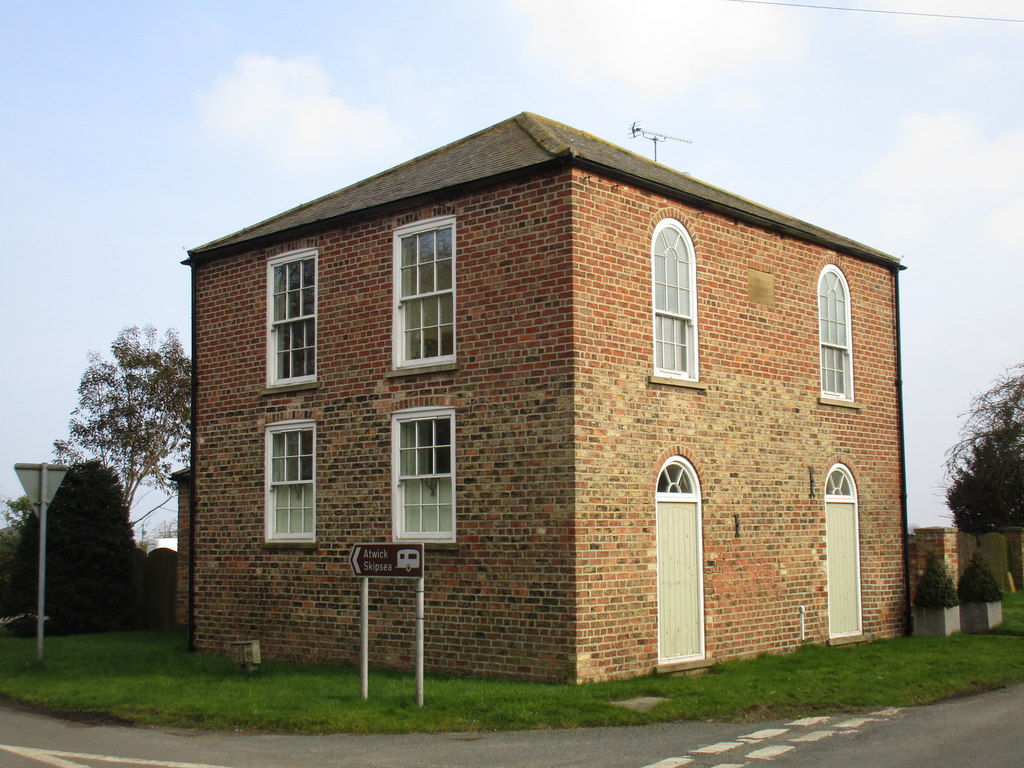
The building, in 2016

Bewholme Primitive Methodist Chapel is a historic building in Bewholme, a village in the East Riding of Yorkshire, in England.

The Wesleyan Methodist Church built at chapel in Bewholme in 1837. In 1839, the Primitive Methodist Church built a chapel in the village. It was enlarged and partly rebuilt in 1859. The majority of labourers in the village attended the Primitive Methodist Chapel, and the Wesleyan Methodist Chapel was disused by 1893, and although it reopened around 1905, it closed again and was sold in 1924. In 1933, both the Primitive and Wesleyan Methodists became part of the Methodist Church of Great Britain. The chapel was grade II listed in 1987; Nikolaus Pevsner describes the building as "pleasing". The chapel closed in the late 1990s, and was later converted into a house.

The building is constructed of red and grey brick with a hipped slate roof. There are two storeys, a square plan and fronts of two bays. On the ground floor are two round-headed doorways with radial fanlights. The windows are sashes, those on the front with round-arched heads. Between the upper floor windows on the front is an inscribed and dated stone panel. Before conversion into a house, it had a tiered interior, with pews and simple panelling.

== See also ==
- Listed buildings in Bewholme
