= St Mary Magdalene and St Helena's Church, Nunkeeling =

Church in the East Riding of Yorkshire, England

Coordinates: 53.9348°N 0.2567°W

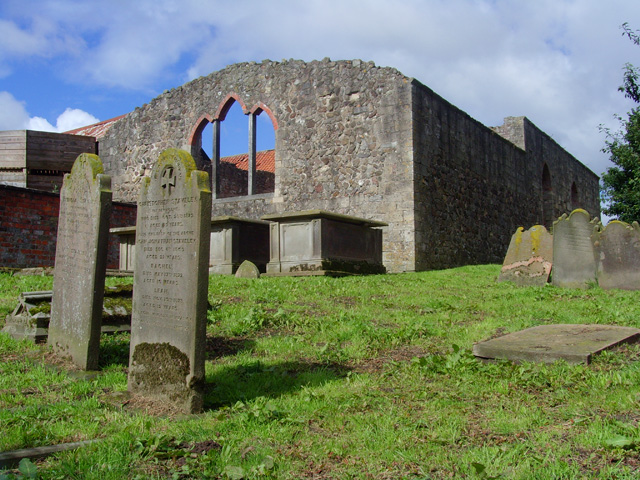
The building, in 2008

St Mary Magdalene and St Helena's Church is a ruined Anglican church in Nunkeeling, a hamlet in the East Riding of Yorkshire, in England.

The church was originally built in 1152, as part of Nunkeeling Priory, serving as the parish church of Nunkeeling. It originally had a nave and chancel, with a north aisle added in the 13th century. After the Dissolution of the Monasteries, the aisle was removed, but the church remained in use while falling into disrepair. By the late 18th century, the chancel had no roof. In 1810, the church was rebuilt, using the old materials. St John the Baptist's Church, Bewholme was built nearby in 1900, and the church in Nunkeeling closed in 1928. It again fell into disrepair, but was grade II listed in 1985, and the ruins were consolidated in 1987. The bell was moved to Bewholme, the Norman font to Hull, and the memorials to St Nicholas' Church, Hornsea.

The church is built of brick faced with stone and cobbles, and does not have a roof. It consists of a two-bay nave and a single-bay chancel. The west door has a round head, the chancel has an east window of three stepped lancets, and the nave windows are pointed with small keystones.

== See also ==
- Listed buildings in Bewholme
