= Yorke Almshouses =

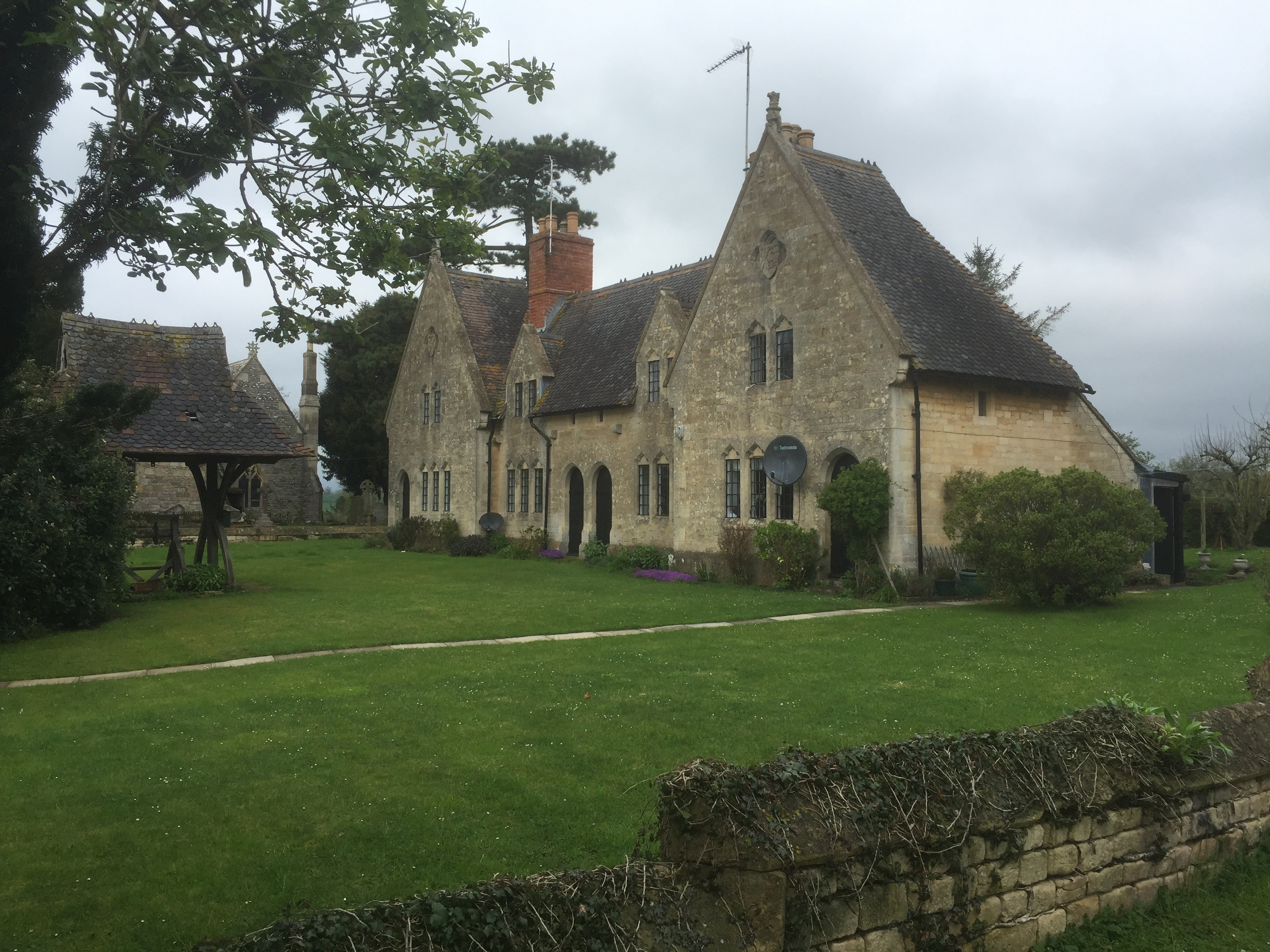

- Location within Gloucestershire
- 51.9914°N 2.2065°W
- Type: Almshouse
- Location: Forthampton, Gloucestershire

History
- Built: 1865

Site notes
- Architect: William Burges
- Architectural style: Gothic Revival
- Governing body: Privately owned

Listed Building – Grade II
- Official name: Nos 14–17 (consecutive) Church Row
- Designated: 12 August 1985
- Reference no.: 1340279

The Yorke Almshouses, Nos. 14–17 Church Row, Forthampton, Gloucestershire, England, are a range of four almshouses designed by the architect William Burges in 1865. The block is a Grade II listed building and the almshouses remain private residences.

== History and description ==
Burges designed the almshouses in 1865. His patron was Joseph Yorke, of the family of local landowners. The family fortune had been established by Philip Yorke, 1st Earl of Hardwicke, a successful lawyer and politician. His son James Yorke (1730–1808) acquired the Forthampton Court estate in 1762, through his marriage to an heiress, Mary Maddox. James Yorke became successively Bishop of St David's, Bishop of Gloucester and Bishop of Ely. His grandson Joseph commissioned Burges to undertake a restoration of the Forthampton parish church, St Mary the Virgin, between 1863 and 1866, and the almshouses, which stand next to the church, were completed during this period. The restoration and construction work at Forthampton was conceived as a memorial to Joseph's daughter, Augusta Emmeline, who died in 1863, weeks after giving birth to an heir.

Alan Brooks, in the revised 2002 Gloucestershire volume of Pevsner's Buildings of England series, describes the Yorke almshouses as "a thin row, with gables bearing the Yorke arms and their crest as finials". They are built of limestone, to a symmetrical design, with a fish scale tiled roof. The complete block is designated a Grade II listed building.
