= Elizabeth Almshouses, Worthing =

Elizabeth Almshouses
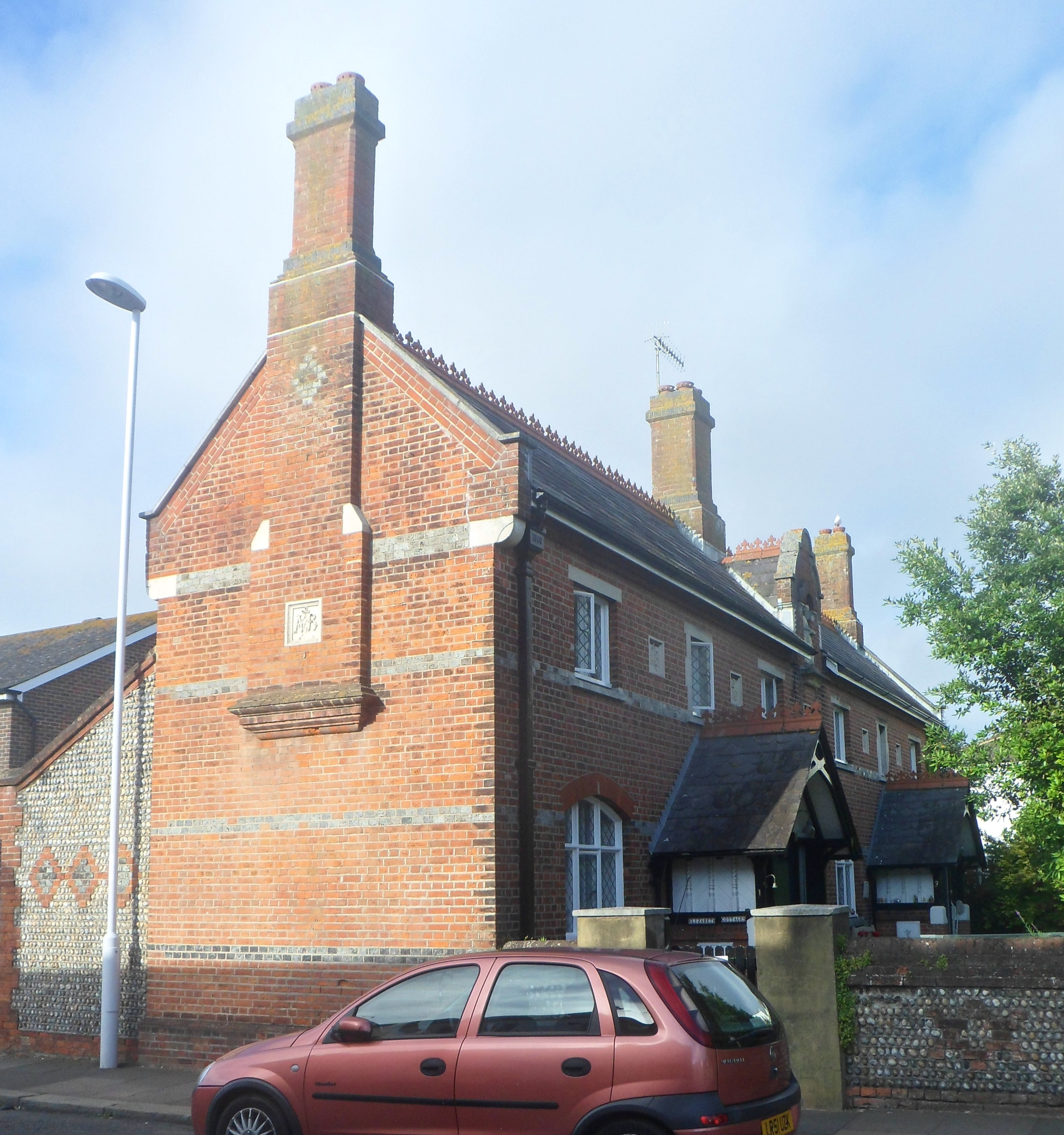
- "(a) symmetrical design of some richness"

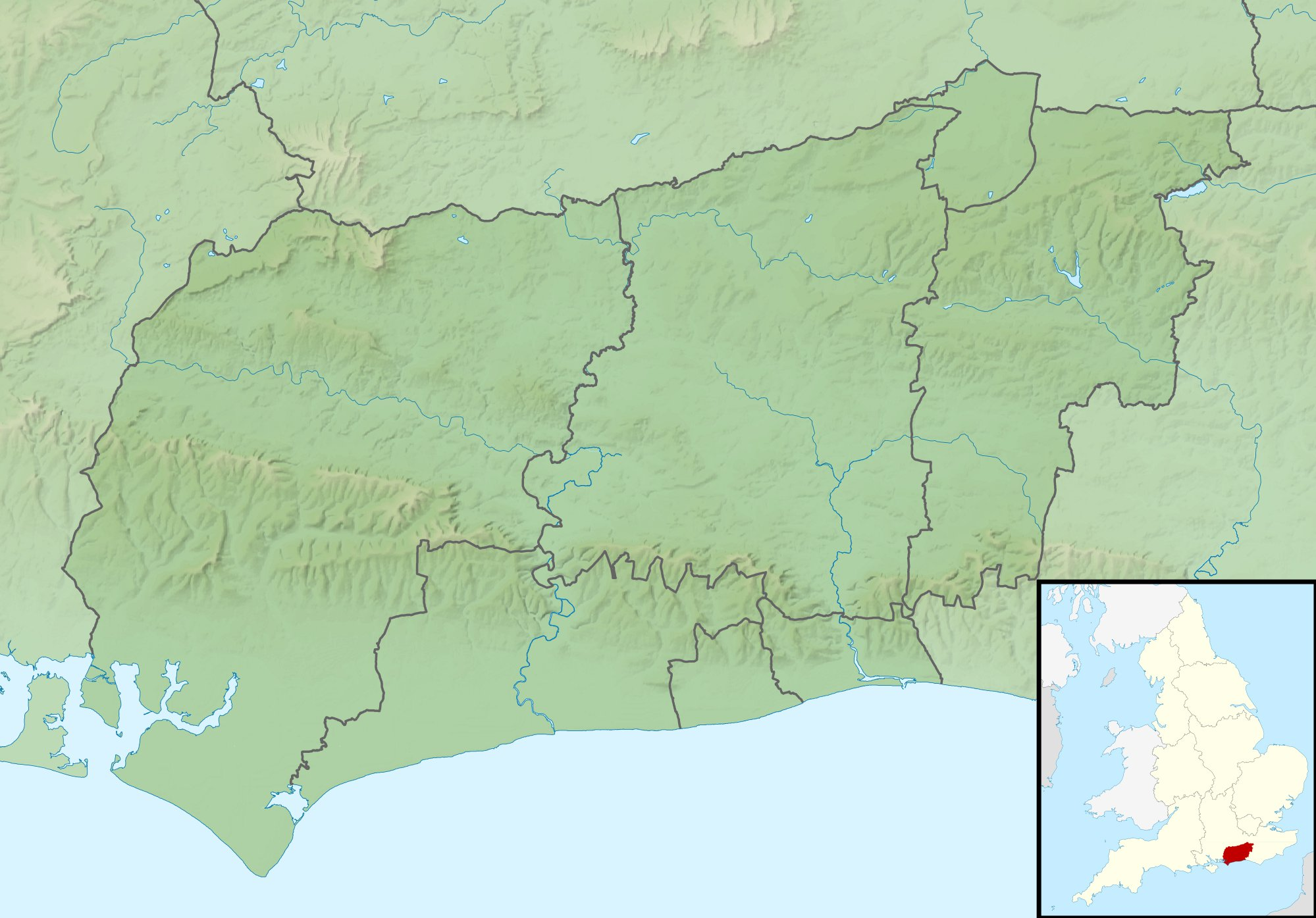
- Location within West Sussex
- 50.8143°N 0.3774°W
- Type: Almshouses
- Location: Worthing, West Sussex

History
- Built: 1860

Site notes
- Architect: William Burges
- Architectural style: Gothic Revival
- Governing body: Privately owned

Listed Building – Grade II
- Official name: Elizabeth Almshouses
- Designated: 21 May 1976
- Reference no.: 1039920

The Elizabeth Almshouses are a collection of four almshouses on Elizabeth Road, Worthing built in 1860 by the architect William Burges. The almshouses were paid for by William's father, Alfred Burges, in memory of Alfred's wife. The building is listed Grade II.

== History and architecture ==
Alfred Burges was a civil engineer who made a considerable fortune through his work with James Walker for their engineering company Messrs. Walker and Burges. In 1860, he commissioned his son, William, to draw up plans for the building of four almshouses in memory of Alfred's wife. The building is two-storeys high and is constructed of red brick. Under a centrally-situated gablet is a statuette of St Elizabeth of Hungary. The almshouses are a Grade II listed building, described as a "symmetrical design of some richness". Burges intended the almshouses to be occupied by "poor single women, not less than 50 years old, of good reputation". The National Almshouses Association later became responsible for them, and in 1986 they asked for renovations to be carried out. No funds were available, though, and the residents were moved out. In 1992 Worthing Borough Council took over the almshouses and refurbished them. They have since been held in trust by the borough's Housing Committee.

The 1970 edition of Sussex, part of The Buildings of England series, and authored by Ian Nairn and Nikolaus Pevsner, makes no mention of the almshouses, although Nairn, who wrote the West Sussex section, does describe Worthing, recording it as "an exasperating town (that) began by imitating Brighton and ended by imitating Bournemouth". The revised (2019) guide, Sussex:West, does record the almshouses, although it (incorrectly?) describes William as the "brother of the founder, Alfred Burges of Blackheath (London)".
