= St John the Baptist's Church, Bewholme =

Church in the East Riding of Yorkshire, England

Coordinates: 53.9339°N 0.2261°W

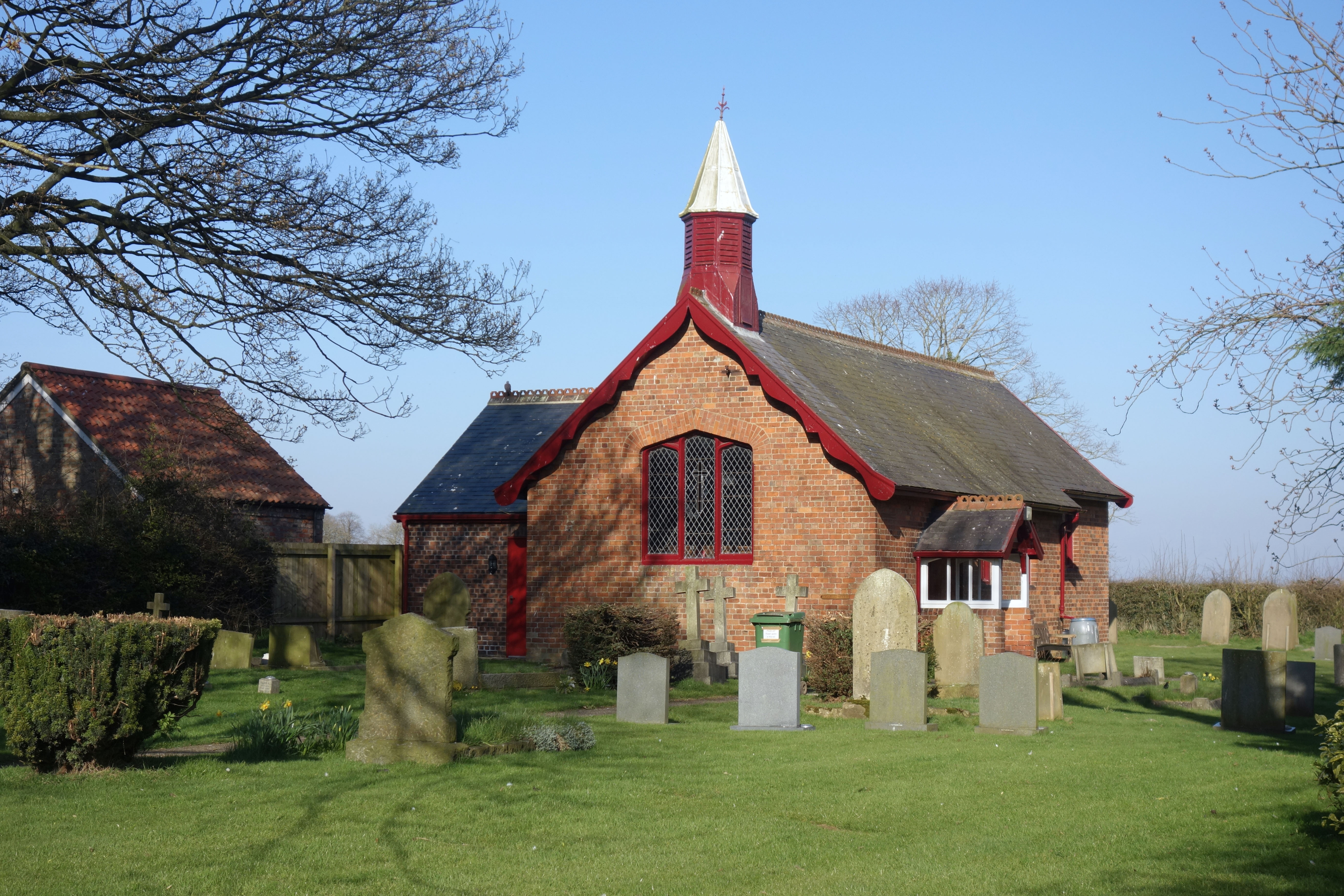
The church, in 2020

St John the Baptist's Church is a church in Bewholme, a village in the East Riding of Yorkshire, in England.

The building was constructed in 1900, to a design by W. S. Walker. It was originally in the parish of St Mary Magdalene and St Helena's Church, Nunkeeling, but that church was closed in 1928. Nikolaus Pevsner describes the church as "simple".

The church is built of red brick and consists of a chancel, nave, south porch, and west bell turret. It has prominent bargeboards. Inside, the fittings are made of pitch pine and include benches and chancel and vestry screens. The church has one bell, moved from Nunkeeling.
