= Dunnington, East Riding of Yorkshire =

Village in the East Riding of Yorkshire, England

Coordinates: 53.952473°N 0.244634°W

Dunnington
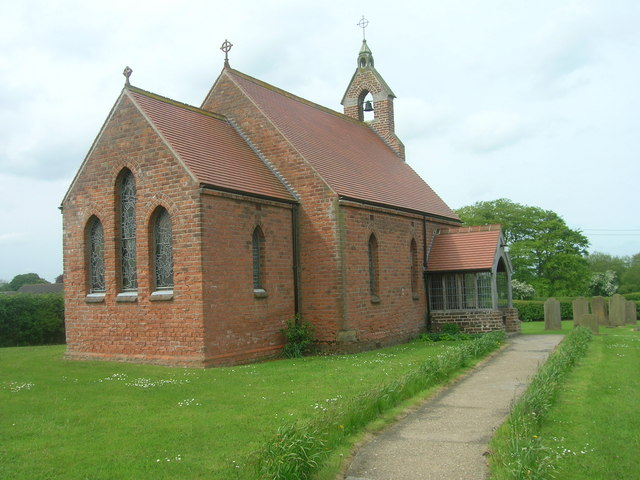
- St Nicholas church, Dunnington

- Location within the East Riding of Yorkshire
- OS grid reference: TA152521
  - London: 170 mi (270 km) S
- Civil parish: Bewholme
- Unitary authority: East Riding of Yorkshire
- Ceremonial county: East Riding of Yorkshire
- Region: Yorkshire and the Humber
- Country: England
- Sovereign state: United Kingdom
- Post town: DRIFFIELD
- Postcode district: YO25
- Dialling code: 01262
- Police: Humberside
- Fire: Humberside
- Ambulance: Yorkshire
- UK Parliament: Bridlington and The Wolds

Dunnington is a village in the civil parish of Bewholme, in the East Riding of Yorkshire, England. It is situated approximately 4 miles (6.4 km) north-west of the town of Hornsea and 2 miles (3.2 km) south-east of the village of Beeford.

Dunnington was formerly a township in the parish of Beeford, in 1866 Dunnington became a civil parish, on 1 April 1935 the parish was abolished to form Bewholme. In 1931 the parish had a population of 55.

The name Dunnington derives from an Old English personal name, either Dudda or Dodda, and ingtūn meaning 'settlement connected with'.
