= Nunkeeling Priory =

Priory in the East Riding of Yorkshire, England

Coordinates: 53.931268°N 0.261899°W

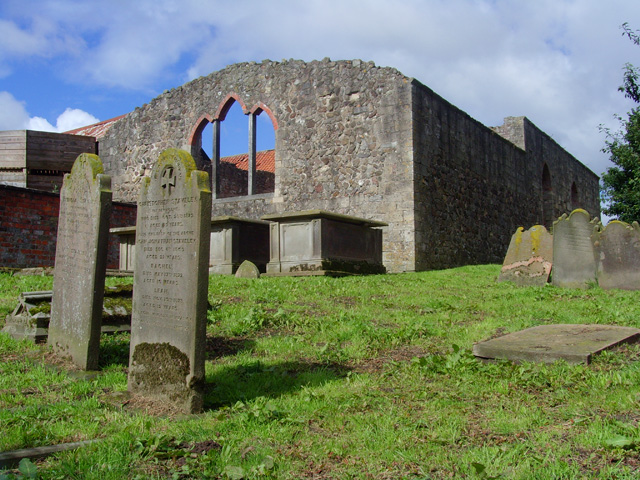
Ruins of the rebuilt church

Nunkeeling Priory was a priory of Benedictine nuns in the East Riding of Yorkshire, England founded by Agnes de Arches or de Catfoss in 1152 . It was dedicated to St. Mary Magdalene and to St. Helen. The priory became well known and nearby Keeling was renamed Nunkeeling. The priory suffered from great poverty towards the end of the 13th century. In the early 14th century several cases of disobedience among the nuns became known, leading to disciplinary measures ordered by the archbishop of York (possibly William Melton).

Nunkeeling priory was not immediately dissolved in 1536, even being refounded in 1537. However, its remaining assets were finally surrendered in 1540. Once the land was confiscated and became crown property under Henry VIII, it was eventually sold as a manor. The last prioress was Christine Burgh, who moved to Catterick where she died in 1566.

The church of the priory was rebuilt in 1810 using materials of the original structure, but has fallen into ruins since.
