= Nunkeeling =

Hamlet in the East Riding of Yorkshire, England

Coordinates: 53.930101°N 0.260805°W

- Location within the East Riding of Yorkshire
- OS grid reference: TA142496
  - London: 165 mi (266 km) S
- Civil parish: Bewholme
- Unitary authority: East Riding of Yorkshire
- Ceremonial county: East Riding of Yorkshire
- Region: Yorkshire and the Humber
- Country: England
- Sovereign state: United Kingdom
- Post town: DRIFFIELD
- Postcode district: YO25
- Dialling code: 01964
- Police: Humberside
- Fire: Humberside
- Ambulance: Yorkshire
- UK Parliament: Bridlington and The Wolds

Nunkeeling is a hamlet in the East Riding of Yorkshire, England. It is situated approximately 4 miles (6.4 km) north-west of the town of Hornsea and 3 miles (5 km) south of Beeford.

Nunkeeling forms part of the civil parish of Bewholme.

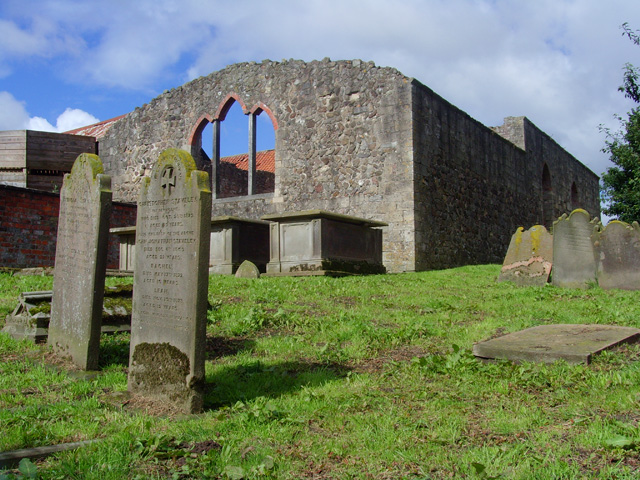
St Mary Magdalene and St Helena Church

St Mary Magdalene and St Helena's Church was built c. 12th century. In 1810 it was rebuilt and is now in ruins. In 1972 Pevsner noted that the church was "full of trees". Effigies from the church were removed to Hornsea. In November 1985 the remains were designated as Grade II and is now recorded in the National Heritage List for England, maintained by Historic England.

== History ==
Nunkeeling is noted in the Domesday Book in 1086 as Keeling (spelled Chilinghr) in Holderness Wapentake. The listed lord of the manor, Drogo de la Beuvrière, fled England in 1087 following the death of his wife. So William the Conqueror granted the manor to his sister Adelaide as part of the Lordship of Holderness, and her husband Odo became Earl of Holderness by right of his wife.

The -ing suffix was used in Old English to form derivatives of masculine nouns and indicates 'belonging to', so the land at some time in its Anglo-Saxon past likely belonged to descendants of a man who spoke Old Norse, whose name was Latinised as Chil and in Anglicised as Keel.

The name of the hamlet changed from Keeling to Nunkeeling due to the fame of Nunkeeling Priory, built by Agnes de Arches during the reign of King Stephen for Benedictine nuns. Eventually the priory owned most of the surrounding land but declined into poverty.

In 1823 Nunkeeling was a civil parish in the Wapentake and Liberty of Holderness. Lord of the manor in 1823 was Harrington Hudson of Bessingby. Population at the time, which included Bewholme, was 243, with occupations including four farmers. A private asylum existed in the village.
