= Thames Street, London =

Street in the City of London

Coordinates: 51°30′35″N 0°5′15″W

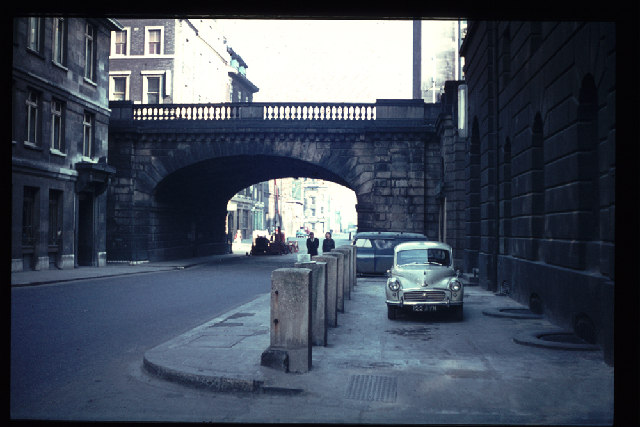
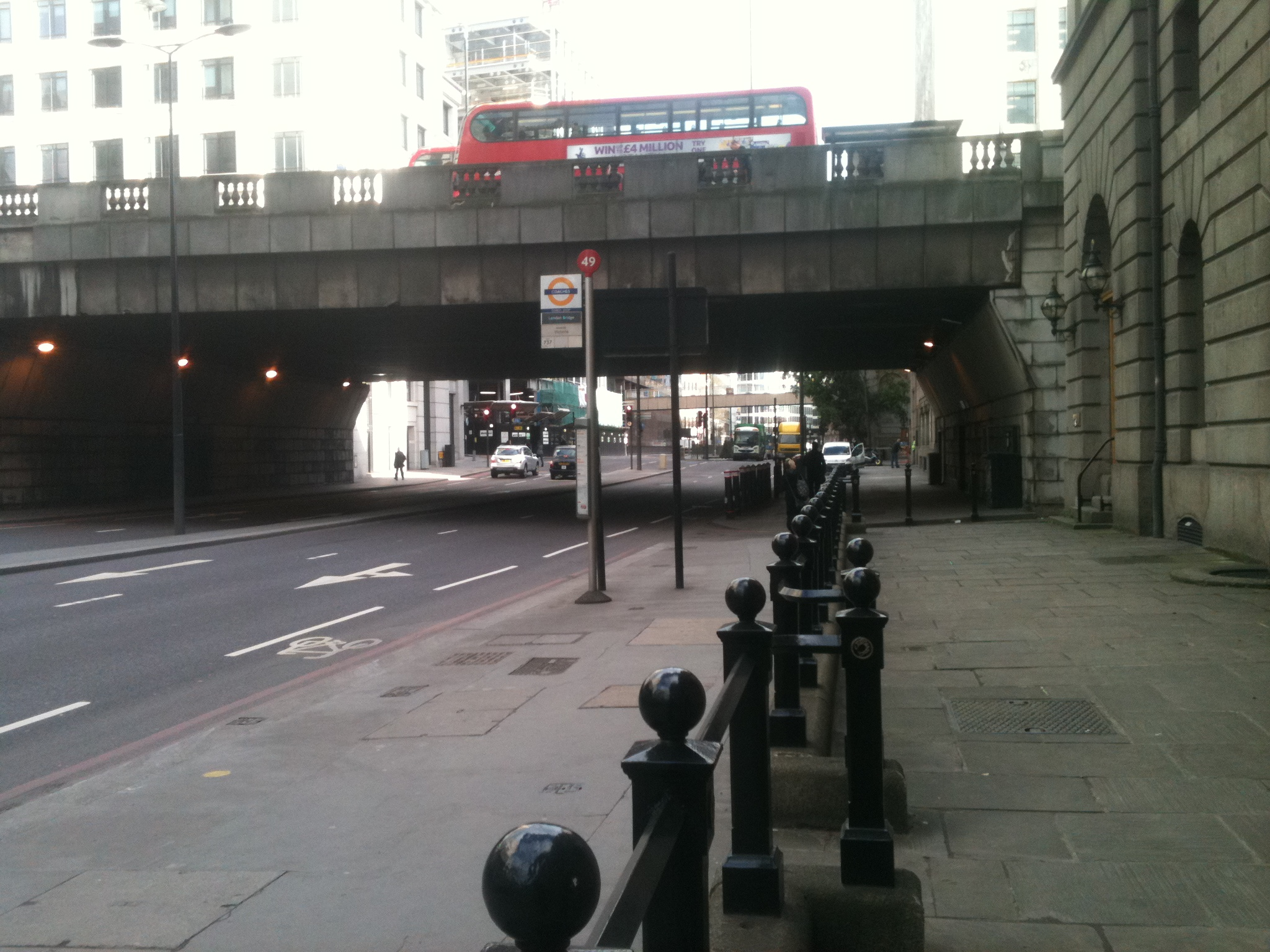
Looking east down Thames Street, at the London Bridge underpass, in c. 1965 (left) and in 2013 (right). The street has clearly become a major thoroughfare in today's City of London.

Thames Street, divided into Lower and Upper Thames Street, is a road in the City of London, the historic and financial centre of London. It forms part of the busy A3211 route (prior to being rebuilt as a major thoroughfare in the late 1960s, it was the B132) from Tower Hill to Westminster. The London Bridge underpass marks the divide between Upper and Lower Thames Street, with Lower to the east and Upper to the west.

== History ==
Thames Street is mentioned in the diary of Samuel Pepys. The first mention of the road, however, is from 1013 when the custom house was founded on the street. During the reign of King Henry VIII, the street contained the London residences of many courtiers, including that of William Compton, where Henry VIII allegedly met his mistresses.

== Twentieth century ==
In the culture of the 20th century, the street is probably best remembered for its place in T. S. Eliot's The Waste Land:

O city city, I can sometimes hear
Beside a public bar in Lower Thames Street,
The pleasant whining of a mandoline
And a clatter and a chatter from within
Where fishmen lounge at noon: where the walls
Of Magnus Martyr hold
Inexplicable splendour of Ionian white and gold.

At 101 Lower Thames Street, remains of a Roman bath were excavated. They are preserved in the cellar of the modern building on the site.

Little evidence of the street's history remains, in a large part due to the Blitz and post-War redevelopment, and it now contains many office buildings, including the headquarters of the Daily Express newspaper. The London Fire Brigade's fire investigation unit is based at Dowgate fire station on Upper Thames Street at the corner of Allhallows Lane; the station is the only one within the City of London. The most notable change is at the western end of the thoroughfare, which dramatically altered its course as part of major works of the 1960s, involving the reclaiming of foreshore of the Thames at Puddle Dock.

== Twenty-first century ==
Lower Thames Street formed part of the marathon course of the 2012 Olympic and Paralympic Games. The women's Olympic marathon took place on 5 August and the men's on 12 August. The Paralympic marathons were held on 9 September.

== See also ==
- Coal Exchange
- Skilbeck's Warehouse
