= Skilbeck's Warehouse =

Former building in the City of London

Coordinates: 51.5106°N 0.0923°W

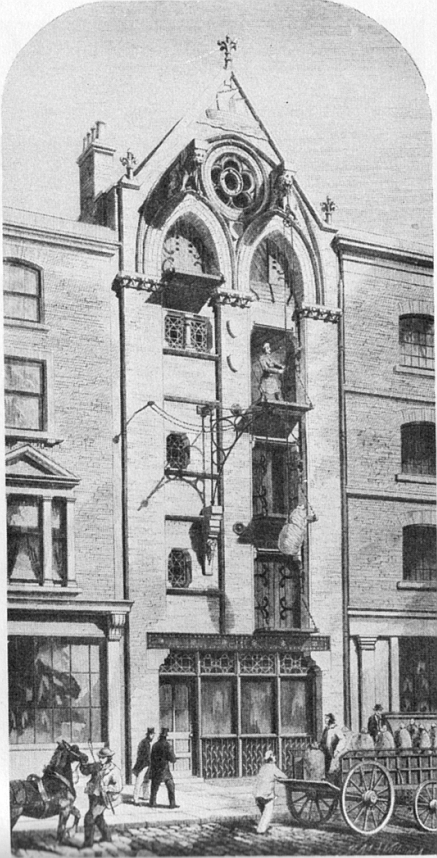
- Skilbeck's Warehouse

General information
- Architectural style: warehouse
- Location: London, United Kingdom
- Completed: 1866
- Demolished: C.1970
- Cost: £1,413

Design and construction
- Architect: William Burges

Skillbeck's Warehouse, formerly 46 Upper Thames Street, London, was a drysalter's warehouse constructed in 1866 by William Burges. Burges was commissioned by the Skilbeck Brothers to re-model an existing warehouse; the result was "hugely influential" representing "probably the most successful attempt ever made to unite the requirements of art and mercantile convenience."

The Skilbeck Brothers company had been drysalters in the City of London since the mid-seventeenth century. Burges's re-modelling used "twin pointed bays under a single Gothic relieving arch and gable". The use of exposed cast iron was revolutionary with "..good use of ironwork in the window frames (and) the iron girder which stretch(ed)across the front of the building (was) painted, the bolt heads being gilt". The use of modern materials and technologies was combined with Gothic iconography, "the great crane supported by a corbel carved into a bust of a fair Oriental maid, symbolising the clime from which so much of the drysalter's materials are brought, and over a circular window in the gable (a) ship bringing in its precious freight." The total cost of the work was £1,413.

The Victorian critic Charles Locke Eastlake described the warehouse in his A History of the Gothic Revival as; "one of the very few instances of the successful adaptation of Gothic for commercial purposes." The warehouse was demolished after 1970.
