= Bewholme Vicarage =

House in Bewholme, East Riding of Yorkshire, England

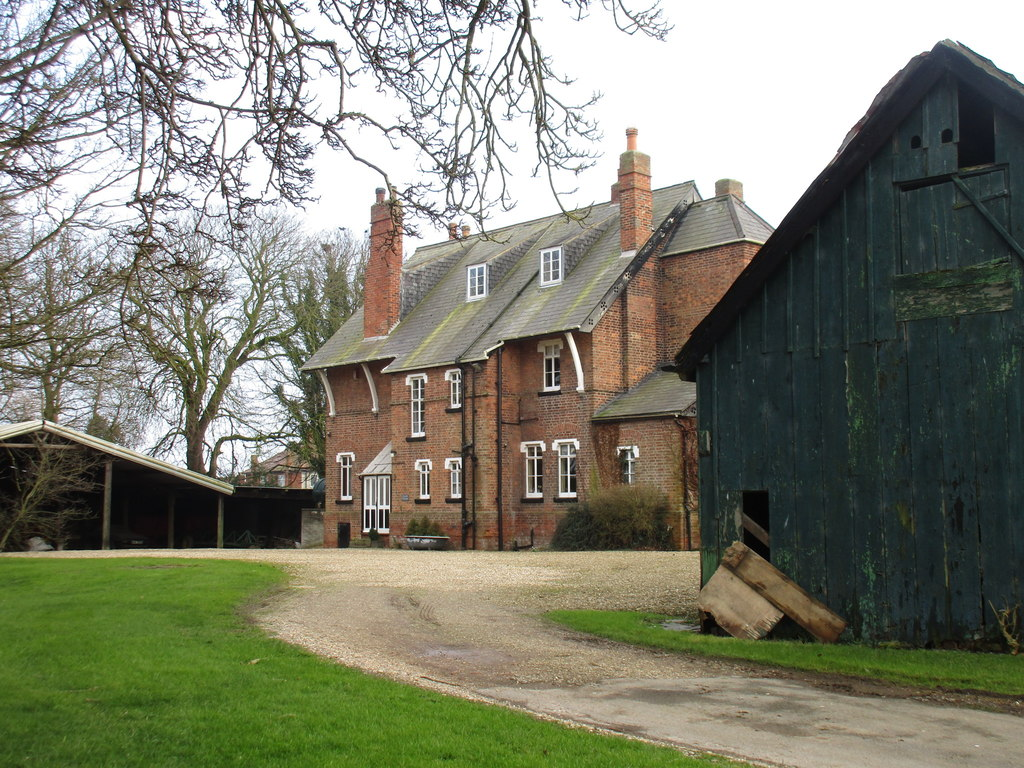

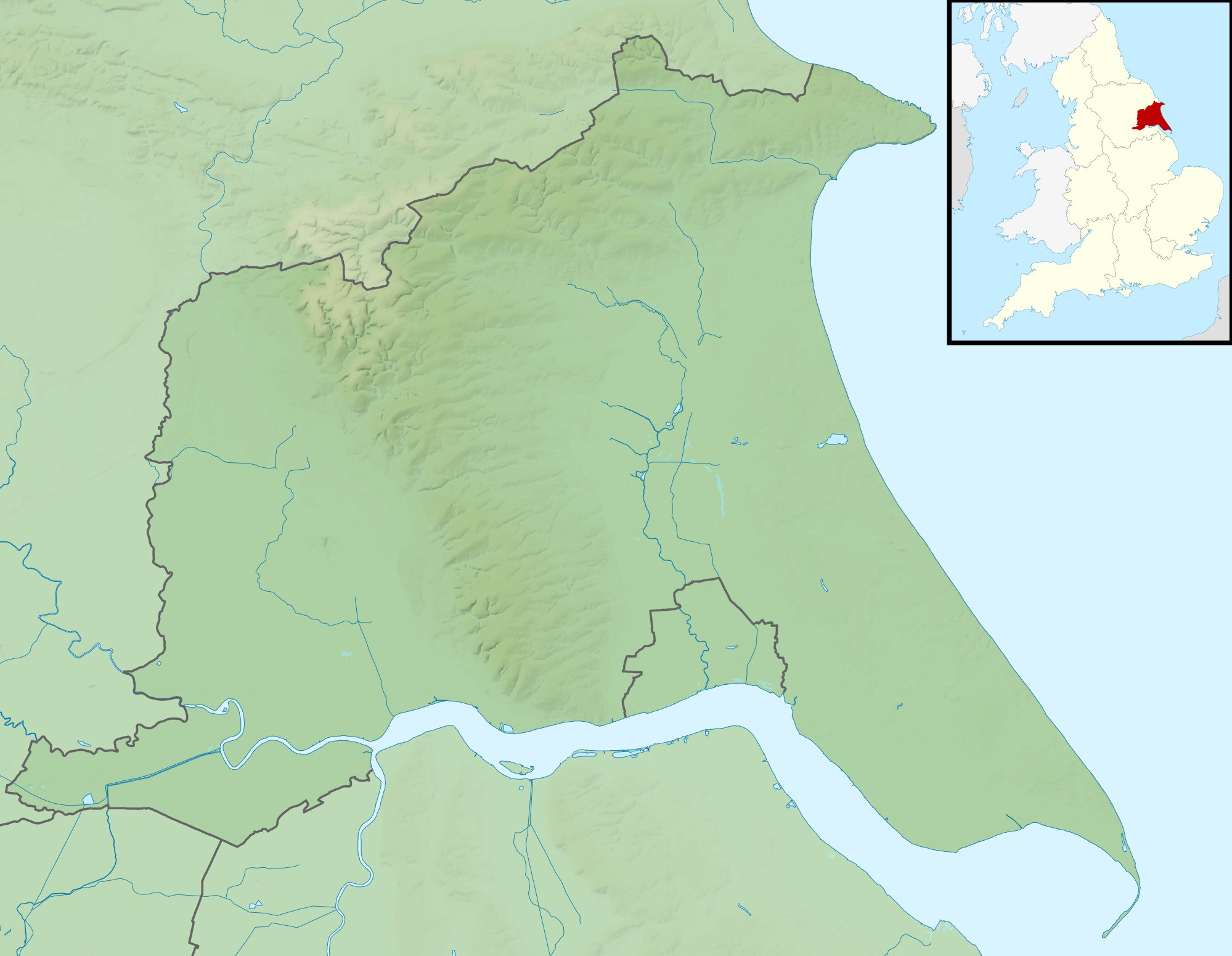
- Location within East Riding of Yorkshire
- 53.9332°N 0.226°W
- Type: House
- Location: Bewholme, East Riding of Yorkshire

History
- Built: 1859

Site notes
- Architect: William Burges
- Architectural style: Gothic Revival
- Governing body: Privately owned

Listed Building – Grade II
- Official name: The Old Vicarage, Bewholme
- Designated: 26 November 1985
- Reference no.: 1249413

Bewholme Vicarage, in the village of Bewholme, East Riding of Yorkshire, England, is a former vicarage designed by the architect William Burges in 1859. It is a Grade II listed building and is now a private residence.

== History and description ==
Burges designed the vicarage in 1859. His patron appears to be unrecorded. Pevsner notes the vicarage is "a somewhat surprising house to find in a small Holderness village". In the following year, Burges also drew up designs for the parish church but these were not executed. The vicarage is of red brick with a seven-bay frontage. Anthony Jennings describes the building as in Burges's "eccentric Northern French fairytale style". Its interior retains "many original features, including the staircase and a number of fireplaces". The building is Grade II listed.

== See also ==
- Listed buildings in Bewholme
