= Alfred Burges =

British civil engineer (1796–1886)

Alfred Burges (1796–1886) was a British civil engineer. He was apprenticed to the civil engineer James Walker, and in turn trained several other engineers including Sir Joseph Bazalgette.

Walker and Burges were responsible for railways, bridges and many marine works, including 21 lighthouses, Surrey Commercial Docks, the Junction Dock at Hull, and the Bedford Levels. Their firm is noted in many documents as Messrs. Walker & Burgess, engineers of Limehouse, with his last name being almost always spelt in this way.

He died at Worthing on 12 March 1886, and is buried at West Norwood Cemetery. He left a fortune of £113,000.(£15,500,000 in 2023 adjusted for inflation)

His son William (1827–1881) was an influential architect.

== Sources ==
- Bullen, Michael; Crook, John; Hubbuck, Rodney; Pevsner, Nikolaus (2010). The Buildings Of England: Hampshire:Winchester and the North. Yale University Press. ISBN 978-0-300-12084-4.
- Crook, J. Mordaunt (2013). William Burges and the High Victorian Dream. London: Frances Lincoln. ISBN 978-0-7112-3349-2.
