= Bewholme =

Village and civil parish in the East Riding of Yorkshire, England

Coordinates: 53°56′00″N 0°13′37″W

- Location within the East Riding of Yorkshire
- Population: 232 (2011 census)
- OS grid reference: TA165500
  - London: 165 mi (266 km) S
- Civil parish: Bewholme
- Unitary authority: East Riding of Yorkshire
- Ceremonial county: East Riding of Yorkshire
- Region: Yorkshire and the Humber
- Country: England
- Sovereign state: United Kingdom
- Post town: DRIFFIELD
- Postcode district: YO25
- Dialling code: 01964
- Police: Humberside
- Fire: Humberside
- Ambulance: Yorkshire
- UK Parliament: Bridlington and The Wolds

Bewholme is a village and civil parish in the East Riding of Yorkshire, England. It is situated approximately 3 miles (4.8 km) north-west of the town of Hornsea.

The civil parish is formed by the villages of Bewholme and Dunnington and the hamlet of Nunkeeling. According to the 2011 UK census, Bewholme parish had a population of 232, a slight increase on the 2001 UK census figure of 230.

The name Bewholme possibly derives from the plural of the Old Norse bjúgr meaning 'river bend' or the Old English bēag meaning 'circle'.

The Anglican St John the Baptist's Church, Bewholme was built in 1900 by S. Walker of Bridlington, and football field. The former Bewholme Vicarage was designed by William Burges, who also drew up an unexecuted design for the church.

== See also ==
- Listed buildings in Bewholme
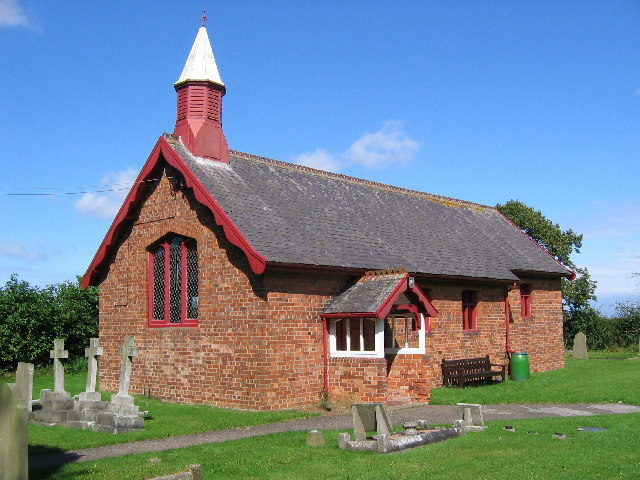
St John the Baptist church

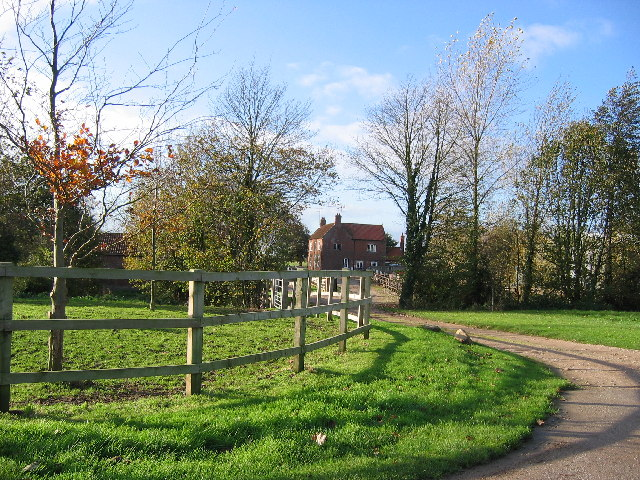
Bewholme House

== Sources ==
- Gazetteer — A–Z of Towns Villages and Hamlets. East Riding of Yorkshire Council. 2006. p. 3.
- Pevsner, Nikolaus; Neave, David (2005). Yorkshire: York and the East Riding. The Buildings of England. Yale University Press. ISBN 0-300-09593-7.
