= Forthampton =

Village in Gloucestershire, England

Coordinates: 51.99224°N 2.21078°W

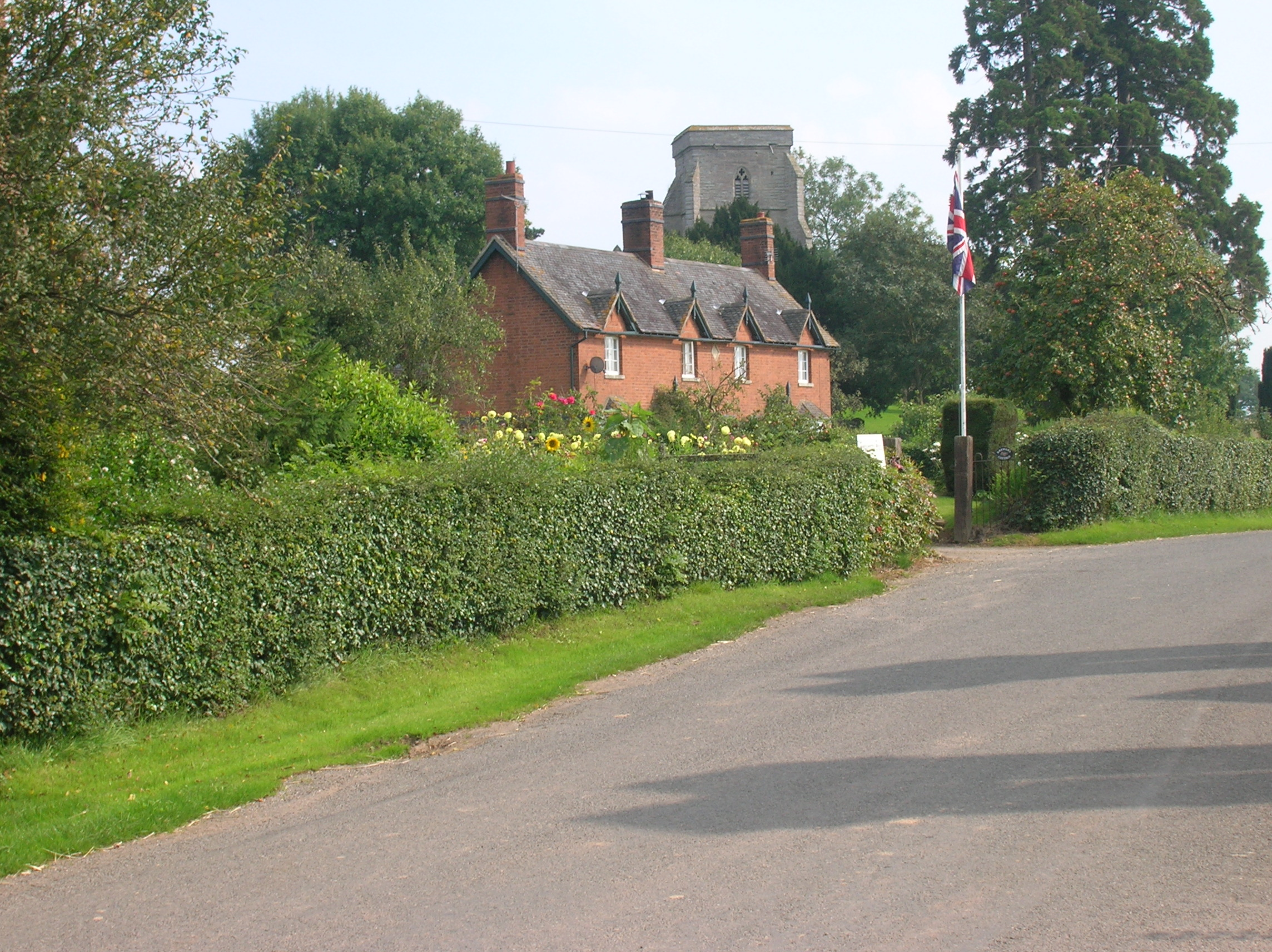
- Bishops Walk looking south

- Location within Gloucestershire
- Population: 144 (2011)
- Shire county: Gloucestershire
- Region: South West
- Country: England
- Sovereign state: United Kingdom
- Post town: Gloucester
- Postcode district: GL19
- Dialling code: 01684
- Police: Gloucestershire
- Fire: Gloucestershire
- Ambulance: South Western
- UK Parliament: Forest of Dean

Forthampton is a village in Gloucestershire, England. The village is located three miles from the market town of Tewkesbury and features "a great number of interesting buildings", fine views, several duck ponds, a church, a collection of thatched cottages and farmsteads, a village hall and a village club. Forthampton was designated a Conservation Area in 2003 due to its special architectural and historic interest, character and appearance which it was desirable to preserve and enhance. Notable features of the village include extensive historic buildings clustered around farm houses situated at the centre of the village, the many roadside ponds and grass verges around and between buildings and significant panoramic views.

The village forms a wide arc on rising, elevated ground well above the flood-plain of the Severn, from Hill End on the south to Sezincote on the east. Near the crown of the arc is the greatest concentration of houses and the church. The centre of the village is approximately 175' above sea level affording fine views over the Severn Valley.

== The Church ==
Forthampton is home to the church of St Mary the Virgin, which is a Grade II* listed building. The church is of significant historical interest and forms part of the wider Severnside Benefice, which comprises the Parishes of Chaceley, Forthampton, Deerhurst with Apperley, and Tredington with Stoke Orchard and Hardwicke. The Benefice is set in the Severn Vale, and is part of the Diocese of Gloucester.

The church consists of a nave, chancel, north aisle, west tower, and south porch. The tower is 13th-century with massive diagonal west buttresses and a stair-vice on the north-east corner. The tower has three stages and a plain parapet. The font is a memorial to Susan Plumtre who died in 1849. It is elaborately fashioned in stone and marble. There is stained glass in the church – in the west window of the north aisle – by Clayton & Bell, 1862. The chancel was restored in 1864–1866 by William Burges, who also added the reredos, the altar rails, and some stained glass.

In the churchyard, there is a whipping post and stocks, west of the church. The post has manacles and stocks for three which have survived from 1787. At the bottom of the hill is the Pound Pond, which is believed to have been the ducking pool for scolding wives.

Forthampton was originally owned by the Church, hence such street names as 'Bishop's Walk' and 'Church Lane'. The abbots of Tewkesbury used Forthampton Court as a residence from the mid twelfth to mid sixteenth centuries.

== Yorke Almshouses ==
To the east of the Church stands a row of four almshouses by William Burges of 1863–64. The almshouses are Grade II listed buildings.

== Forthampton Court ==
A medieval residence of the Bishops of Tewkesbury with many subsequent alterations including work by Anthony Keck in the eighteenth century and substantial re-modelling and additions by Philip Webb in 1889–1892.

== Gallery ==
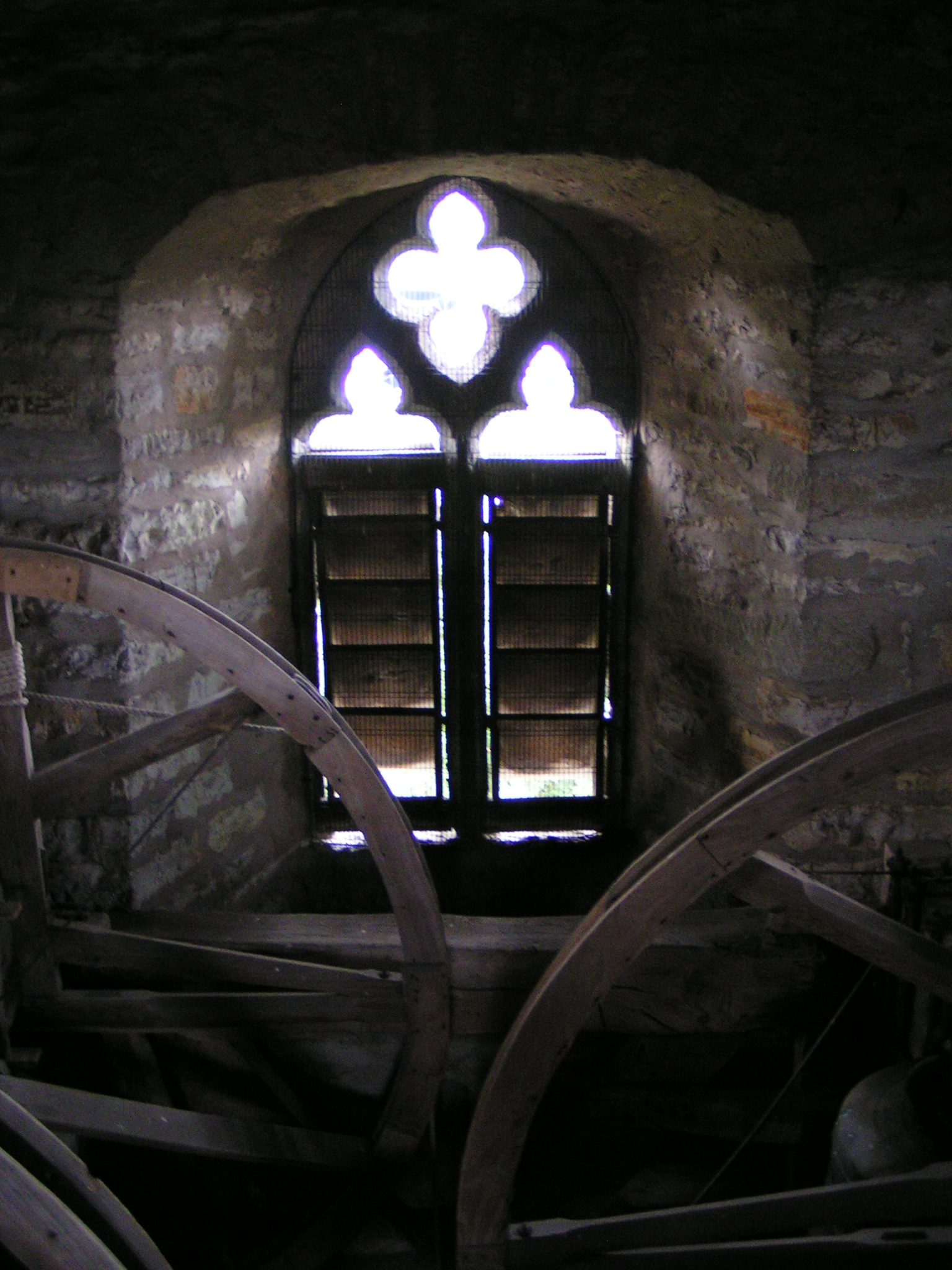
St Mary's Church Tower – interior view

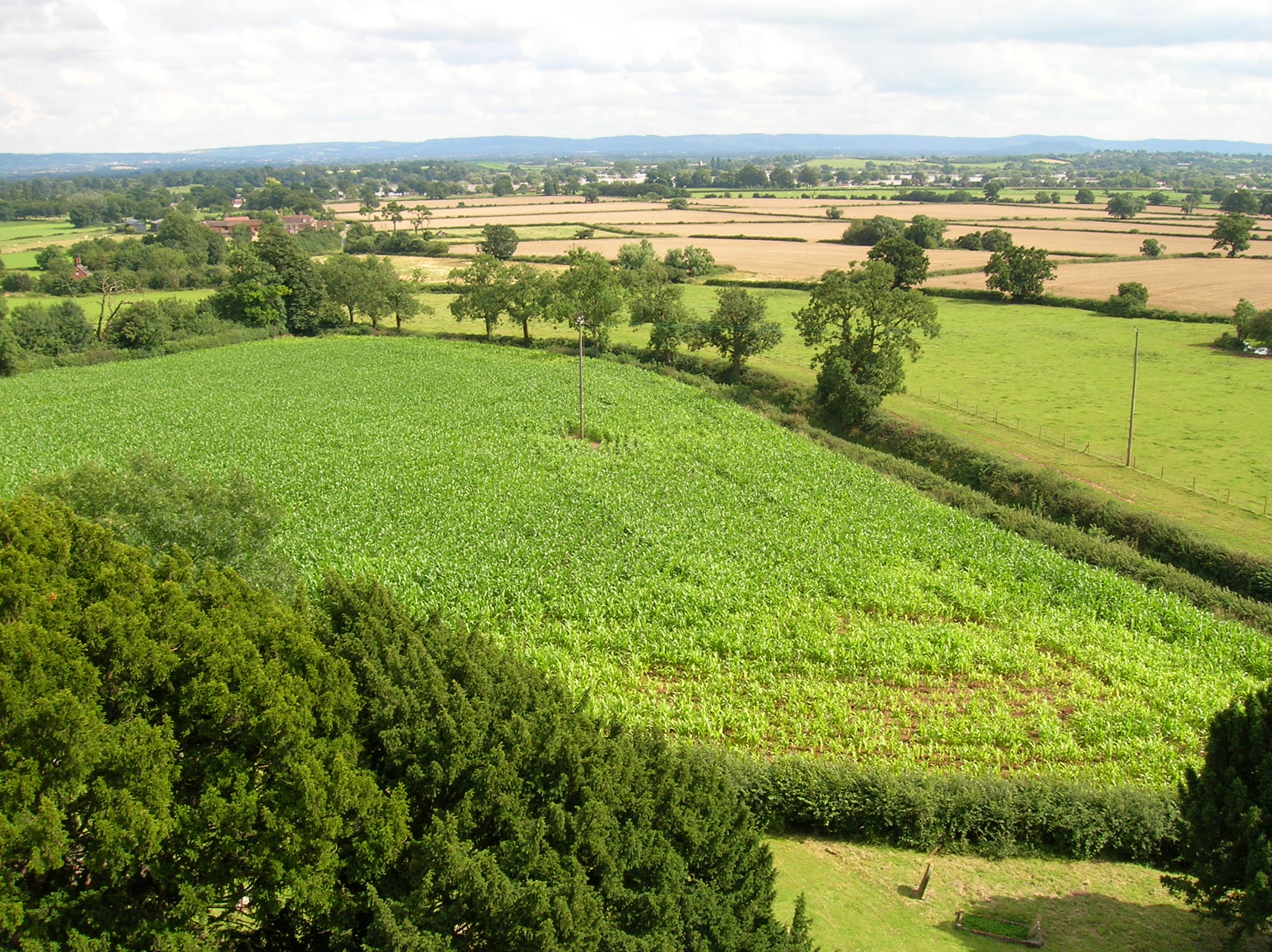
Southeasterly view

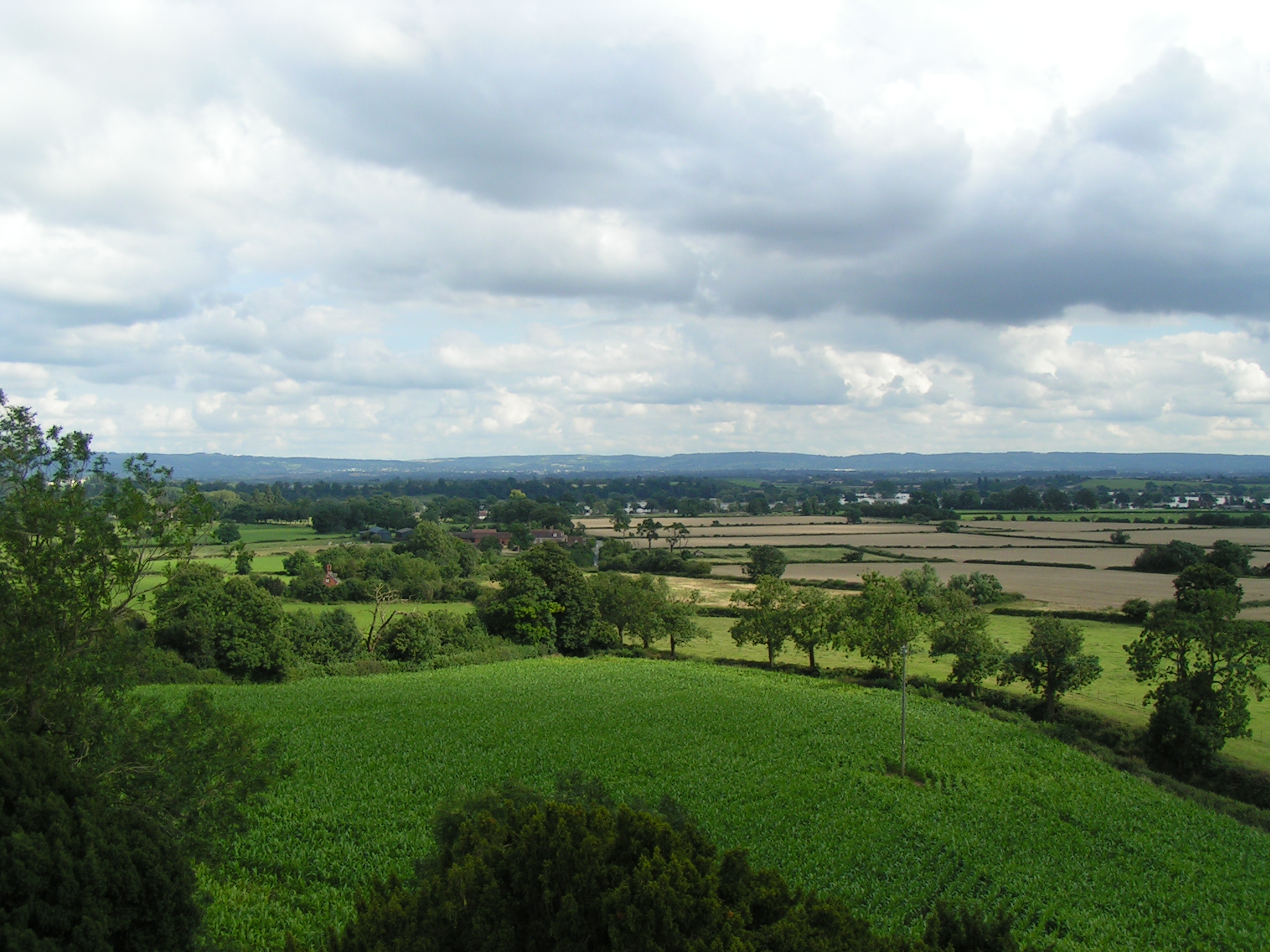
Southerly view

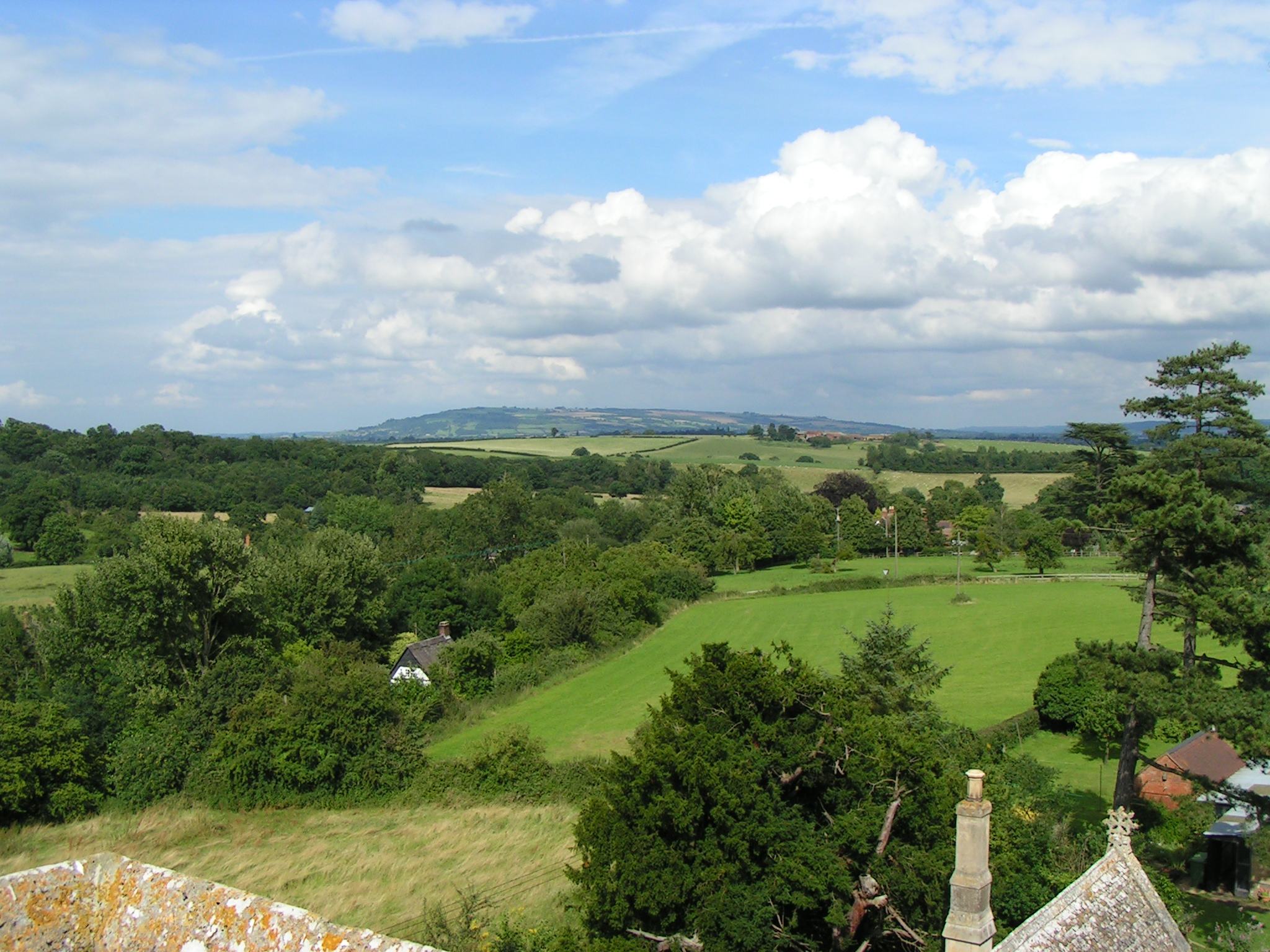
Easterly view

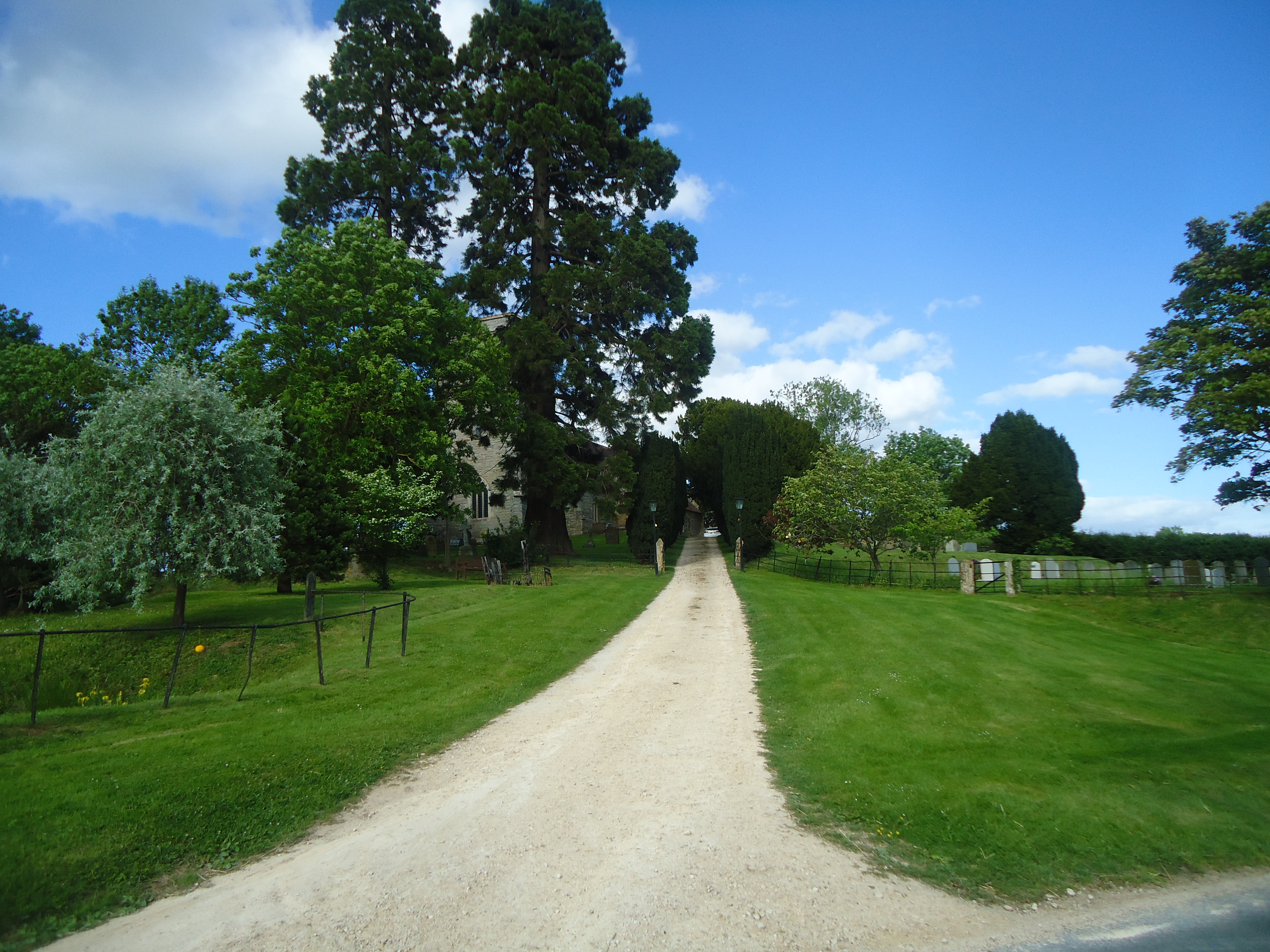
Entrance to St. Mary's

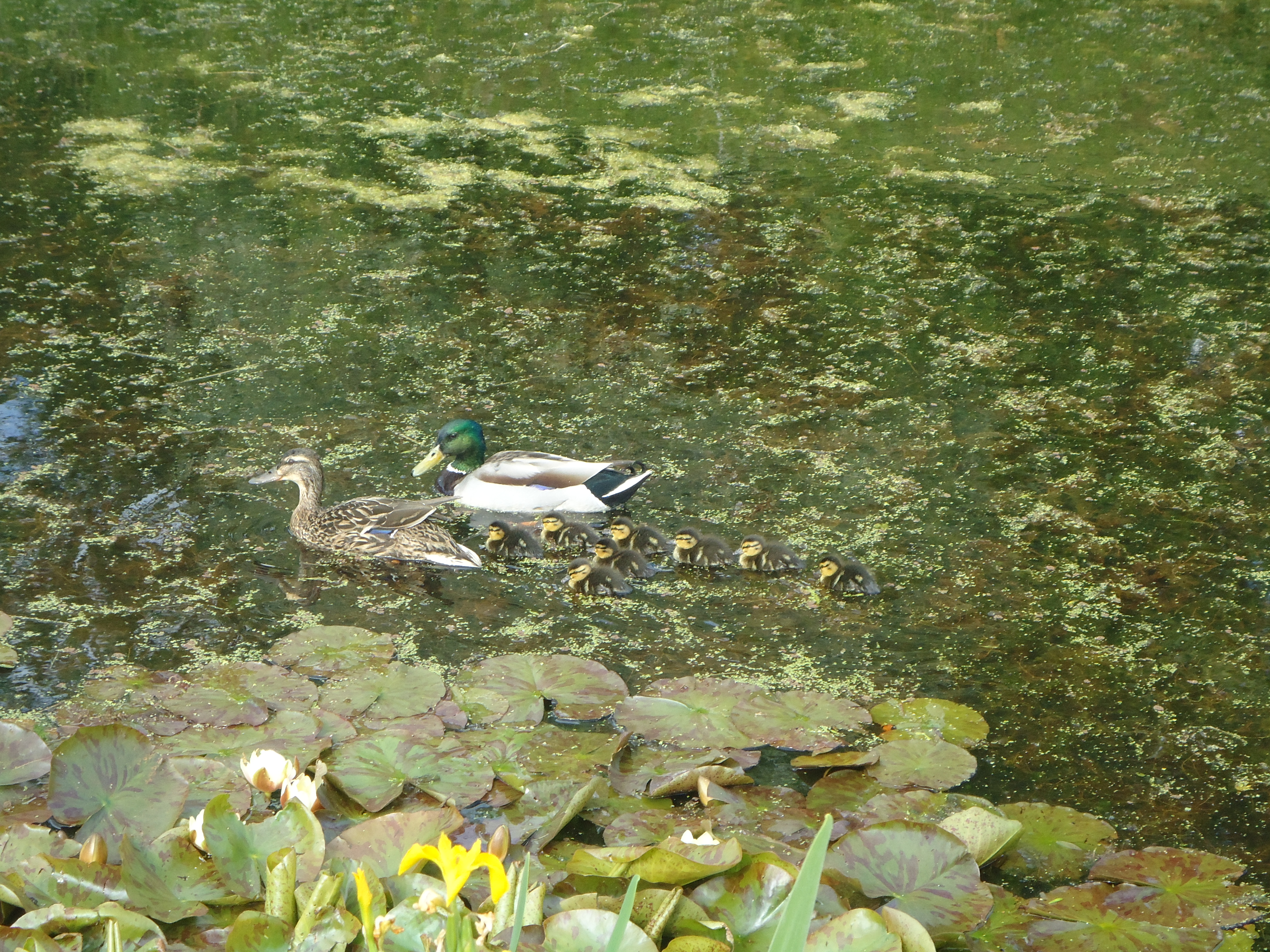
Varied wildlife in the village and environs

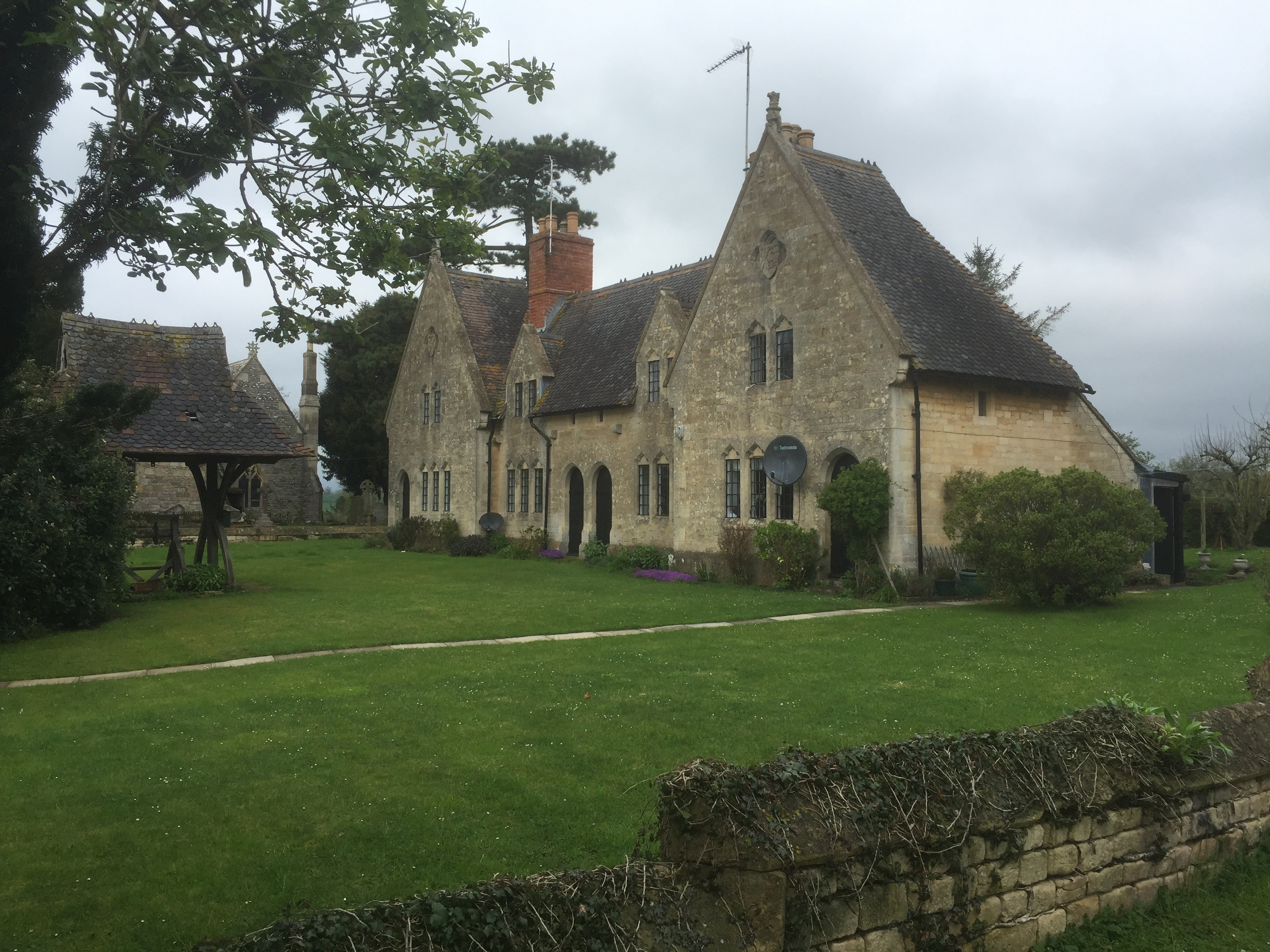
Yorke Almshouses by William Burges

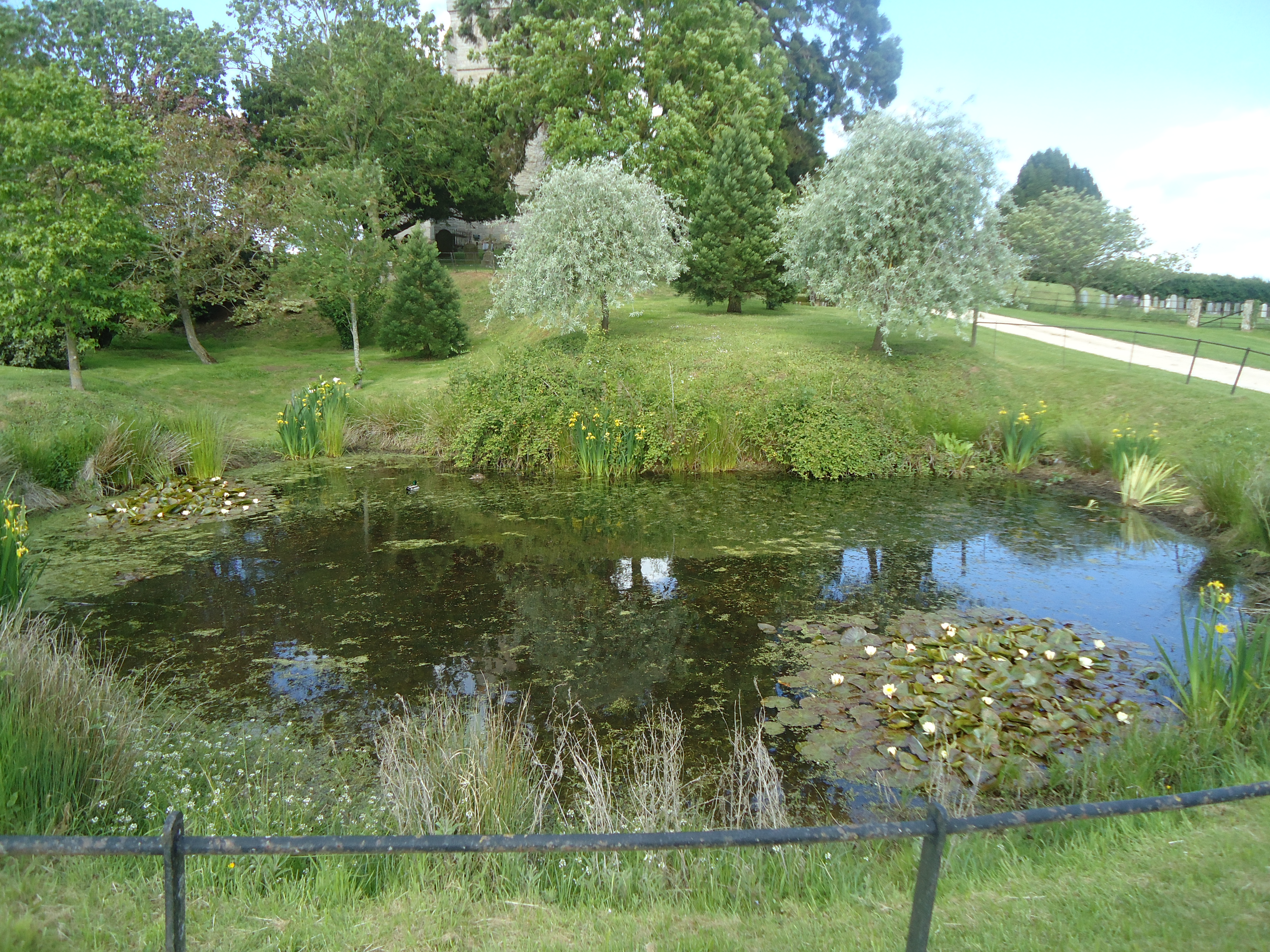
The pond outside St Mary's church, Forthampton

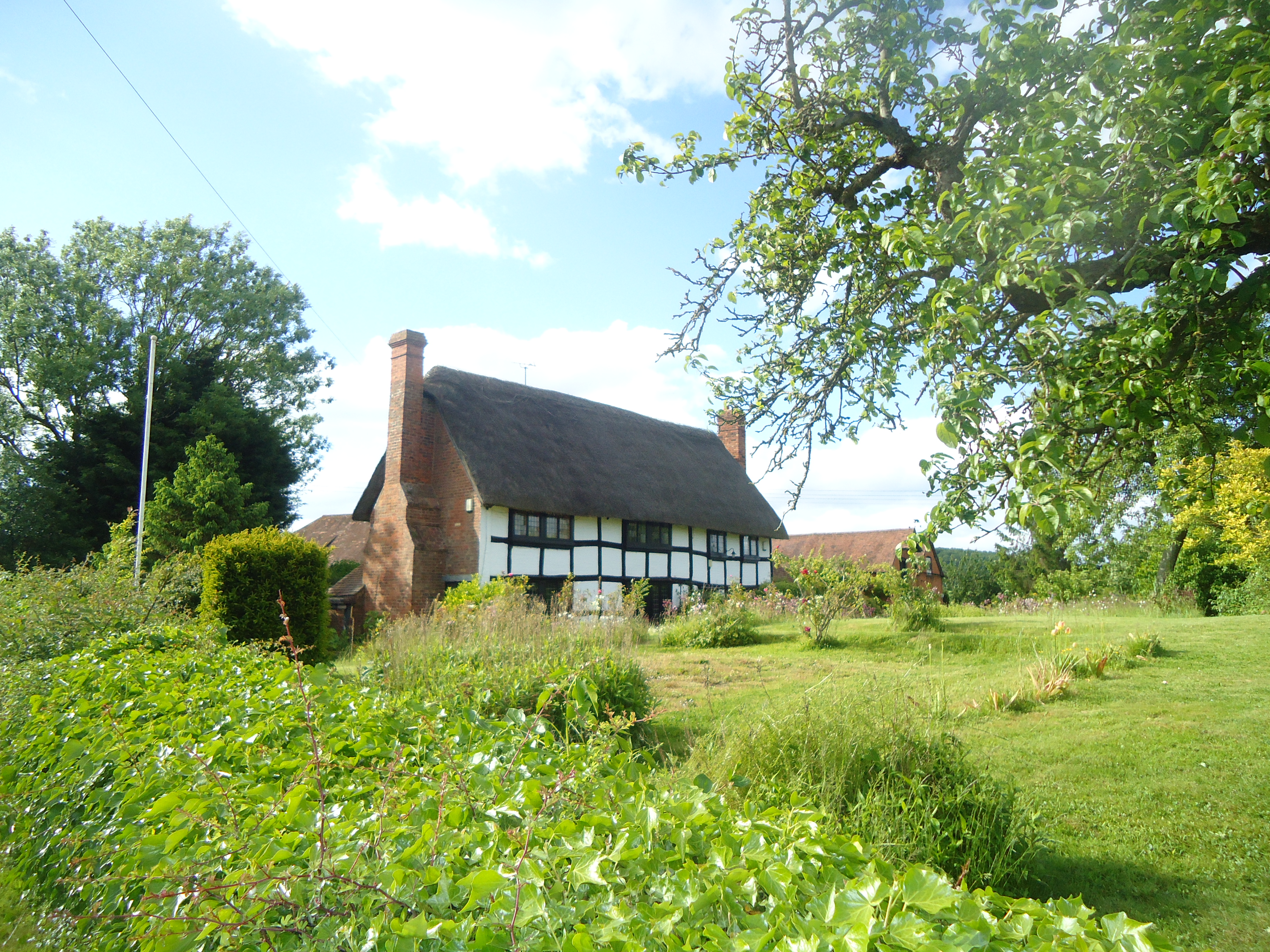
Brewers Cottage, Forthampton

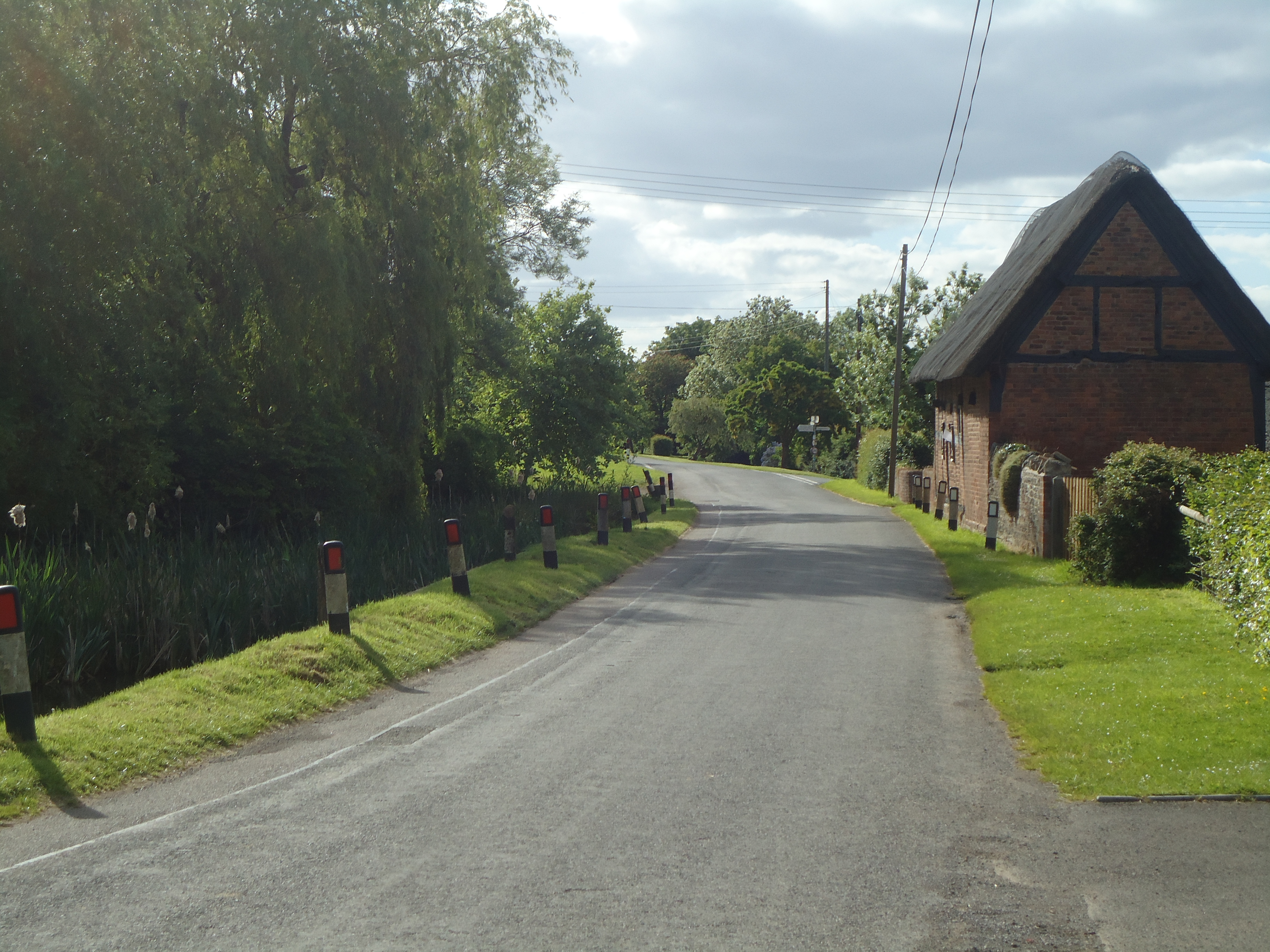
View west up Bishop's Walk, Forthampton. Main pond is on the left of the photograph.
