= Fountains Abbey and Studley Royal Water Gardens =

UNESCO World Heritage Site
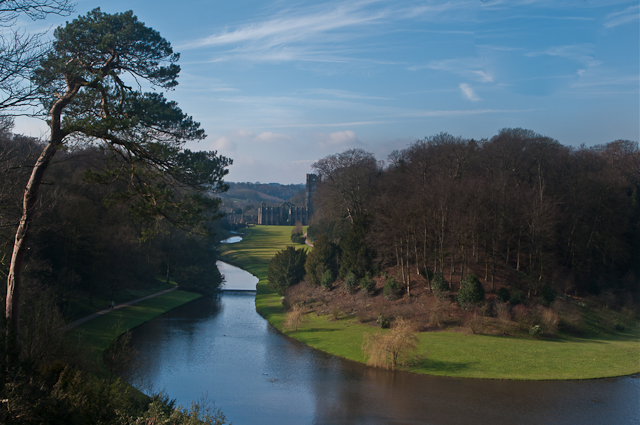
- The Surprise View in Studley Royal Park, showing Fountains Abbey

- Location within North Yorkshire
- Location: near Ripon, North Yorkshire, England, United Kingdom
- Criteria: Cultural: (i), (iv)
- Reference: 372bis
- Inscription: 1986 (10th Session)
- Extensions: 2012
- Area: 308.8 ha (1.192 sq mi)
- Buffer zone: 1,622 ha (6.26 sq mi)
- Coordinates: 54°6′58″N 1°34′23″W

Fountains Abbey and Studley Royal Water Gardens is a World Heritage Site in North Yorkshire. It was purchased by the National Trust in 1983. The 800 acres (323 hectares) site comprises:

- Studley Royal Park
- Fountains Abbey
- Fountains Hall
