= Choristers' House =

Cottage in North Yorkshire, England

Coordinates: 54°07′10″N 1°34′43″W

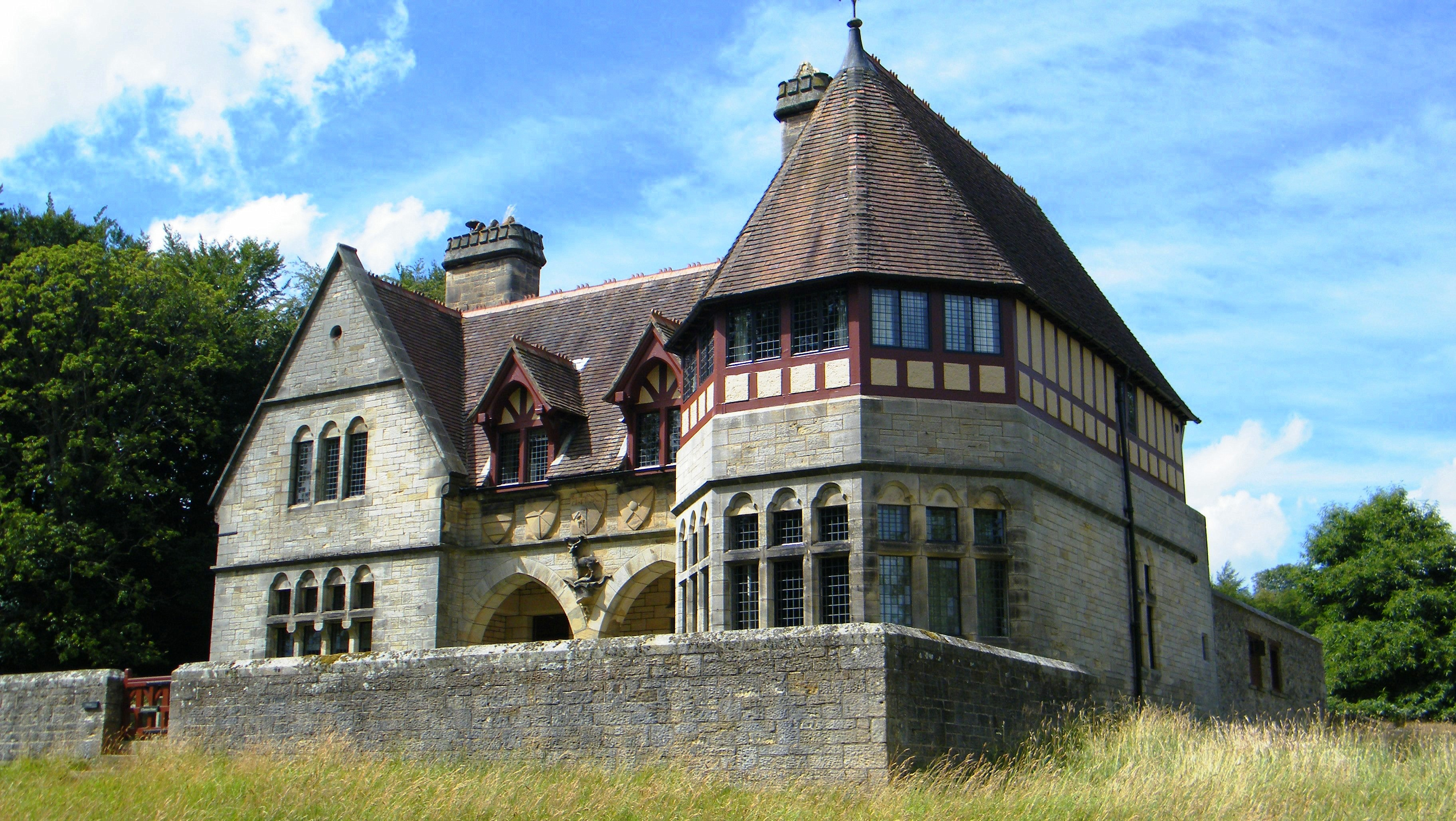
The building, in 2013

Choristers' House, also known as The Cottage or Church Cottage, is a historic building on the Studley Royal World Heritage Site in North Yorkshire, in England.

The house was designed by William Burges, and was constructed in 1873, with funding from George Robinson, 1st Marquess of Ripon. It was associated with Burges' St Mary's Church, Studley Royal, and Robinson originally intended for it to house a music school or choir, the church organist, and its music master. However, it appears that it served as a parsonage. It was extended between 1909 and 1930, and was grade II* listed, along with its wall and gate, in 1986. It has more recently served as holiday accommodation.

The house is built of gritstone, and has a red tile roof with crested ridge tiles, a lead pinnacle and a finial. It has two storeys and three bays. On the front, the middle bay is recessed, and contains a portico with two chamfered slightly pointed arches, over which are carved shields and a badge, and two dormers with curved bargeboards. The left bay is gabled, and contains a four-light mullioned and transomed window and a three-light mullioned window above. The right bay projects and is canted; the upper floor is timber framed. At the rear, on the left, is a large timber framed gable approached by external stone steps, and to the right is a two-storey tower with a pyramidal roof. The front wall has chamfered coping, and it contains a gateway with three steps.

== See also ==
- Grade II* listed buildings in North Yorkshire (district)
- Listed buildings in Lindrick with Studley Royal and Fountains
