= Listed buildings in Lindrick with Studley Royal and Fountains =

Lindrick with Studley Royal and Fountains is a civil parish in the county of North Yorkshire, England. It contains 57 listed buildings that are recorded in the National Heritage List for England. Of these, seven are listed at Grade I, the highest of the three grades, seven are at Grade II*, the middle grade, and the others are at Grade II, the lowest grade. The parish dos not contain any settlements, and much of it is occupied by Studley Royal Park, which contains many listed garden and water features. Listed buildings of major importance include the ruins of Fountains Abbey, the country house, Fountains Hall, St Mary's Church, the Banqueting House, and the Temple of Piety. Outside the park, the listed buildings include bridges.

== Key ==
Grade	Criteria
I	Buildings of exceptional interest, sometimes considered to be internationally important
II*	Particularly important buildings of more than special interest
II	Buildings of national importance and special interest

== Buildings ==
Name and location	Photograph	Date	Notes	Grade
Fountains Abbey and ancillary buildings 54.10999°N 1.58121°W		1132	The abbey buildings, now in ruins, include a church, a cloister, a chapter house, dormitories and refectories, the abbot's house, and infirmaries. The church has a nave, north and south aisles, north and south transepts, a north tower, a choir, chapels and a presbytery. The tower has five stages on a moulded plinth, with angle buttresses, statues in niches, and an embattled parapet. In the grounds are two bridges, and along the river is walling.	I
Abbey Mill; 54.10891°N 1.58460°W		Mid-12th century	A watermill that was extended through the centuries, and closed in 1937. It is in gritstone with a stone slate roof, and has three stories and five bays, and a two-storey two-bay extension to the north. On the east front is a round-arched doorway, other round-arched openings and four stepped buttresses. The west front has similar openings and an attached wheelhouse. On the left return are external steps leading to a round-arched doorway with a chamfered surround, and in both returns are square-headed windows.	I
Weir east of Fountains Abbey; 54.10992°N 1.57882°W		Medieval (probable)	The weir on the River Skell to the ast of the abbey is in gritstone. It is about 1 metre (3 ft 3 in) tall and 4 metres (13 ft) wide, and consists of a sloping ramp of coursed stones, with overhanging coping of massive blocks.	II
Weir west of the reservoir 54.11043°N 1.57479°W		Medieval (probable)	The weir on the River Skell to the west of The Reservoir is in gritstone. It is about 1 metre (3 ft 3 in) tall and 4 metres (13 ft) wide, and consists of a sloping ramp of coursed stones, with overhanging coping of massive blocks.	II
Fountains Hall; 54.10974°N 1.58643°W		1588–1611	A country house, later used for other purposes, it is in grey limestone with a stone slate roof. There is a central block of two storeys and a basement and three bays, flanked by projecting gabled wings with four storeys and basements, outside which are five-storey projecting towers. The central entrance is round-headed, and has paired fluted Ionic columns with statues, some in niches, and above is a balustraded balcony. Above the balcony is a semicircular oriel window with five lights. Most of the windows on the front are mullioned and transomed. Each flanking wing has a three-storey bay window, and a mullioned window in the shaped gable. The towers have moulded string courses and embattled parapets.	I
Steps, gate piers and walls south of Fountains Hall; 54.10957°N 1.58642°W		Early 17th century	The structures are in pink and grey limestone. The main entrance to the grounds is approached by seven steps. The gate piers are square in section with coupled baluster-like columns and are surmounted by blocks, the left block with an inscription and the right block a sundial. The piers are flanked by low walls with moulded coping, and they end in round piers. The wall returns to the house; the east wall contains a gateway, and the west wall a porch.	II
Walls, terraces and steps north of Fountains Hall; 54.10983°N 1.58608°W	—	Early 17th century	The revetment walls, terraces and steps to the north of the house are in limestone, and run for about 50 metres (160 ft). Low walls flank the flights of steps, and the third-floor terrace is linked to a door by a bridge. In the basement and on the ground floor are blocked doorways.	II
Weir at north end of the canal, piers, fishing pavilions and balustrade 54.11668°N 1.57271°W		1716–28	The weir is in gritstone and has a cascade of four steps. It is flanked by piers with bands of frosted rustication and ball finials. Outside these are balustraded walls leading to fishing pavilions over double-arched sluices. Each pavilion has a Venetian window, a moulded eaves cornice, and a pyramidal roof with a ball finial and a weathervane. Each revetment wall has a stone mask and a water spout with a stone basin.	II*
Canal, Drum Falls and weir inlet 54.11508°N 1.57346°W		c. 1718	The canal is about 500 metres (1,600 ft) long and 10 metres (33 ft) wide, and is angled near the weir called Drum Falls. It has gritstone walls and a puddled clay base. On the east side is a segmental arch covering a sluice outlet.	I
Weir, cascade, walls and ford 54.11861°N 1.57025°W		c. 1720	The weir carries water over a cascade from the lake to the River Skell. It is in gritstone and is crossed by a ford with stone setts and walls of large blocks. The ford is about 3 metres (9.8 ft) wide, the weir is about 3 metres (9.8 ft) tall, and the flanking walls have segmental-arched sluice outlets.	II
Ripon Gates, walls and lodges 54.12438°N 1.55975°W		Early 18th century	The gateway, walls and lodges are in stone. The gateway has a central round arch flanked by flat-headed pedestrian gateways. These are surrounded by vermiculated rusticated quoins and voussoirs, and the round arch has a keystone with a mask. Above is a deep modillion eaves cornice and four ball finials. The gates are in wrought iron, and in the central arch is an overthrow with a fan pattern. The gateway is linked to the lodges by walls. Each lodge has one storey, a T-shaped plan and three bays. The doorway has a Gibbs surround, a tripartite keystone and an open pediment, and the windows are sashes. Above is a modillion eaves cornice and an open gable pediment, and at the rear is a canted bay window.	II*
Sphinx and pedestal north of the waterfall 54.11866°N 1.57050°W	—	c. 1727	The pedestal is in ashlar, the statue of a sphinx is in limestone, and the overall height is about 1.5 metres (4 ft 11 in). The pedestal has a moulded profile, and the statue has a weathered head and a light headdress.	II
Sphinx and pedestal south of the waterfall 54.11840°N 1.57034°W	—	c. 1727	The pedestal is in ashlar, the statue of a sphinx is in limestone, and the overall height is about 1.5 metres (4 ft 11 in). The pedestal has a moulded profile, and the statue has a weathered head and a light headdress.	II
Half Moon Pond; 54.11568°N 1.57389°W		1728	The pond in the water garden has stone walls and is lined in clay. It has parallel semicircular sides joined by straight sides.	II*
Moon and Crescent Ponds; 54.11444°N 1.57276°W		1728	The ponds in the water garden have stone walls and are lined in clay. In the centre is a circular pond with a submerged causeway, and it is flanked by crescent-shaped ponds.	II*
Banqueting House; 54.11525°N 1.57600°W		1728–32	The building is in stone with a hipped Westmorland slate roof, one storey and three bays. In the centre is a doorway with a round-arched fanlight, flanked by round-arched sash windows. Each opening has rusticated voussoirs, and a keystone with a mask, and under each window is a balustrade. Six pilasters with banded rustication carry a cornice and a balustraded parapet with ball finials. On the sides are rusticated apsidal projections with domed roofs.	I
High Stables; 54.12525°N 1.57633°W		1728–32	The stable block, later converted into houses, is in stone, with rusticated quoins and a stone slate roof. It consists of four ranges, with one and two storeys, round a square courtyard, with two-storey towers on the corners. The east front has a seven-bay arcade, consisting of round arches with keystones, a moulded cornice, and a parapet with ball finials. The towers have a sash window in an architrave on each floor, the window on the lower floor with a cornice and a pediment, and each tower is surmounted by a pyramidal roof with a copper ball finial and a weathervane. In the centre of the rear range is a cupola with a shallow pointed roof and a ball finial.	II*
The Octagon Tower; 54.11593°N 1.57210°W		1728–32	The tower is in stone, it has an octagonal plan, and three stages on a deep plinth. The entrance on the east side is approached by eight steps flanked by outward curving walls with pointed coping and piers with ball finials. The doors have a porch with buttresses containing arched niches. In the bottom stage are round-arched sash windows with moulded hood moulds, and the middle stage contains recesses with pointed arches. In the top stage are quatrefoil openings, above which is a parapet and crocketed finials.	II*
Gates, piers and walls, Lindrick Gate; 54.12810°N 1.57555°W	—	Before 1729 (probable)	Flanking the entrance are two pairs of rusticated gate piers, each with a banded ball and cushion finial. These are flanked by walls containing six intermediate rusticated piers with shallow pyramidal caps. The gates are in wrought iron.	II
Temple of Fame; 54.11305°N 1.57135°W		1729	An open rotunda with eight Roman Doric columns. The podium and pillar bases are in gritstone, on a platform on three steps. The columns are wooden, with a fluted entablature and paterae, and a modillion cornice, over which is a parapet and a lead-covered dome.	II
Rustic bridge at the south end of the canal, culvert and arch 54.11224°N 1.57286°W		1729–30 (probable)	The culvert between the canal and the reservoir is in limestone and tufa. It is about 15 metres (49 ft) long, dog-legged, and with a segmental arch at the south end. The portal at the north end is known as the Rustic Bridge. This consists of a shallow segmental arch flanked by smaller arched recesses, and there are end piers with frosted rustication. The voussoirs of the arch and recesses, and the parapet, are in tufa.	II
Boat house 54.11711°N 1.57431°W	—	c. 1730 (probable)	The boat house is in gritstone, and it consists of two vaults that are approached from a trap door above. On the lake side are two round arches.	II
Grotto; 54.11267°N 1.57184°W		c. 1730 (probable)	The grotto is in tufa and limestone, and is partly cut into the rock, forming an artificial cave about 3 metres (9.8 ft) wide.. It has a segmental-arched entrance of tufa blocks, and a barrel vaulted roof.	II
Mr Aislabie's Kitchen; 54.11585°N 1.57189°W	—	c. 1730	The remains of a covered cooking hearth in limestone and brick. It has an arched roof, but the front has collapsed. The structure is about 3 metres (9.8 ft) long and 4 metres (13 ft) wide, and it contains a brick fireplace, partly whitewashed.	II
Quebec monument 54.11271°N 1.57254°W		c. 1730	A stone pillar that was reconstructed in about 1970, it is about 2.5 metres (8 ft 2 in) tall. It has a high moulded plinth, a shaft with two courses of frosted rustication, and a moulded cornice. The pillar is surmounted by a banded ball and cushion finial.	II
Statue on west side of north Crescent Pond; 54.11510°N 1.57296°W		c. 1730	The statue depicts Euricles and a tortoise on a pedestal. The figure is in lead and the pedestal is in stone, with an overall height of about 3 metres (9.8 ft). The pedestal has a moulded base and a cornice, and the figure rests one foot on a rock which the tortoise attempts to climb.	II
Statue and pedestal on west side of south Crescent Pond; 54.11388°N 1.57356°W		c. 1730	The statue depicts Bacchus, it is in lead, it stands on a stone pedestal, and the overall height is about 3 metres (9.8 ft). The pedestal has a moulded base and a cornice. The figure of Bacchus has a tail and horns, he wears a goatskin holding fruit, and he is feeding an animal.	II
Statue and pedestal on west side of the canal, north end 54.11563°N 1.57351°W		c. 1730	The statue is in lead, on a stone pedestal. The pedestal has a moulded base and a cornice, and the statue depicts two men wrestling. It is a copy of the original in Florence.	II
Statue and pedestal on west side of the canal, south end 54.11258°N 1.57371°W		c. 1730	The statue is in limestone on an ashlar pedestal. The pedestal has a moulded plinth and a cornice, and the overall height is about 3 metres (9.8 ft). The statue depicts Hercules wrestling Anteus; Hercules is supported by a tree trunk, and lifts Anteus high into the air.	II
The canal gates and walls 54.11671°N 1.57436°W		c. 1730	The ornate gates and the overthrow are in wrought iron; the gates with scrolled decoration, and the overthrow with scrolls, foliage in phosphor bronze, and a shield in lead. The flanking piers are about 4 metres (13 ft) tall, and each pier has a moulded base, and a cornice surmounted by a tall urn with garlands and masks. Each flanking wall contains a round-arched pedestrian gateway with pilaster buttresses and ball finials. On the right is a small lodge house built against the wall.	II
Tunnel and flanking wall 54.11594°N 1.57229°W		c. 1730	The tunnel is partly rock-cut, and partly in limestone and tufa, and is about 50 metres (160 ft) long. The north and south entrances have round arches with voussoirs and a keystone. Attached to the left of the south entrance is a wall about 1.5 metres (4 ft 11 in) tall and 3 metres (9.8 ft) long, containing a narrow round-arched opening.	II
Weir and reservoir below Tent Hill; 54.11214°N 1.57099°W		c. 1730	The reservoir is in the shape of an ox-bow, and almost encircles Tent Hill. At the west end is a weir in gritstone about 1 metre (3 ft 3 in) tall.	II
Ford over River Skell; 54.11823°N 1.56781°W		c. 1740	The ford carries a track across the River Skell. It is about 3 metres (9.8 ft) wide, and is paved with gritstone setts, and flanked by curbs.	II
Mackershaw Lodge; 54.11202°N 1.56356°W		c. 1740	The gateway and flanking lodges are in limestone, and are in ruins. The central round-arched gateway has massive voussoirs and a keystone, and is flanked by flat-headed pedestrian gateways, over which are round-arched recesses. Above these is a modillion eaves cornice, and three bases for statues. The flanking lodges each has a Venetian window with an impost band, a modillion eaves cornice and a pediment.	II
Rustic bridge about 300 metres southeast of outlet, ford and weir 54.11743°N 1.56620°W	—	c. 1740	The ford and weir on the River Skell are in gritstone. The ford is about 3 metres (9.8 ft) wide. It is lined with setts and flanked by curb stones, and the downstream edge forms a weir. The bridge, which is later, is in gritstone, boulders and tufa blocks. It consists of a single segmental arch with voussoirs, a stone crest to the parapet, and has large boulders as terminals.	II
Rustic bridge about 350 metres southeast of outlet and ford to the south 54.11714°N 1.56589°W	—	c. 1740	The ford on the River Skell is in gritstone and about 3 metres (9.8 ft) wide. It is lined with setts and flanked by curb stones. The bridge, which is later, is in gritstone, boulders and tufa blocks. It consists of a single segmental arch with voussoirs, a stone crest to the parapet, and has large boulders as terminals.	II
Rustic bridge about 500 metres southeast of outlet and ford to the north 54.11691°N 1.56372°W	—	c. 1740	The ford on the River Skell is in gritstone and about 3 metres (9.8 ft) wide. It is lined with setts and flanked by curb stones. The bridge, which is later, is in gritstone, boulders and tufa blocks. It consists of a single segmental arch with voussoirs, a stone crest to the parapet, and has large boulders as terminals.	II
Rustic bridge about 700 metres southeast of outlet and ford to the south 54.11663°N 1.55954°W	—	c. 1740	The ford on the River Skell is in gritstone and about 3 metres (9.8 ft) wide. It is lined with setts and flanked by curb stones. The bridge, which is later, is in gritstone, boulders and tufa blocks. It consists of a single segmental arch with voussoirs, a stone crest to the parapet, and has large boulders as terminals.	II
The Devils Chimney; 54.11730°N 1.56578°W	—	c. 1740	A gazebo on the edge of a cliff, it is in gritstone on a plinth, with a flat roof of massive slabs. On the east side is a doorway, and on the other sides are square windows; all have a lintel with rock-faced rustication.	II
Temple of Piety; 54.11425°N 1.57180°W		1742	The temple is in rendered brick and stone, and has a Westmorland slate roof with lead verges. On the front is a portico of six Roman Doric columns on a gritstone pavement, with an entablature, a pediment and a pedestal. The central doorway has an architrave with a mask keystone, and is flanked by pairs of windows in architraves. In each of the returns is a doorway in an eared surround with a triple keystone.	I
Statue of Neptune and pedestal 54.11439°N 1.57274°W		c. 1750	The statue of Neptune is in the centre of Moon Pond. It is in lead, and stands on a stone pedestal.	II
Rough bridge 54.12668°N 1.57292°W		Mid-18th century	The bridge is in limestone and gritstone, and has two round arches, one larger and the other smaller. The parapet consists of massive boulders, and the soffits are rendered with cement and lined to imitate blocks.	II
Wheatbrig's House; 54.12815°N 1.56737°W	cntre	Mid-18th century	The house is in red brick on a stone plinth, with stone dressings, sill bands, a stone parapet with pineapple finials, and a hipped Westmorland slate roof. There are two storeys and three bays, the middle bay projecting under a pediment containing an oculus in an architrave. In the centre is a doorway in an architrave, flanked by sash windows in architraves. In the left bay is a canted bay window, and in the right bay and the upper floor are sash windows in architraves. To the right is a single-storey two-bay extension, and on the left wall is a lean-to conservatory.	II
Woodhouse Bridge; 54.13564°N 1.59953°W		Mid to late 18th century	The bridge carries a track over the River Laver. It is in stone and consists of three round arches with keystones, the middle arch the largest. There are pointed cutwaters carried up as pilasters to the flat-topped parapet, and there si a projecting band following the line of the track.	II
Game larder 54.12808°N 1.57430°W		Late 18th century	The game larder is in limestone on a plinth, with quoins, a sill band, and a pyramidal purple slate roof with a wooden finial. There is a single storey and a square plan. The doorway has a plain surround, at the rear is an opening with a segmental arch and a keystone, and the windows are square.	II
Old Slaughterhouse, clock face and mechanism 54.12828°N 1.57503°W		Late 18th century	The outbuilding is in stone, with quoins, and a hipped pantile roof. There are two storeys and three bays, the left bay recessed. In the left bay is a blocked cart entrance, and a doorway with a segmental arch of voussoirs. The other bays contain a similar doorway and a three-light window. In the gable of the left return is a two-faced clock with its mechanism.	II
Rustic bridge about 150 metres east of outlet 54.11864°N 1.56786°W	—	Late 18th century (probable)	The bridge carries a footpath over the River Skell. It is in gritstone, with boulders and tufa blocks. The bridge consists of a single segmental arch with rubble voussoirs and keystones. It has large boulders as terminals, and a rubble crest to the parapet.	II
Anne Boleyn's Seat; 54.11166°N 1.56890°W		Before 1790 (probable)	A shelter in wood. On the west front are three slender Gothick arches on quatrefoil columns, and an elaborate embattled parapet. At the rear is a narrow entrance and a similar parapet, and the side walls are blank.	II
Laver Banks Bridge; 54.14372°N 1.59099°W	—	Late 18th to early 19th century	The bridge carries Galphay Lane over the River Laver. It is in gritstone, and consists of a central segmental arch and two narrower flanking arches. There are no cutwaters, and the piers rise as shallow buttresses. There is a projecting band at road level, and the parapet has shallow gabled coping.	II
Robin Hood's Well; 54.10978°N 1.57795°W		Late 18th to early 19th century (probable)	The cover for a spring, it is in gritstone, and consists of a round chamfered arch about 2 metres (6 ft 7 in) tall, over which is a hood mould with spiral stops. The arch is flanked by short walls.	II
Wall east of Wheatbrig's House; 54.12832°N 1.56466°W	—	Early 19th century or before	The wall forms the eastern boundary of the Studley Royal estate,. It is about 4 metres (13 ft) tall and 100 metres (330 ft) long, with a change in the angle at the centre. The northern part is in limestone with three bands of white blocks alternating with grey, and the southern part is in brick with the limestone blocks continuing, both parts with stone coping.	II
The Obelisk; 54.11844°N 1.58134°W		c. 1850	The obelisk is in stone and is about 15 metres (49 ft) tall. It is diagonally set on a base and a corniced pedestal about 3 metres (9.8 ft) tall.	II
Stewards House; 54.11669°N 1.57411°W		c. 1860	The house, later used for other purposes, is in rendered brick, with quoins, a modillion eaves cornice, oversailing eaves, and a hipped Westmorland slate roof. There are two storeys and three bays, the middle bay projecting slightly and gabled. The central doorway has a fanlight, it is flanked by iron-framed bay windows, and the windows on the upper floor also have iron frames.	II
St Mary's Church, Studley Royal; 54.11875°N 1.58018°W		1871–78	The church, designed by William Burges, is built in grey limestone with a grey slate roof. It consists of a nave with a clerestory, north and south aisles, a south porch, a chancel and a west steeple. The steeple has a tower with two stages, buttresses, a west doorway, a four-light west window, and on the south side is a stair turret. The upper stage is octagonal, with octagonal spirelets on the corners, and the bell openings have gablets. The tower is surmounted by a spire with two tiers of lucarnes, and a weathercock.	I
The Cottage, wall and gate 54.11942°N 1.57860°W		1873	The house, designed by William Burges, is in gritstone, and has a red tile roof with crested ridge tiles, a lead pinnacle and a finial. There are two storeys and three bays. On the front, the middle bay is recessed, and contains a portico with two chamfered slightly pointed arches, over which are carved shields and a badge, and two dormers with curved bargeboards. The left bay is gabled, and contains a four-light mullioned and transomed window and a three-light mullioned window above. The right bay projects and is canted; the upper floor is timber framed. At the rear, on the left, is a large timber framed gable approached by external stone steps, and to the right is a two-storey tower with a pyramidal roof. The front wall has chamfered coping, and it contains a gateway with three steps.	II*
Wall and gates, St Mary's Church, Studley Royal; 54.11862°N 1.58063°W		c. 1875	The wall and gates were designed by William Burges. The wall is in gritstone with chamfered coping, it is about 2 metres (6 ft 7 in) tall, and it encloses the churchyard on all four sides. There are two sets of gate piers, each about 3 metres (9.8 ft) tall, with an embattled cap. The gates are wooden with wrought iron fittings.	II
The Pheasantry, wall, railings and gate 54.11650°N 1.58116°W	—	c. 1875	The house is in gritstone, and has a roof of purple and grey slate. There are two storeys and an irregular plan. On the right of the northeast front is a two-stage tower containing a doorway with a moulded surround and a four-centred arch, and a pyramidal roof with an iron corona. To the left is a wide projecting bay containing a bay window and a cornice with hound masks. Above is a mullioned window, over which is a carved stag's head under a pointed hood mould. The garden wall has railings with scrolled finials, the gate piers have pointed caps, and the gates have trefoil finials.	II
