= Obelisk (disambiguation) =

An obelisk is a tall, four-sided monument.

Obelisk may also refer to:

== Geography ==
- Obelisk Beach, a beach in New South Wales, Australia
- Obelisk Col, a mountain pass on James Ross Island in Antarctica
- Obelisk Mountain, a mountain in Antarctica
- Obelisk Hill, a former name of Monument Hill, the site of the Fremantle War Memorial
- Obelisk Islet, an island in the Torres Strait in Queensland, Australia

== Fiction ==
- Obelisk, a fictional weapon in the game Command & Conquer
- Obelisk the Tormentor, a Yu-Gi-Oh! God card
- "The Obelisk", a minicomic in the Masters of the Universe comic line

== Music ==
- The Obelisk, a predecessor of the alternative band The Cure
- "Obelisk", a song by the metalcore band Northlane from the album Node

== Structures ==
- The Obelisk, Castle Howard, a structure in England
- The Obelisk, Studley Royal, a structure in England
- Obelisk (Sanssouci), a structure at the eastern entrance to Sanssouci Park in Potsdam, Germany

== Other uses ==
- Obelisk (biology), a class of viroid-like elements
- Obelisk (hieroglyph), an Ancient Egyptian hieroglyph
- Obelisk (typography) or dagger (†), a typographical symbol
- Obelisk posture, a position that some dragonflies and damselflies assume to avoid overheating
- Obelisk (Prague Castle), a monolith and World War I monument in Prague, Czech Republic
- Obelisk Press, a Paris publisher
- Obelisk ship, a type of ship historically used to transport obelisks
- The Obelisk, a painting by Hubert Robert (1733-1808)
- The Obelisks of Enlightenment, a fictional monster created by analog horror film maker Doctor Nowhere

== See also ==
- Monolith, a large block of stone with ceremonial purposes
- Obelism, the practice of annotating manuscripts with marks set in the margins.
  - Dagger (mark) (†), a type of obelism, is called an obelisk in older texts
  - Obelus, a type of obelism; the name of the symbol (÷) in older texts
- Obelix, a character in the Asterix comic strips
- Stele, a stone or wooden slab erected as a marker
