= Fountains Mill =

Building in North Yorkshire, England

Coordinates: 54.1089°N 1.5846°W

The mill in 2026

Fountains Mill, sometimes known as Abbey Mill, is a historic building at Fountains Abbey, a World Heritage Site in North Yorkshire, in England.

The watermill was built in the 1130s or 1140s on a leet from the River Skell, as a corn mill for the abbey. It originally had a single wheel at the southern end, but it was rebuilt in the 1150s atop a dam, with a wheel at each end. In the 13th century, the upper storey was added, to serve as a granary. The Abbey closed in 1539 with the Dissolution of the Monasteries, following which the north end was demolished and replaced with a new single-storey section. The mill continued in use, and in 1840 was converted into a sawmill, the current waterwheel being installed at this time. In 1928 a turbine was installed to convert the building to the production of electricity. The mill closed in 1937, and the building then served various uses including refugee accommodation and a stonemason's workshop. It was restored in 1993 for use as a museum and exhibition space. It is the most substantial Cistercian mill to survive. The building has been grade I listed since 1986, and is also a scheduled monument.

The mill is built of gritstone with a stone slate roof, and has three stories and five bays, and a two-storey two-bay extension to the north. On the east front is a round-arched doorway, other round-arched openings and four stepped buttresses. The west front has similar openings and an attached wheelhouse. On the left return are external steps leading to a round-arched doorway with a chamfered surround, and in both returns are square-headed windows.

== See also ==
- Grade I listed buildings in North Yorkshire (district)
- Listed buildings in Lindrick with Studley Royal and Fountains
