= Ripon Gates =

Gateway in North Yorkshire, England

Coordinates: 54°07′28″N 1°33′35″W

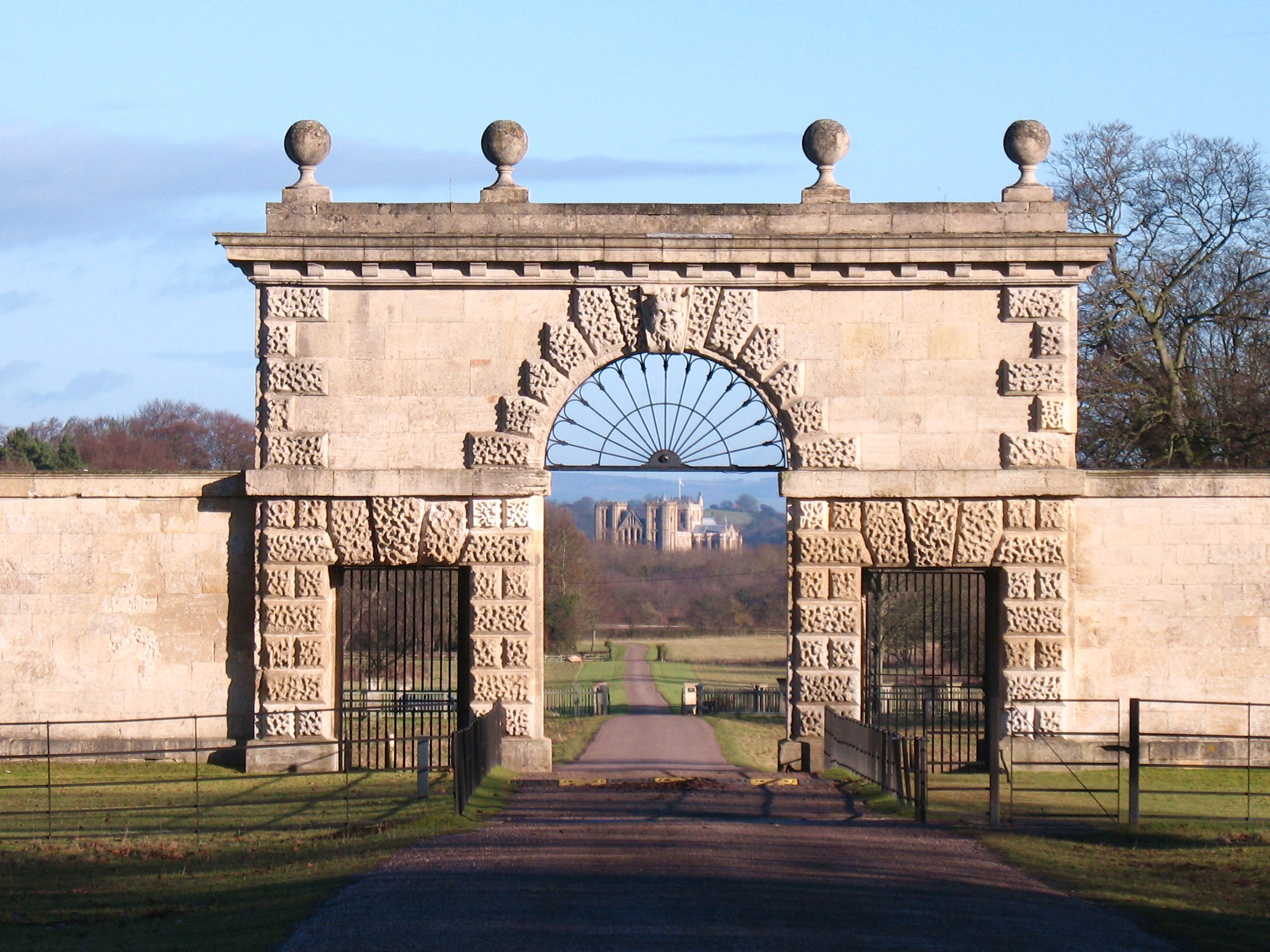
The gateway, in 2011

The Ripon Gates are a historic structure at Studley Royal, a World Heritage Site in North Yorkshire, in England.

George Aislabie commissioned Leo Metcalf to build the gateway at the east entrance to Studley Royal, and it was completed in 1685. It was originally known as Studley Great Gate. The lodges either side of the gates – Golf Cottage and East Lodge – were added in the early 18th century, probably with input to the design from Colen Campbell. The lodges were enlarged in 1840. The gateway, walls and lodges were grade II* listed in 1967.

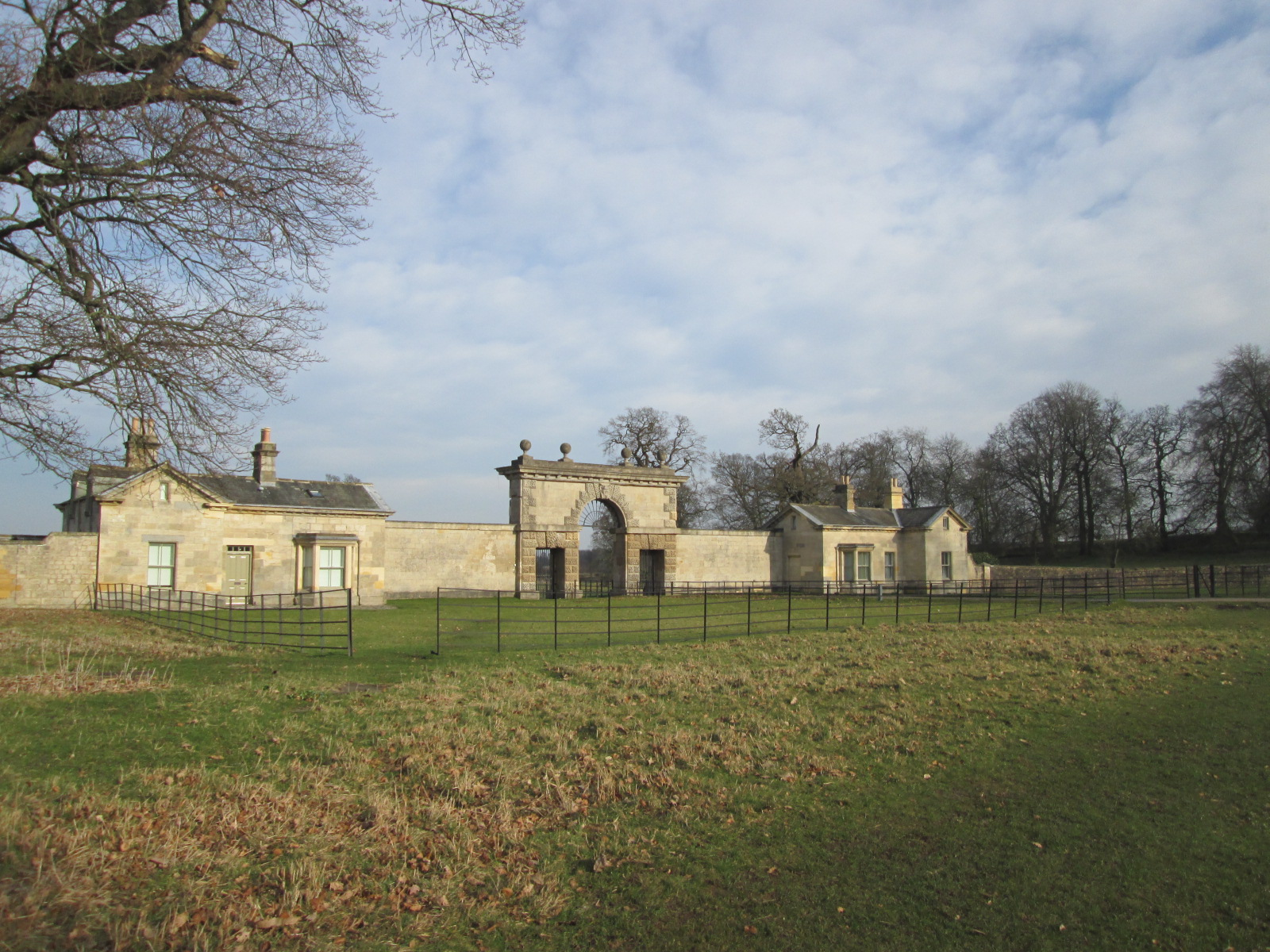
Wide view showing the lodges and connecting walls

The gateway, walls and lodges are all built of stone. The gateway has a central round arch flanked by flat-headed pedestrian gateways. These are surrounded by vermiculated rusticated quoins and voussoirs, and the round arch has a keystone with a mask. Above is a deep modillion eaves cornice and four ball finials. The gates are in wrought iron, and in the central arch is an overthrow with a fan pattern. The gateway is linked to the lodges by walls. Each lodge has one storey, a T-shaped plan and three bays. The doorway has a Gibbs surround, a tripartite keystone and an open pediment, and the windows are sashes. Above is a modillion eaves cornice and an open gable pediment, and at the rear is a canted bay window.

== See also ==
- Grade II* listed buildings in North Yorkshire (district)
- Listed buildings in Lindrick with Studley Royal and Fountains
