= Studley Royal House =

Historic building in North Yorkshire, England

Coordinates: 54.1252°N 1.5763°W

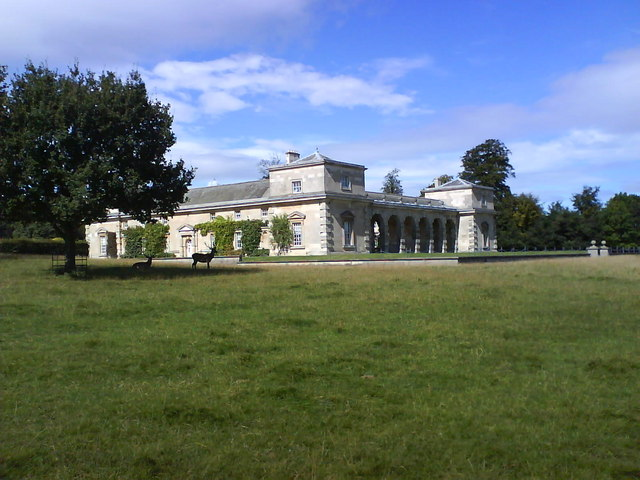
The building, in 2007

Studley Royal House is a historic building at Studley Royal, a World Heritage Site in North Yorkshire, in England.

The original Studley Royal house was built in the Tudor period, badly damaged in a fire in 1716, rebuilt and demolished after a second fire in 1946. As part of the 18th-century rebuilding, John Aislabie commissioned John Simpson and Robert Doe to design racing stables. Their designs may have been influenced by Colen Campbell and Roger Morris. The building was constructed between 1728 and 1732. Soon after completion, the north and south ranges were converted into service buildings. After the main house burned down, the whole building was converted into a replacement house, adopting the name "Studley Royal House". Several rooms were decorated with materials salvaged from the old house. The building was grade II* listed in 1967. In 2023, it was offered for sale for £6.25 million, at which time it had eight bedrooms, six reception rooms, and 2.5 acres (1.0 ha) of private grounds.

The house is built of stone, with rusticated quoins and a stone slate roof. It consists of four ranges, with one and two storeys, round a square courtyard, with two-storey towers on the corners. The east front has a seven-bay arcade, consisting of round arches with keystones, a moulded cornice, and a parapet with ball finials. The towers have a sash window in an architrave on each floor, the window in the lower floor with a cornice and a pediment, and each tower is surmounted by a pyramidal roof with a copper ball finial and a weathervane. In the centre of the rear range is a cupola with a shallow pointed roof and a ball finial. Inside, one room contains the flooring from the old house's chapel, and several have salvaged fireplaces.

== See also ==
- Grade II* listed buildings in North Yorkshire (district)
- Listed buildings in Lindrick with Studley Royal and Fountains
