= Anne Boleyn's Seat =

Historic structure in North Yorkshire, England

Coordinates: 54°06′42″N 1°34′07″W

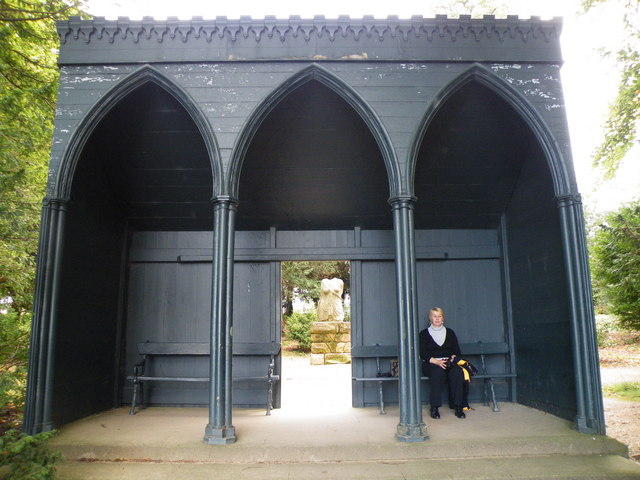
The seat, in 2008

Anne Boleyn's Seat is a historic structure at Studley Royal, a World Heritage Site in North Yorkshire, in England.

View from the shelter

The shelter, containing a seat, is at a high point in the garden, known as "Surprise View". The National Trust describes it as "the climax of the garden". The structure was commissioned by William Aislabie and was probably complete by 1790; it was initially described as a "sashed Gothic temple". A headless statue was erected nearby, and it is believed that this led to the structure being named after Anne Boleyn, who was beheaded. The structure provides a view of the ruins of Fountains Abbey, and its name may also reference the role of King Henry VIII, Boleyn's husband, in the Dissolution of the Monasteries.

The headless statue

The shelter is built of wood. On the west front are three slender Gothick arches on quatrefoil columns, and an elaborate embattled parapet. At the rear is a narrow entrance and a similar parapet, and the side walls are blank. The floor is concrete, and there are two modern benches. It has been grade II listed since 1986.

== See also ==
- Listed buildings in Lindrick with Studley Royal and Fountains
