= William Gualbert Saunders =

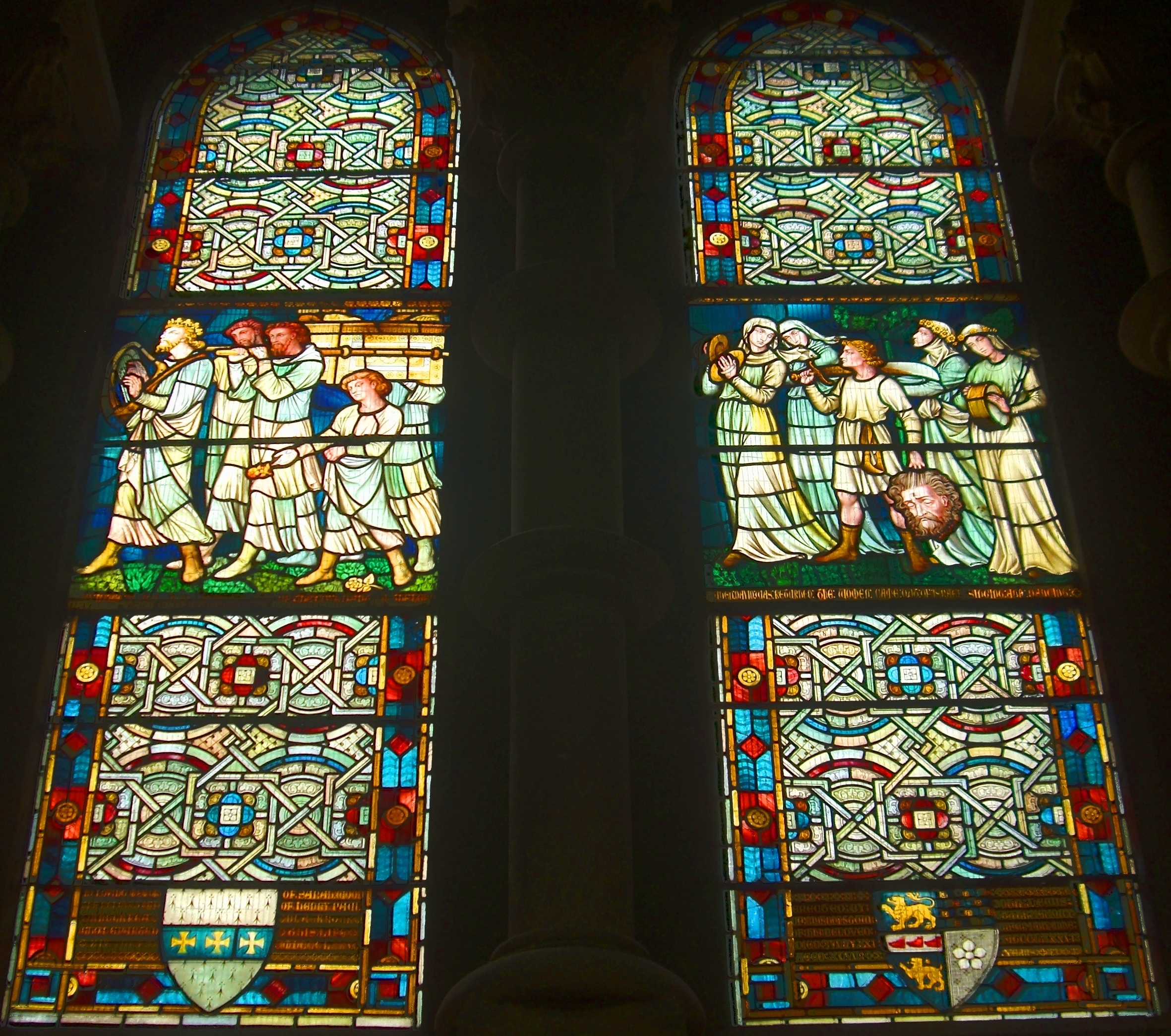
- A window at Saint Fin Barre's Cathedral
- Born: 1837
- Died: 1923 (aged 85–86)
- Notable work: Saint Fin Barre's Cathedral; Cardiff Castle; Castell Coch; St Mary's, Studley Royal

William Gualbert Saunders, known as W Gualbert Saunders, was an English designer of stained glass and founder of the stained glass manufacturers Saunders & Co. He established his manufactury at Endell Street, Covent Garden, in 1859 and subsequently worked with many of the foremost English stained glass designers.

Saunders established a long partnership with the architect William Burges, working with him on many of his major commissions, including Saint Fin Barre's Cathedral, Cardiff Castle, Castell Coch and Burges's Yorkshire churches. David Lawrence and Ann Wilson consider Burges was particularly indebted to Saunders: "his technique [gave] Burges's glass its most distinctive characteristic, namely the flesh colour. This is unique, had no precedents and has had no imitators." Lawrence and Wilson's history of St Fin Barre's has detailed commentaries on the glass there, of which Lawrence writes, "The impact created by all these glowing, coloured religious images is overwhelming and intoxicating. To enter St Fin Barre's Cathedral is an experience unparalleled in Ireland and rarely matched anywhere."

In 1880, Saunders handed the company over to his assistant William Worral and retired abroad, "apparently ceasing all artistic activity, at least in this country (although) he lived for (another) 40 years."
