= Octagon Tower =

Building in North Yorkshire, England

Coordinates: 54°06′57″N 1°34′20″W

The tower, in 2016

The Octagon Tower is a historic structure at Studley Royal, a World Heritage Site in North Yorkshire, in England.

The tower was built between 1728 and 1732, probably as a viewing platform. It was commissioned by John Aislabie, and designed by Robert Doe, probably in the neoclassical style. In the 1740s, its appearance was altered to the gothic style, and it may have been at this time that the external steps were added. The building was grade II* listed in 1967, but was ruinous at the time. In 1976, it was restored by North Yorkshire County Council, replacing about 40% of the stonework, all the windows and plaster. It is also a scheduled monument.

The tower is built of stone, has an octagonal plan, and three stages on a deep plinth. The entrance on the east side is approached by eight steps flanked by outward curving walls with pointed coping and piers with ball finials. The doors have a porch with buttresses containing arched niches. In the bottom stage are round-arched sash windows with moulded hood moulds, and the middle stage contains recesses with pointed arches. In the top stage are quatrefoil openings, above which is a parapet and crocketed finials.

== See also ==
- Grade II* listed buildings in North Yorkshire (district)
- Listed buildings in Lindrick with Studley Royal and Fountains
