= River Skell =

River in North Yorkshire, England

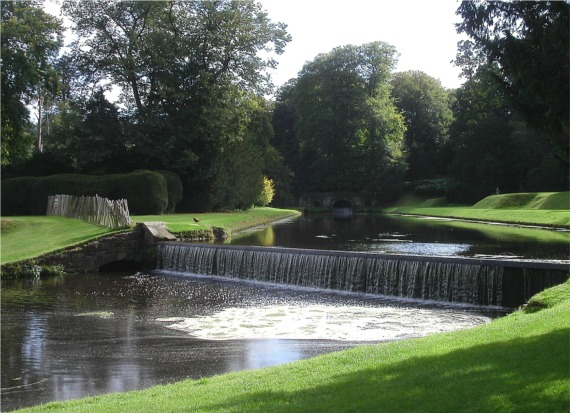
- The River Skell in Studley Royal Park

Location
- Country: England

Physical characteristics
- Source
  - location: Howson Ridge near Wath-in-Nidderdale
  - coordinates: 54°7′2″N 1°44′59″W
  - elevation: 350 metres (1,150 ft)
- Mouth
  - location: River Ure near Ripon
  - coordinates: 54°8′0″N 1°30′3″W
  - elevation: 23 metres (75 ft)
- Length: 19 km (12 mi)
- Discharge
  - average: 1.54 cubic metres per second (54 cu ft/s)

The River Skell is a 12-mile-long (19 km) tributary of the River Ure in North Yorkshire, England.

Its source is in boggy ground on moorland 2 miles (3 km) north of Pateley Bridge. For its first 2 miles (3 km) the river is known as Skell Beck. Descending from the moor the river enters Skell Gill, a narrow wooded valley. The river valley gradually broadens, but remains well wooded, passing the village of Grantley and the 17th century Grantley Hall.

The river enters Studley Royal Park and flows past Fountains Hall and the ruins of Fountains Abbey. Below the abbey the river was dammed in the 18th century to form an ornamental lake and water garden. Downstream from the park the river bed is porous rock that allows some or all of the flow to disappear underground. After this, the river re-emerges on the surface and enters the city of Ripon, and on the outskirts receives its largest tributary, the River Laver. The Skell enters the River Ure 0.5 miles (1 km) east of the centre of Ripon.

The name is from the Old Norse skjallr, meaning "resounding", from its swift and noisy course. In the Middle Ages the river was known as "Heaven Water", presumably from its association with Fountains Abbey.

The flow of the River Skell has been measured at Alma Weir in Ripon, near to its confluence with the Ure since 1984. The thirty year record shows that the catchment of 120 square kilometres (46 sq mi) to the gauging station yields an average flow of 1.54 cubic metres per second (54 cu ft/s). In June 2007 the highest river level was recorded of 1.8 metres (5 ft 11 in) over the weir, which was estimated to have a flow of 103 cubic metres per second (3,600 cu ft/s).
