= The Obelisk, Studley Royal =

Historic structure in North Yorkshire, England

Coordinates: 54°07′06″N 1°34′53″W

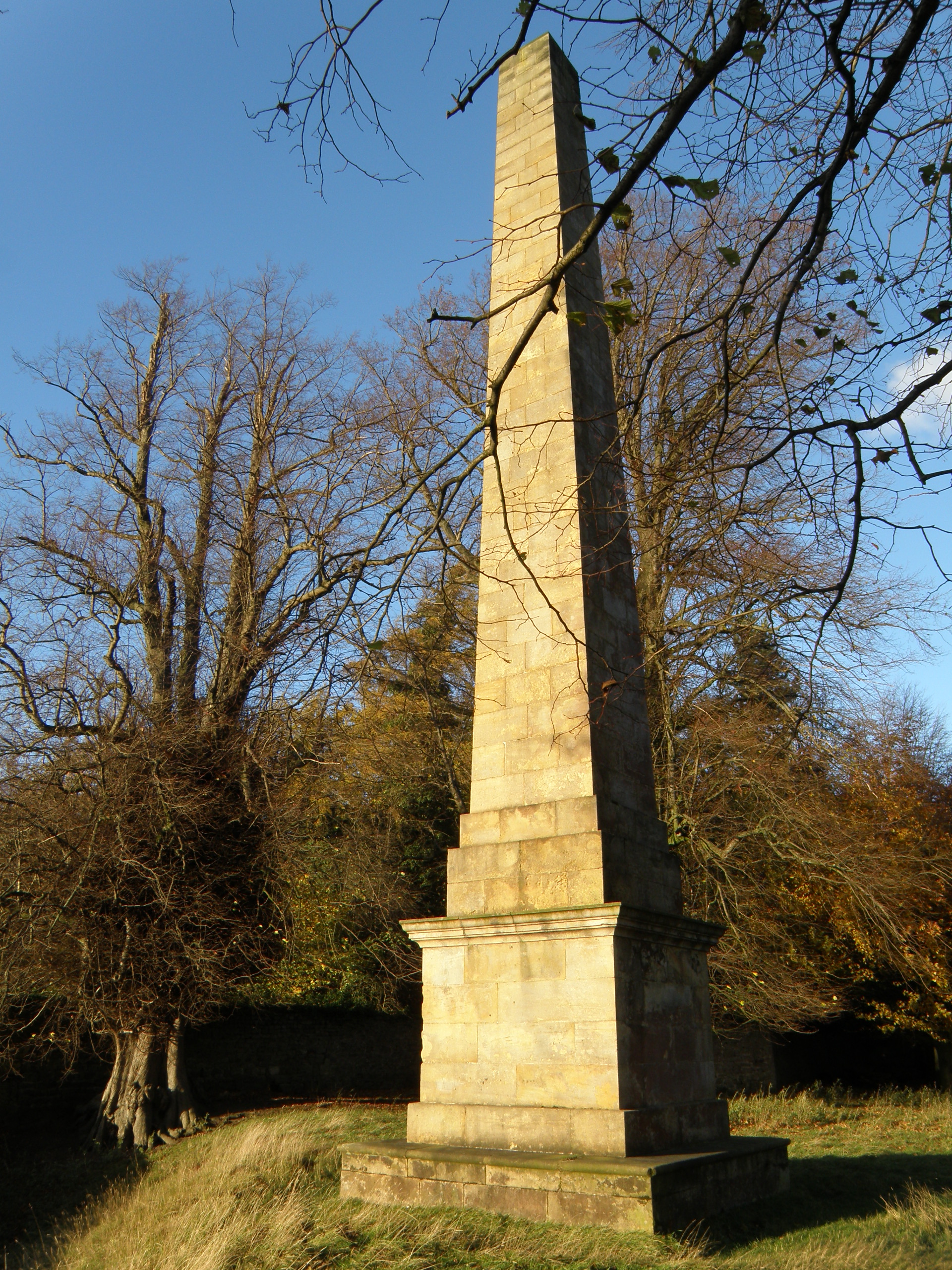
The Obelisk, in 2012

The Obelisk is a historic structure at Studley Royal, a World Heritage Site in North Yorkshire, in England.

In 1742, William Aislabie had a tall stepped pyramid erected as a memorial to his father, John Aislabie. It lay at the end of a long straight driveway, leading from Ripon. Perhaps in 1805, a timber obelisk was erected nearby, to commemorate British victory in the Battle of Waterloo. This soon fell into decay, and some time after 1812, both the pyramid and obelisk were replaced by a stone obelisk.

The obelisk is in stone and is about 15 metres (49 ft) high. It is diagonally set on a base and a corniced pedestal about 3 metres (9.8 ft) high. It has been grade II listed since 1967, and is also a scheduled monument.

== See also ==
- Listed buildings in Lindrick with Studley Royal and Fountains
