= St Mary's, Studley Royal =

St Mary's
- Church of St Mary, Studley Royal
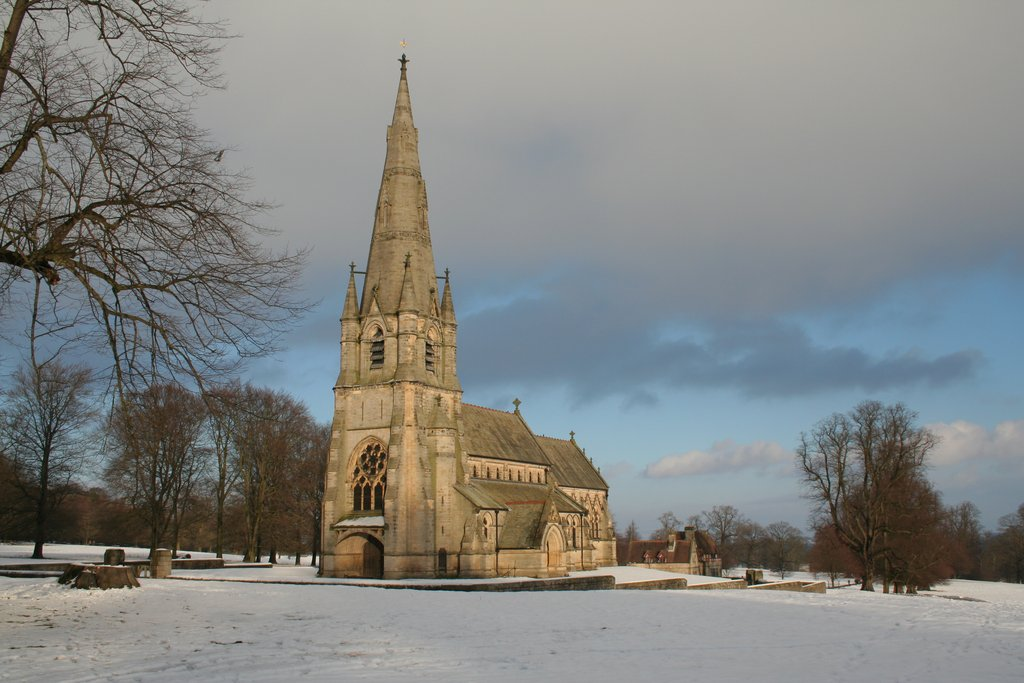
- St Mary's Church, Studley Royal (December 2009)

- Location in North Yorkshire
- 54°07′07″N 1°34′49″W
- OS grid reference: SE 27541 69291
- Location: Studley Royal, North Yorkshire
- Country: England
- Denomination: Anglican

History
- Founded: 1871-8

Architecture
- Heritage designation: Listed building - Grade I
- Architect: William Burges
- Architectural type: Gothic Revival
- Style: Early English

The Church of St Mary, Studley Royal, is a Victorian Gothic Revival church built in the Early English style by William Burges. It is located in the grounds of Studley Royal Park at Fountains Abbey, in North Yorkshire, England. Burges was commissioned by the 1st Marquess of Ripon to build the church as a memorial church to Frederick Grantham Vyner, his brother-in-law. It is one of two such churches, the other being the Church of Christ the Consoler at Skelton-on-Ure.

== History ==
Frederick Vyner had been murdered by Greek bandits in 1870 in an event known as the Dilessi massacre. A significant ransom had been demanded, and in part collected, before his death. His mother, Lady Mary Vyner, and his sister, Lady Ripon, used the unspent ransom to build the two churches in his memory. Burges' appointment as architect was most likely due to the connection between his greatest patron, John Crichton-Stuart, 3rd Marquess of Bute, and Vyner, who had been friends at Oxford. St Mary's, was commissioned in 1870 and work began in 1871. The church was consecrated in 1878.

The chestnut tree near by may be the remnant of a medieval tree-planting scheme.

== Architecture and description ==
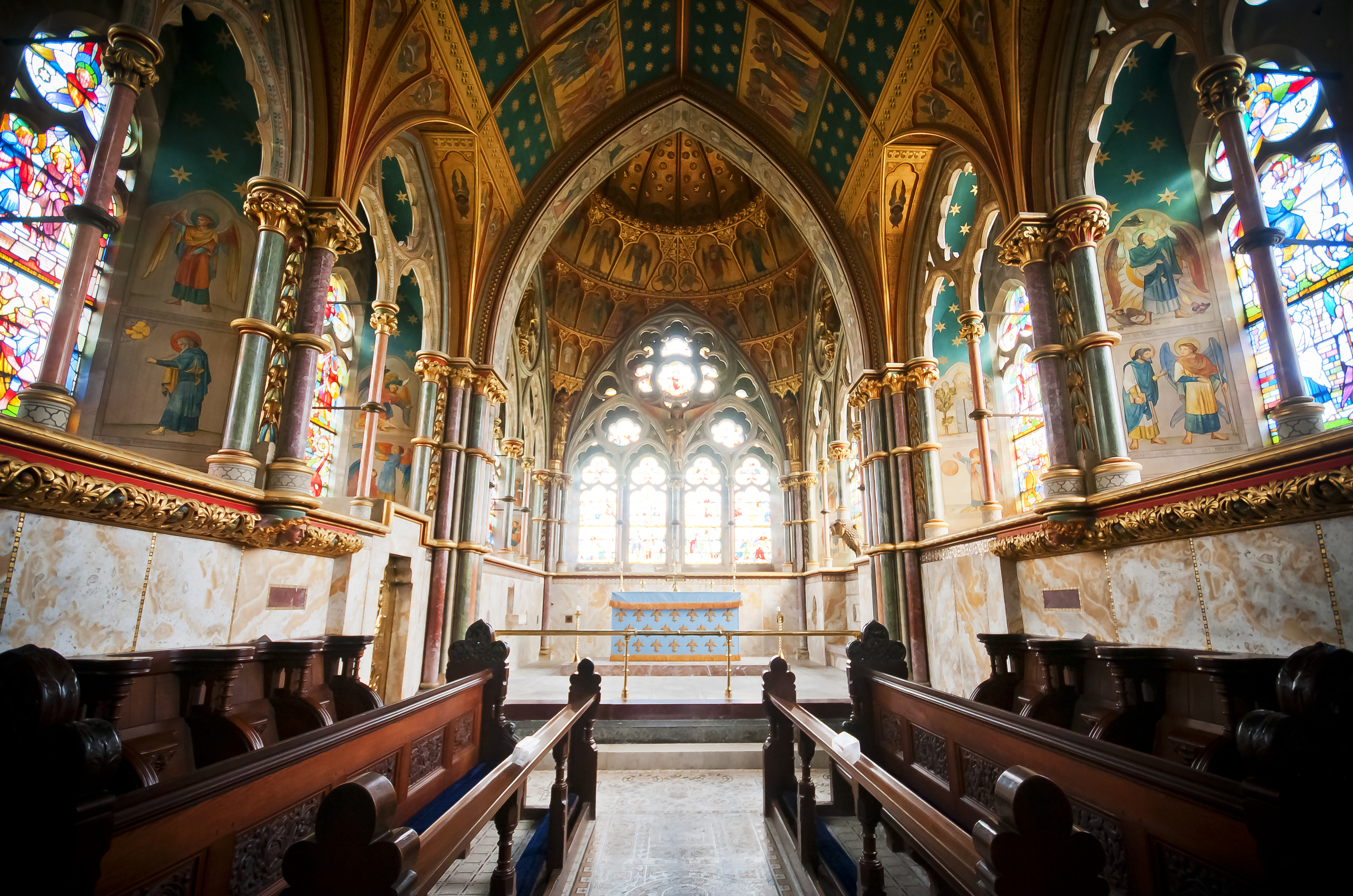
The chancel

As at Skelton, Burges's design demonstrates a move from his favoured Early-French, to an English style. Pevsner writes of "a Victorian shrine, a dream of Early English glory". The interior is spectacular, exceeding Skelton in richness and majesty. The stained-glass windows are particularly fine quality. Burges used many members of his usual architectural team: the sculpture is by Thomas Nicholls, the glass was designed by Frederick Weekes and constructed by Saunders & Co. St Mary's is Burges' "ecclesiastical masterpiece". The church is a Grade I Listed Building.

== See also ==
- Grade I listed buildings in North Yorkshire (district)
- List of churches preserved by the Churches Conservation Trust in Northern England
- Listed buildings in Lindrick with Studley Royal and Fountains
