= Fountains Hall =

Country house near Ripon, England

- Fountains Hall

- Location within North Yorkshire
- 54°06′35″N 1°35′11″W
- Type: Prodigy house
- Location: Studley Royal Park

History
- Built: 1598–1611
- Built for: Sir Stephen Proctor

Site notes
- Architectural styles: Elizabethan and Jacobean
- Owner: National Trust

Listed Building – Grade I
- Official name: Fountains Hall
- Designated: 23 April 1952
- Reference no.: 1149809

Main portal of Fountains Hall

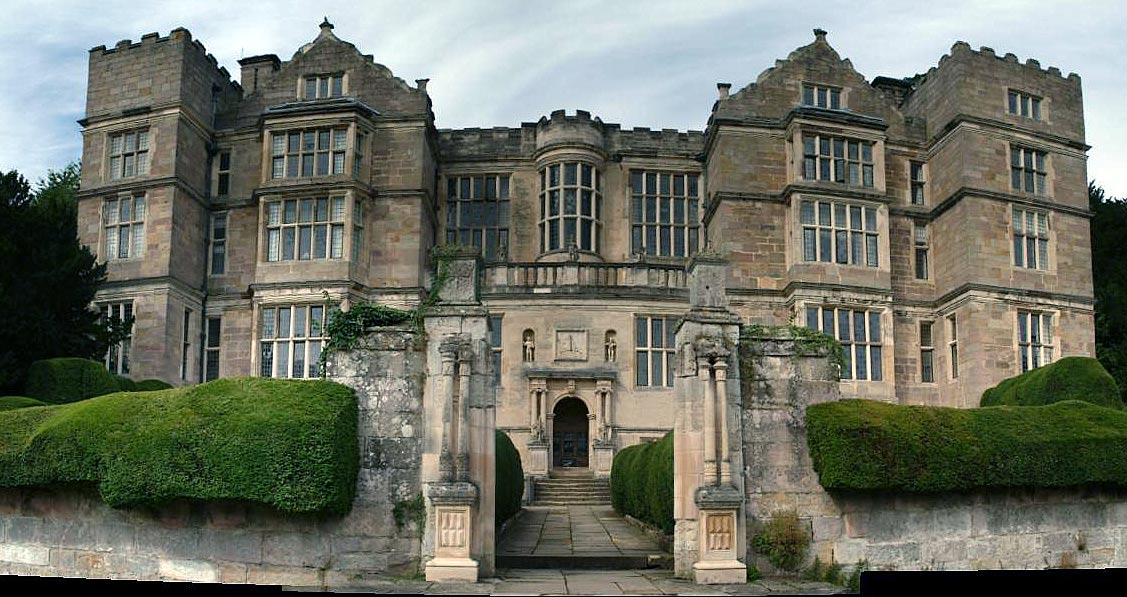
Fountains Hall

Fountains Hall is a country house near Ripon in North Yorkshire, England, located within the World Heritage Site at Studley Royal Park which include the ruins of Fountains Abbey. It belongs to the National Trust and is a Grade I listed building.

== History ==
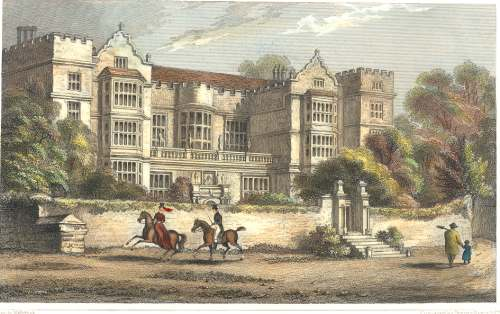
Fountains Hall in 1830

The house was built by Stephen Proctor between 1598 and 1611, partly with stone from the abbey ruins. It is an example of a late Elizabethan prodigy house, perhaps influenced by the work of Robert Smythson. In July 1604, Prince Charles travelled to London from Dunfermline Palace and stopped at Fountains Hall. According to Proctor, the visit was disrupted by a neighbour, Sir John Yorke, who was feuding with Proctor.

After Proctor's death in 1619, his widow Honor Proctor lived at Cowling Hall with their daughter Deborah Jackson, and Fountains Hall passed into the possession of the Messenger family, who sold it to William Aislabie of neighbouring Studley Royal 150 years later. Fountains Hall became redundant as the Aislabie family remained at Studley Royal. It was leased to tenants and at one time parts of it were used for farm storage.

The hall was renovated and modernised between 1928 and 1931, and the Duke and Duchess of York (later King George VI and Queen Elizabeth) often stayed there as guests of Lady Doris Vyner, sister to Frederick Gordon-Lennox, 9th Duke of Richmond.

During the Second World War, Fountains Hall and other estate buildings were used to house evacuees. Studley Royal became the wartime home of Queen Ethelburga's School from Harrogate and the school's sanatorium was at Fountains Hall. The stable block and courtyard was used for dormitories while one corner became the school chapel, at which Sunday Evensong was regularly said by the Archdeacon of Ripon. The hall has a balcony although it cannot be used because the staircase is considered unsafe for the public.

== Architecture ==
Fountains Hall is built of grey limestone with a stone slate roof, in a style influenced by Robert Smythson's work in the Renaissance idiom. The house has a three-bay central block of two storeys over a basement, flanked by projecting gabled wings of four storeys over a basement, with a five-storey projecting tower at each end.

== Vyner memorial ==
The Vyners lost a son and a daughter in the Second World War; Charles was a Royal Naval Volunteer Reserve pilot missing in action near Rangoon. Elizabeth was a member of the Women's Royal Naval Service and died of lethargic encephalitis while on service in Felixstowe, Suffolk. There is a stained-glass window and stone memorial remembering them, which can be seen as one comes out of the house down the stone steps. Its text, which begins with an epitaph attributed to John Maxwell Edmonds, reads:

Vyner Memorial Window in staircase

WHEN YOU GO HOME
TELL THEM OF US
AND SAY
FOR YOUR TOMORROW
WE GAVE OUR TODAY

FROM THIS THEIR HOME, THEY WENT FORTH TO WAR.
Elizabeth Vyner WRNS – Died on Active Service June 3rd 1942 Aged 18 years.
Also her brother Charles De Grey Vyner Sub Lieut (A) RNVR Reported missing
from Air Operations Off Rangoon May 2nd 1945 Aged 19 Years.

The memorial was unveiled on the evening of 9 April 1953 by Queen Elizabeth, the Queen Mother. It was designed by John Seely, 2nd Baron Mottistone and Paul Edward Paget, and made by the sculptor Cecil Thomas and the stained-glass artist Hugh Easton.

After the war the hall again fell into a state of dilapidation.

The National Trust acquired the Fountains Estate from North Yorkshire County Council in 1983 and has restored the hall. Part of it has been divided into flats, one of which is a holiday let. Visitors to Fountains Abbey can view the oak-panelled stone hall and an adjoining exhibition room, and there are plans to restore the chapel.

Balcony at Fountains Hall

== Filming location ==
Fountains Hall was the location used for the outdoor shots of Baddesley Clinton for the 1603 raid in the first episode of the 2017 BBC One miniseries Gunpowder about events surrounding the Gunpowder Plot.

Some exterior shots for the 1993 film adaptation of The Secret Garden were filmed here.

== See also ==
- Grade I listed buildings in North Yorkshire (district)
- Listed buildings in Lindrick with Studley Royal and Fountains
