= Studley Royal Park =

18th-century garden in Yorkshire, England

Studley Royal
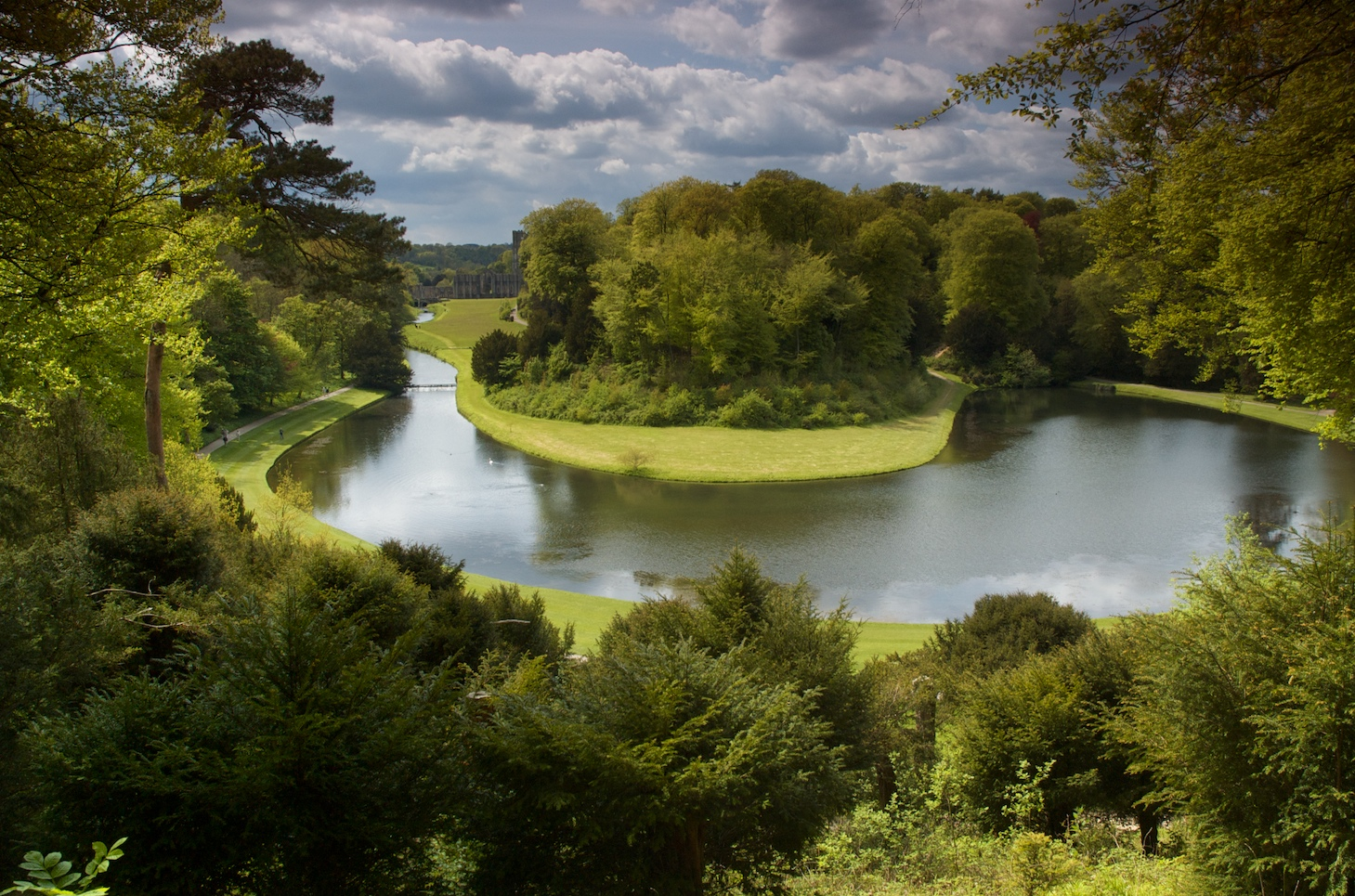
- The landscape garden from "Surprise View"

- Location within North Yorkshire Location within England
- Type: Deer park and landscape garden
- Location: North Yorkshire, England
- Coordinates: 54°06′58″N 1°34′23″W
- Website: Fountains Abbey and Studley Royal Water Garden

UNESCO World Heritage Site
- Type: Cultural
- Criteria: i, iv
- Designated: 1986 (10th session)
- Reference no.: 372
- Region: Europe and North America

National Register of Historic Parks and Gardens
- Official name: Studley Royal
- Type: Grade I
- Designated: 10 May 1984
- Reference no.: 1000410

Studley Royal Park is an estate in North Yorkshire, England. The site has an area of 800 acres (323 ha) and includes an 18th-century landscaped garden; the ruins of Fountains Abbey; Fountains Hall, a Jacobean mansion; and the Victorian St Mary's church, designed by William Burges. Studley Royal House, around which the park and gardens were designed, burned down in 1946. The park, as Studley Royal Park including the ruins of Fountains Abbey, has been designated a World Heritage Site. It has also been designated a grade I listed park and garden by Historic England, and various structures within it are individually listed.

After the Dissolution of the Monasteries, the Fountains estate was owned by the Gresham, Proctor, and Messenger families. At the same time, the adjacent Studley estate was separately held by the Mallorie (or Mallory) and then Aislabie families, after the marriage of Mary Mallory and George Aislabie. The estates were combined on 22 December 1767, when William Aislabie purchased the Fountains estate from John Messenger. In 1966, the property came into public ownership after its purchase by West Riding County Council. In 1983, it was acquired by the National Trust.

The gardens and park reflect every stage in the evolution of English garden fashion, from the late 17th century to the 1780s and beyond. Most unusually, both John and William embraced new garden fashions by extending their designed landscape rather than replacing and remaking outmoded parts. As a result, the cumulative whole is a catalogue of significant landscaping styles.

== Background ==
The River Skell runs through the estate.

Studley Royal Park is an estate in North Yorkshire, England. The land broadly slopes and east-facing views are a feature of its landscape. The River Skell runs through the site, cutting through layers of Upper Carboniferous sandstone and Permian Magnesian limestone. The park was formed through the aggregation of the former land-holdings of Fountains Abbey, which were purchased by the Gresham family after the Dissolution, and the estate of Studley Royal.

Whilst the prehistoric origins of the land upon which Studley Royal Park now stands are under-researched, there is evidence for settlement in the area. An excavated flint assemblage from the park demonstrates the presence of people working flint on the site. There is evidence of farming activity dated to 4,500 years ago.

Material from the Iron Age is also associated with the site, including a lost gold torc. Iron Age enclosures at Mackershaw date from the sixth to fifth centuries BC. In the later phases of that enclosure, Romano-British material, including an Egyptian glass bangle, has also been discovered. The presence of Romano-British communities is also attested by the excavation of four skeletons by the vicar of Wath in 1881.

Documentary sources and place-name evidence, rather than archaeological excavation, provide insight into the early medieval period in the area. The Venerable Bede recorded that King Alhfrith of Deira granted land for a monastery near Ripon to Eata.

== History ==
=== Fountains Abbey estate ===
Fountains Abbey was founded in 1132 by Benedictine monks who left St Mary's Abbey, York to follow the Cistercian order. During the medieval period, monastic landholding steadily increased. For example, in the 1220s, Cassandra de Aleman donated land at Swanley to become part of the monastic grange.

After the dissolution of the monasteries in 1539 by Henry VIII, the Abbey buildings and over 40% of the former monastic estate was sold by the Crown to Sir Richard Gresham, a merchant. The Greshams, as new owners of a formerly monastic site had a responsibility to render it incapable of future religious use. This was done through a programme of demolition and sale of goods, which included the stripping of lead from the buildings, the removal of glass and Nidderdale 'marble' from the church.

The property was passed down through several generations of Sir Richard's family, then sold to Stephen Proctor in 1596. This included the precinct, Fountains Park and Swanley Grange. It was Proctor who built Fountains Hall probably between 1598 and 1604. The hall is a Jacobean mansion, built partly with stone from the Abbey ruins. Proctor was subsequently imprisoned and sold Fountains Park to pay his legal fees. In April 1622 the Fountains estate was re-combined by Timothy Whittingham, who re-mortgaged it the same year to Humphrey Wharton. Over the subsequent two years, parts of the estate were ceded to several creditors, but ultimately Wharton regained control. The 1627 estate sale includes details for a lead casting workshop in the Warming House; the estate was bought by Richard Ewens and his son-in-law John Messenger. During the English Civil War Messenger reputedly fought at the Battles of Marston Moor and at Naseby. In 1655 Ewens' grandson, William Messenger, inherited the estate.

The Messengers were never wealthy, and in 1676 William Messenger had to arrange mortgages on the estate in order to pay for his daughters' marriages. Other financial troubles led William to leave his family, and he died in Paris in 1680, leaving his three-year-old son, John Messenger, to inherit. He married Margaret Scrope in 1698, a year after he came of age, and around this time he began re-building works on Fountain Hall. He rented out areas of the former abbey, including the mill; (Note: Fountains Abbey Mill is intact as a building, and is the oldest surviving monastic corn mill in Europe.) however these leases excluded mineral extraction, which were kept by Messenger. The family were also keenly interested in the ruins of the abbey itself, and allowed people to visit from as early as 1655.

In 1736, William's son Michael James married Elizabeth Sayer and took responsibility for the estate. He commissioned the first measured survey of the abbey in 1758. The family's financial position was declining and by 1765 Michael was selling oaks from the estate. Michael James died in 1766 and his son John Michael inherited. On 22 December 1767, John Michael sold the Fountains estate to William Aislabie for £18,000.

=== Studley estate development ===
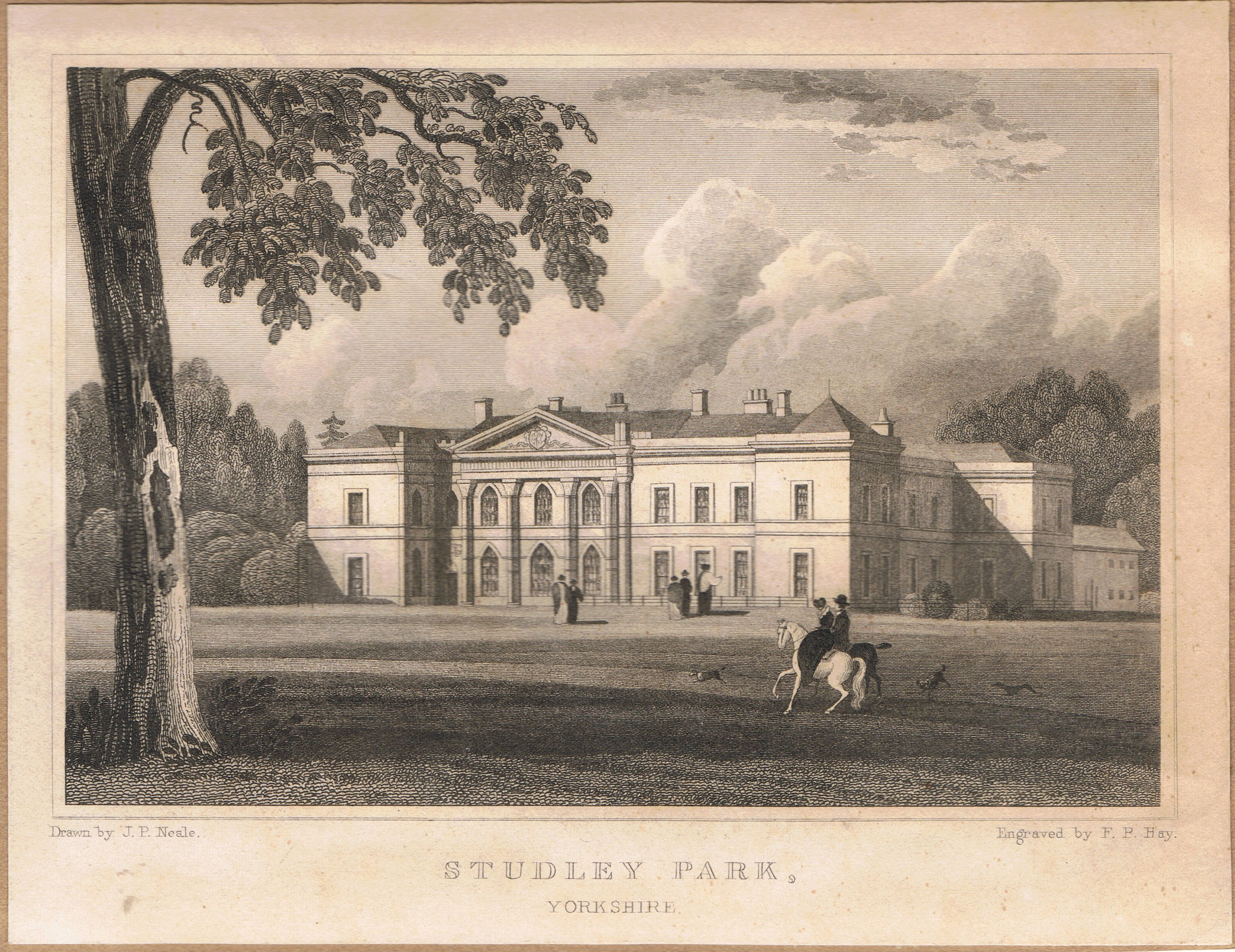
Studley Park, Yorkshire, engraved by F. P. Hay after a drawing by John Preston Neale, c. 1820

From 1452 onwards, Studley Royal was inhabited by the Mallory family, most notably by MPs John Mallory and William Mallory. A depiction of the enclosed park first appeared on Christopher Saxton's 1577 map of Yorkshire. In 1607 John Mallory commissioned the first surviving survey of the estate. This listed land-holdings and it demonstrated that the estate formerly extended beyond the park. During the English Civil War, William Mallory and his son John, were loyal to the Crown; John commanded a force that defended Skipton Castle. They only surrendered in December 1645. William died in 1646 and John was fined by Parliament for half the value of the estate. Paying off the fine was attempted by selling off his wife's family estate, as well as other property, including a mill at Galphay and a farm at Nunwick. However, despite this, when John died in January 1656, and his son William inherited, aged only eight years old, debts had mounted up to £10,000. During this time it was John's widow, Mary, who managed the estate and managed to bring it within its means once more. However, in 1667, William died aged nineteen and the estate passed to his sisters: the eldest Mary, who was married to George Aislabie, as well as Jane and Elizabeth.

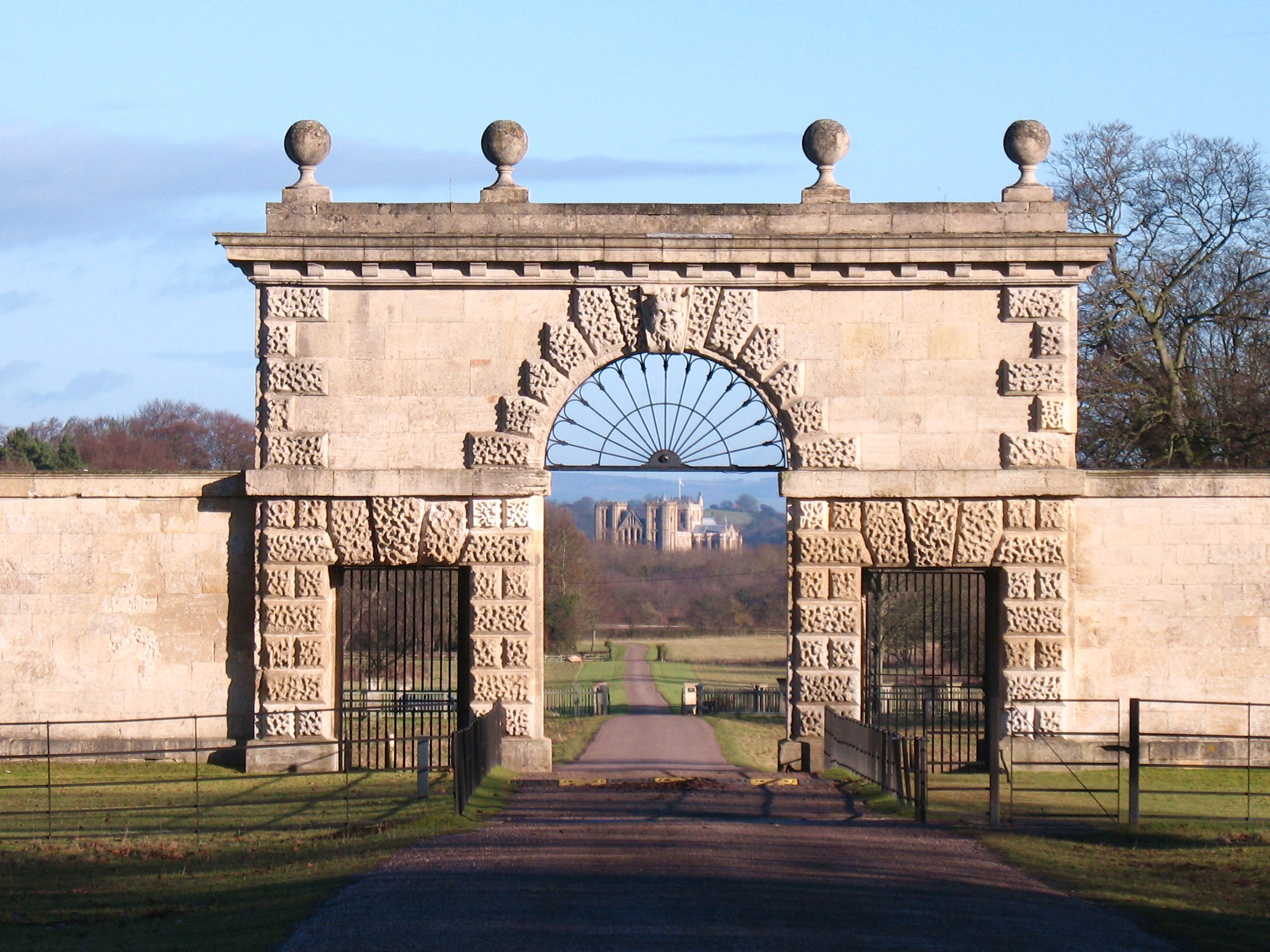
Great Gate, or East Gate, Studley Royal

Aislabie was the son of a farmer from Osgodby in North Yorkshire. He worked as a clerk for William Turbutt in the church courts at York. As part of Turbutt's household, Aislabie inherited £200 at his death in November 1648. After Turbutt's death Aislabie remained as part of the household, working for the widowed Elizabeth Turbutt. There is a suggestion made by John Richard Walbran that the pair may have had a romantic attachment, but this is unproven. Nevertheless he was the primary beneficiary of Turbutt's will when she died in 1662 – a result of which he purchased Treasurer's House in York. It was around this time that he married Mary Mallorie. George was killed in a duel in 1676. It was George who began plans for the re-establishment of an enlarged park with Studley Royal in its centre. Studley Great Gate, now more commonly known as East Gate, the largest probable remnant of his plans.

George Aislabie's wife, Mary, preserved the estate, but by the time of her death in 1683 was in debt. Trustees to the estate were appointed until the heir, Mallorie Aislabie, came of age: William Robinson, husband of the eldest daughter Mary and Arthur Ingram. Mallorie died in 1685 and was succeeded as heir by his brother George, who inherited but then died in 1693. The third brother, John Aislabie inherited the Studley estate. A survey in 1694 describes both an 'old park' and a 'new park' which invites consideration of expansion under his father.

By 1695 John Aislabie was the Tory Member of Parliament for Ripon, and in 1718 became Chancellor of the Exchequer. This enabled some of the family's perhaps long held plans, to landscape the park, to begin. This included the construction of a tower on How Hill, and the canal and cascade that became the foundation of the Water Garden. Aislabie was a principal sponsor of the South Sea Company scheme, the bill for which was promoted by him personally. In 1720 this vast financial operation collapsed, and in 1721 he was expelled from Parliament and disqualified for life from public office. Stocks from the South Sea Company were grafted to the East India Company, of which his brother William was a director.

=== Development of the gardens ===
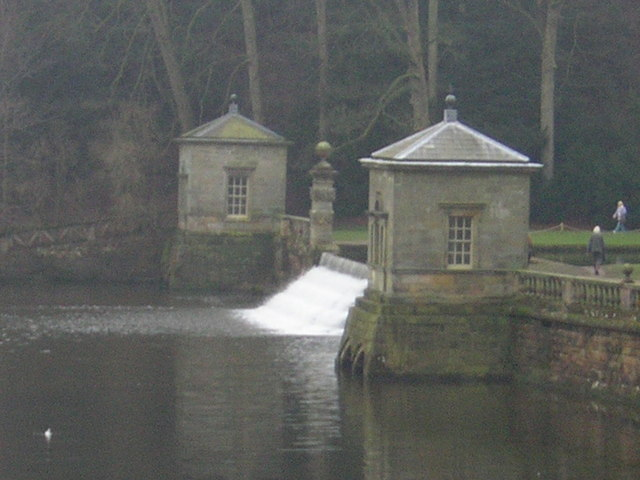
Fishing lodges and cascade

Aislabie returned to Yorkshire and from 1723 devoted himself to the landscaping of the estate. This included the construction of a boundary wall along the western side of the valley between the Fountains Abbey and Studley Royal estates. This wall had at least one viewing platform and connected to the path known as High Walk. Boundaries including ha-has were also constructed at this time. It is possible the design was influenced by his kinsman William Benson's knowledge of neo-Palladian design. Other early features included The Upper Canal and Drum Falls. Flooding subsequently damaged these early developments, and by 1726 approximately 100 men were working to create water features, which included canals and ponds. The design of the cascade and the fishing lodges is attributed to Roger Morris, who worked with Colen Campbell. The cascade and the canal was described in 1729 by Stephen Switzer in his volume of engineering, Hydrostatics. Aislabie and Morris's works did not just extend to the water gardens, but also to other areas of the estate. By 1728 work was also underway on the High Stables, which can still be seen in the deer park.

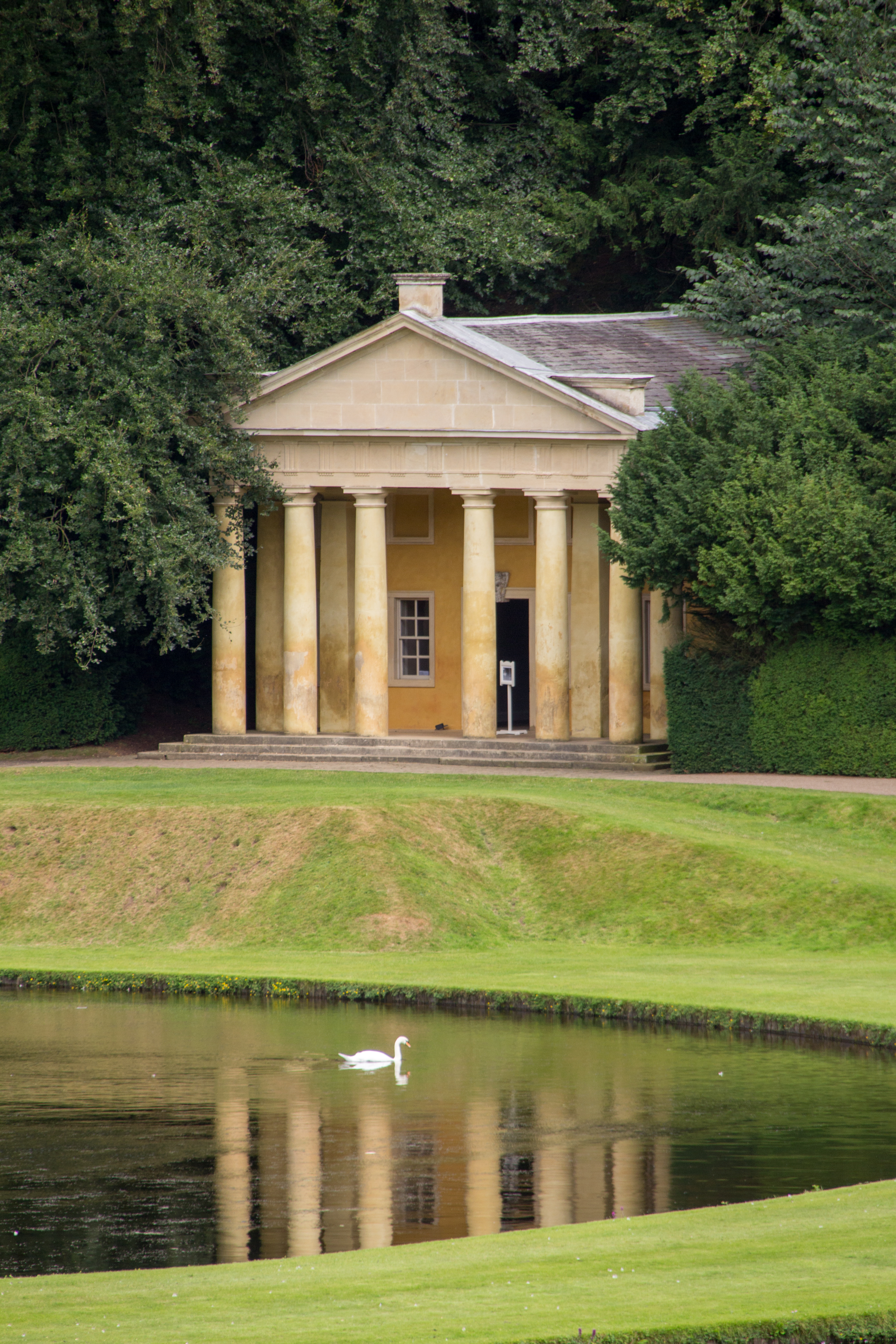
Temple of Piety, 2016

During the 1730s and 1740s, there were a number of head gardeners employed by Aislabie. William Fisher worked on the estate from at least 1717 to 1732, when he was paid off. He was followed by John Hossack (left 1738), Mathias Mitchell (dismissed 1742) and then James Lockey (died 1744). Another significant employee was Robert Doe, who was a builder, mason and later head gardener too. Doe later worked on building projects for Castle Howard and for Swinton Castle. This was also a period of expansion, during which Aislabie changed the lease on Mackershaw – making it permanent, rather than leased for agriculture. During this phase, the Grotto was constructed and changes were made to footpaths around its location; the Temple of Piety was also built.

In 1738 the first known plan of the gardens was made by Sir John Clerk, 2nd Baronet of Penicuik, who was visiting them as part of a northern tour. At the same time the Octagon Tower was also constructed and it was glazed and decorated during 1735; subsequently stuccowork was added by Francesco Vassalli. Other buildings constructed at this time include the Bathing House and the Boathouse. The planting at this time was perhaps sparser than that of the estate in the early twenty-first century: eighteenth-century visitors reported seeing bare rock between the trees. The late 1730s also saw a revision of the statuary scheme in the gardens, which included the introduction of a statue of Neptune, centrally located in the Moon Pond.

After Aislabie's death on 18 June 1742, his son William inherited, and whilst little is known about William's life, it is known that he set out on a Grand Tour in 1720, which was thwarted by political turmoil in France. In 1724 he married Lady Elizabeth Cecil, with whom he had six children: two sons and four daughters. Elizabeth and two of their daughters died in a smallpox outbreak in 1733. William's first scheme for the gardens was the construction of a funerary pyramid, modelled on the one at Stowe Gardens. He also extended the designed landscape further down the Skell Valley and introduced in 1745 a 'Chinese house', inspired by fashion at the time.

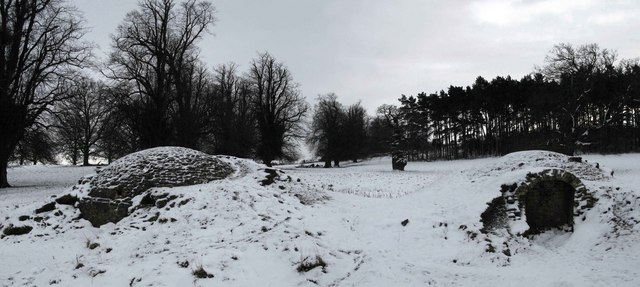
Ice houses

In 1745 William re-married, to Elizabeth Vernon, who was the niece of his step-mother. Perhaps, as a result, Studley Hall was renovated, which included the decoration of two rooms in a chinoiserie style. In the 1750s a gardeners house was built near the Kitchen Garden and two ice houses were constructed. A private garden with aviary was also created next to Studley Hall during this period. William also added new architectural features to the park: an obelisk at the western end of the main avenue and the Belvedere, which was a Gothic garden room. In addition to new buildings, existing ones had a change of character: for example the Temple of Venus had family portraits installed in it and its name changes to that of 'Banqueting House'. In the 1750s the network of footpaths around the gardens were also much greater than the modern-day lay-out. Overall, William extended the landscaped area in the picturesque romantic style, contrasting with the formality of his father's work. Between them, the two created what is arguably England's most important 18th-century landscape gardens.

=== Combined estates ===
On 22 December 1767, William Aislabie purchased the Fountains estate from John Messenger, combining the Studley and Fountains estates.

In February 1768, the gardens were flooded, which resulted in repairs and renovations. Subsequently, the reservoir was expanded from a two-acre, to a three-and-a-half-acre capacity. This period also included the insertion of new garden buildings, such as the Green Arch and the White Seat. In addition, new water features were added to the south-east of the gardens. 1768 also saw Robert Doe, on the instruction of Aislabie, begin to clear and stabilise the abbey ruins; work which continued until at least 1773. Part of this scheme of work included the demolition of the Lay Brothers' Cloister. It also included construction: the Gazebo was built under the east Window, which provided visitors with an elevated view of the nave.

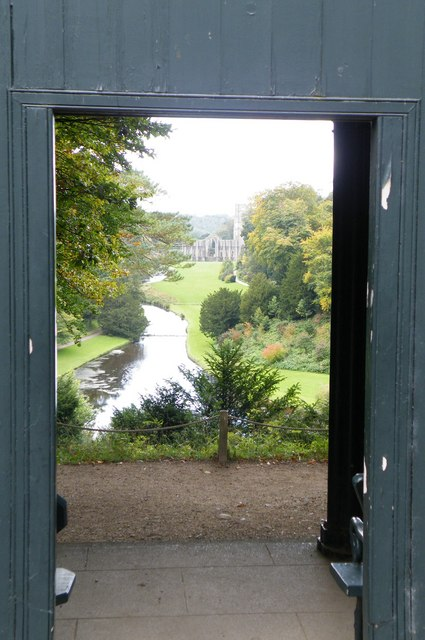
Studley Royal – The Surprise View Through The Door Of Anne Boleyn's Seat

Anne Boleyn's Hill is first named as part of the gardens in 1771, where an antiquarian headless statue looked out on the valley. The statue moved and was restored to its location in 2004. The last mention of the Rotondo and the Coffin Lawn dates to 1775, and it is likely the former was used to infill the latter. The canalisation of the Skell near the Abbey was undertaken in 1773, which used the river as a framing device for the view of the abbey from Anne Boleyn's Seat (constructed c. 1789–91).

William also added ornamentation to parts of the ruins, adding detailing, but most significantly recreating the location of the high altar through the repositioning of medieval tiles found throughout the site. He also added planting to the cloister, in the form of shrubs and flowers. Greater security was also introduced to the abbey, with lockable doors and gates. However, there was contemporary criticism of these changes, in particular from William Gilpin, who visited Studley on a tour of the north of England.

William died on 17 May 1781 in London. The estate passed to his elder daughter, Elizabeth Allanson, after his two sons predeceased him. Whilst she spent the majority of her time as owner at her home in Twickenham, Elizabeth did continue her family's civic work in Ripon – donating to the poor, funding streetlighting and building Ripon Town Hall. However, although she appointed Christopher Hall as agent, during her ownership, and her lack of presence at the estate, many areas of the designed landscape became neglected.

Elizabeth died on 8 March 1808 and was succeeded by her niece, Elizabeth Sophia Lawrence, who lived at Studley from 1808 until her death in 1845. An influential woman in the area, she used her position to influence (and punish) voters. Under her ownership, she made further additions to the grounds, which included The Obelisk, as well as Robin Hood's Well, which enclosed a small spring. She also made repairs to the abbey, including to Huby's Tower. It was under her ownership that John Richard Walbran first undertook excavations in 1840. In her will she left bequests totalling £237,000, including £1000 to fund a dispensary in Ripon.

The estate then devolved to Thomas Philip, 2nd Earl de Grey, a distant relative. Under de Grey, Walbran undertook further excavation. These excavations in the 1850s also piqued public interest further in the site. This was furthered by the opening of curative springs nearby in Harrogate bringing a large tourism audience with it. Management of the huge increases in the numbers of tourists entailed the creation of new routes, including the De Grey Walk and the Well Walk. In 1847 a new one shilling entrance fee was introduced. The first record of a school trip to the site was from St Peter's School, Dallowgill, in September 1851. In 1858 the first museum for the site was opened in the Muniments Room, above the Warming House. The 1850s also saw major events held at the estate for the first time. These raised funds for a variety of causes, such as the Ripon Mechanics Institute, to celebrate peace in Crimea, and a 'Great Musical Celebration' in 1868. In 1869 the third-earliest bicycle race to be held in England ran through the estate.

On de Grey's death in 1859, the estate passed to his nephew, George Robinson, 1st Marquess of Ripon, and later the Viceroy of India. He redeveloped areas of Studley Hall, as well as renovating the gardens near the house. He also constructed the Pheasantry at the edge of the estate, as well as building a golf course, whose first professional was Harry Vardon. He also built St Mary's church in the park. During his ownership of the estate, three structures were added: Studley tea room, an oval island in the lake, and the High Seat in the west of the gardens. During this period, more exotic trees were introduced as part of the planting scheme – for example, a Wellingtonia gigantea was planted by the Prince of Wales in 1863. In 1886 a pageant was held on the estate, celebrating Ripon's millennium; a similar event was repeated in 1896 for the Diamond Jubilee of Queen Victoria.

The 1st Marquess of Ripon died in 1909 and his son Frederick Oliver inherited the estate. On the death of Frederick Robinson, 2nd Marquess of Ripon in 1923, the estate was acquired by his cousin Clare George Vyner. Visitor income became more significant for the Vyner family than it had been for the Robinsons, yet the family had a strong sense of social responsibility and in the 1930s established the Fountains Abbey Settlers Society, which provided work and skills to unemployed families. This also included a work scheme that dredged the river. In addition to the scheme on the estate, Vyner also funded the construction of a model village in Swarland, Northumberland. The Settlers Society ended at the outbreak of the Second World War, but its accommodation was repurposed to house German and Polish refugees. During the war much of the estate's land was cultivated for the first time in 600 years, as part of the 'Dig For Victory' campaign. Studley Hall after doing war service as the home of Queen Ethelburga's School, was destroyed by fire in April 1946. After the war, the upkeep of the estate became too expensive for the Vyner family, who sold it to Broadlands Properties for £1,250,000. They subsequently also sold Fountains Hall to West Riding County Council in 1969.

=== Public ownership ===
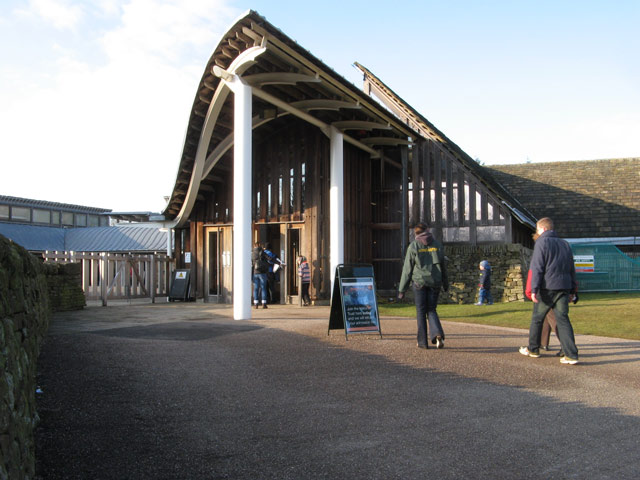
Visitor centre

In 1966 much of the estate was purchased by West Riding County Council from Broadlands Properties, and the property was reopened to the public in 1967. However, resource pressures meant that the local authority was keen to find another owner for the estate. There had been previous appeals to the National Trust to undertake running the site, including in 1923. In 1983 the property was acquired by the National Trust. The National Trust's 1983 acquisition did not include the separately owned freehold shooting rights, which were sold separately in 1966 and are now owned by Studley Royal Shoot.

English Heritage is responsible for the conservation of the abbey under a guardianship agreement, but managed on a day-to-day basis by the National Trust. St Mary’s Church is owned by the State and managed by the National Trust under a local management agreement. In 1986 the entire estate was designated a World Heritage Site by UNESCO. It gained recognition as it fulfils the criteria of “being a masterpiece of human creative genius, and an outstanding example of a type of building or architectural or technological ensemble or landscape which illustrates significant stages in human history”. The initial proposal for World Heritage Status only extended to Fountains Abbey and St Mary's Church; it was on the recommendation of the International Council on Monuments and Sites (ICOMOS) that the listing extended to include Studley Royal. In 1992, a new visitor centre and car parks were designed by Ted Cullinan to accommodate growing visitor numbers. Lying north-west of the Abbey above the valley floor, the new visitor centre incorporated a shop, large restaurant, lecture theatre and exhibition space (currently office space) arranged around an open courtyard.

In 2015 stage designer Gary McCann was commissioned to produce work in response to the buildings on the property; the resulting exhibition, entitled Folly!, installed works in spaces such as the Banqueting House. In 2016, Mat Collishaw created Seria Ludo and The Pineal Eye in the Temple of Piety. In 2018, Charles Holland, Lucy Orta and Flea Folly Architects created artworks to reimagine lost follies in the landscape. In 2021, Steve Messam created three artworks in an exhibition entitled These Passing Things and in 2022 Joe Cornish created a photographic exhibition Still Time to Wonder in various buildings on the property.

=== Significance ===
Studley Royal, under National Trust ownership, is the preserved core of a once much more substantial Aislabie project, which incorporated the surrounding agrarian landscape that they owned, long-distance views to Ripon and beyond, and rides extending to other designed landscapes including Laver Banks and Hackfall (seven miles from Studley).^{:171, 177–184} The gardens and park reflect every stage in the evolution of English garden fashion, from the late seventeenth-century to the 1780s and beyond. Most unusually both John and William embraced new garden fashions by extending their designed landscape rather than replacing and remaking outmoded parts.^{:333} As a result, the cumulative whole is a catalogue of significant landscaping styles. This includes John Aislabie's ground-breaking appreciation of natural topographical landforms, for him it was not necessary to level ground and create a garden, the garden could be made to accommodate and display the underlying landscape.^{:231}

== Major features ==
The park incorporates Fountains Abbey, Fountains Hall, and several other notable historic features.

=== Studley Royal Water Garden ===
The Lake, from Temple of Piety, Studley Park, Yorkshire. Published 21 June 1866.

The water garden at Studley Royal created by John Aislabie in 1718 is one of the best surviving examples of a Georgian water garden in England. It was expanded by his son, William who purchased the adjacent Fountains Estate. The garden's elegant ornamental lakes, canals, temples and cascades provide a succession of dramatic eye-catching vistas. It is also studded with a number of follies including a neo-Gothic tower and a palladian-style banqueting house.

The grade I-listed canal is about 500 metres (1,600 ft) long and 10 metres (33 ft) wide, and is angled near the weir called Drum Falls. It has gritstone walls and a puddled clay base. On the east side is a segmental arch covering a sluice outlet. The weir at its north end is grade II* listed along with its piers, pavilions and balustrades. The weir is built of gritstone and has a cascade of four steps. It is flanked by the piers with bands of frosted rustication and ball finials. Outside these are the balustraded walls leading to fishing pavilions over double-arched sluices. Each pavilion has a Venetian window, a moulded eaves cornice, and a pyramidal roof with a ball finial and a weathervane. Each revetment wall has a stone mask and a water spout with a stone basin.

The Half-Moon Pond is grade II* listed, as are the Moon and Crescent Ponds. They have stone walls and are lined in clay. The Moon Pond is a circular with a submerged causeway, and it is flanked by the crescent-shaped ponds. The Half-Moon Pond has parallel semicircular sides joined by straight sides.

=== St Mary's Church ===
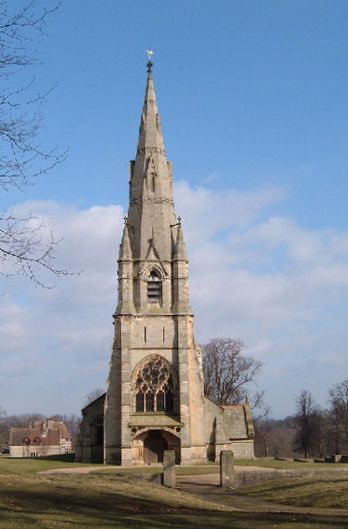
View of the West End of the church

St Mary's Church was built by the architect William Burges and commissioned by the family of the 1st Marquess of Ripon. It has been suggested that the construction of this place of worship was prompted by the death of Frederick Grantham Vyner, who was kidnapped and killed in Greece in 1870.

Burges' appointment as architect was most likely due to the connection between his greatest patron, John Crichton-Stuart, 3rd Marquess of Bute and Vyner, who had been friends at Oxford. St Mary's, on Lady Ripon's estate at Studley Royal, was commissioned in 1870 and work began in 1871. The church was consecrated in 1878. As at Skelton, Burges' design demonstrates a move from his favoured Early-French, to an English style. Nikolaus Pevsner writes of "a Victorian shrine, a dream of Early English glory." The interior is spectacular, exceeding Skelton in richness and majesty. The stained glass is of particularly high quality. St Mary's is Burges' "ecclesiastical masterpiece."

Both marquesses and their wives are buried there.

=== How Hill Tower ===
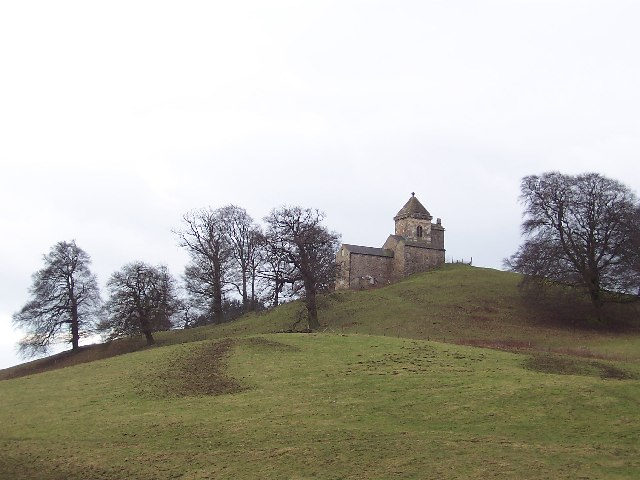
How Hill Tower

Prior to 1346, a chapel dedicated to St Michael the Archangel was built on How Hill. This became a minor medieval pilgrimage site.^{:28} Post-reformation the chapel continued to be used between 1551–54 for the churching of women, until falling into ruin.^{:42} A tower was constructed next to the ruins, and reusing some of their masonry.^{:83–85}

=== Deer park ===
The deer park, where the church stands, is home to deer, and a wealth of other flora and fauna. At Studley there are three types of deer: Red Deer, Fallow Deer and Sika Deer. John Clerk, visiting in 1738, described how the buck deer moved in a group, so that they "resemble a moving forrest [sic]".

== Buildings and structures ==
=== Studley Royal House ===
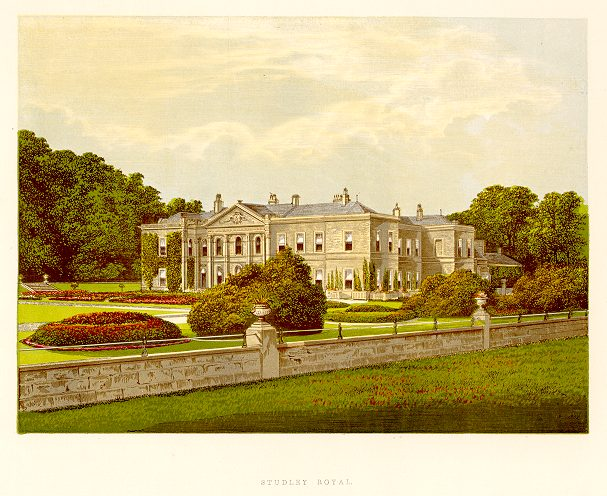
Studley Royal House in 1880

Studley Royal House (or Hall) stood in the north-west corner of the park. Originally a medieval manor house, there is a record from the 1220s of an extensive garden created by Cassandra de Aleman.^{:33} It consisted of a main block with forward projecting wings, it burned down in 1716 and was rebuilt by John Aislabie. He filled in the centre, to which his son William added a portico in 1762 to complete its Palladian appearance.

It was altered and developed by the 1st Marquess of Ripon, who created a new entrance hall, a royal suite, and the reorganisation of the domestic service areas. He also added a Catholic chapel at the western side of the house in 1878.

The house burnt down in 1946, and its remains were demolished by the Vyner family, who could not afford repairs to it. Instead, the splendid Georgian stable block, built for John Aislabie’s racehorses between 1728 and 1732, was converted into an elegant Palladian country house. It has adoped the name Studley Royal House and is set in 2½ acres of private formal gardens on high ground overlooking the deer park towards Ripon Cathedral in the distance.

Built of stone under a slate roof with distinctive pavilion towers in each of the four corners, the pristine, 11,708sq ft house surrounds a central square courtyard overlooked by all the main rooms and dominated by the working clock tower.

=== Studley Magna ===
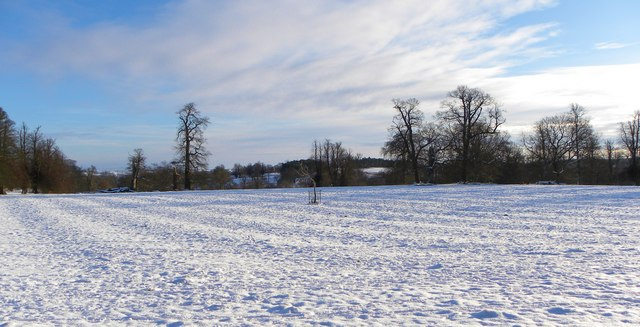
Ridge and furrow in Studley Park – likely associated with Studley Magna

The deserted medieval village of Studley Magna mainly lies within the boundaries of the park. Excavation demonstrated that the village was aligned with the important road to Aldfield. The earliest ceramics from the site date to c.1180–1220, whilst the latest finds date from c.1300. The site included a large two-storey miller's house with a stone fireplace that was rare for the period. The house was sold in 1362 by Widow Horner to Richard Tempest.^{:30–32}

=== The Banqueting House ===
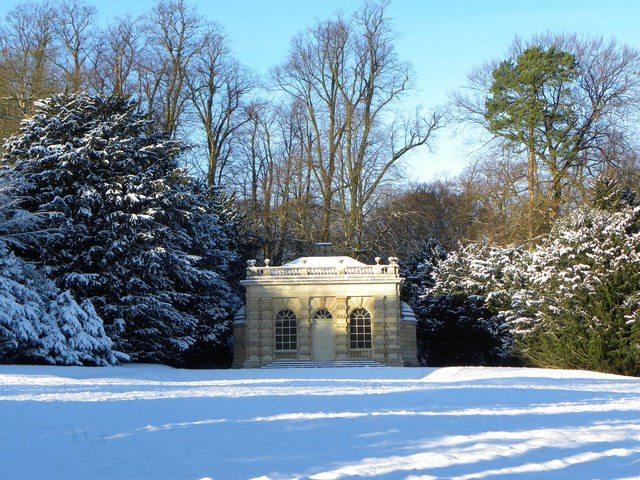
Banqueting House

Documentary evidence suggests that the Banqueting House was being completed in 1731, and is described in the estate accounts as 'the new building'. The structure had several phases of alteration after construction, and other documents refer to it as 'the Greenhouse'. In front of the façade a deep coffin-shaped lawn was introduced, who sightlines connected the building and the Rotondo. Above the Banqueting House, amongst the trees, is an oval platform, which is likely to be the Dial Lawn, which is described in accounts in 1730s. It is a grade I listed building.

The building is constructed of stone with a hipped Westmorland slate roof, one storey and three bays. In the centre is a doorway with a round-arched fanlight, flanked by round-arched sash windows. Each opening has rusticated voussoirs, and a keystone with a mask, and under each window is a balustrade. Six pilasters with banded rustication carry a cornice and a balustraded parapet with ball finials. On the sides are rusticated apsidal projections with domed roofs.

=== The Temple of Piety ===
The building was constructed based on a sketch by Andrea Palladio owned by Richard Boyle, 3rd Earl of Burlington, and was initially known as the Temple of Hercules. Documentary evidence shows that it was constructed and named by April 1736. It is also grade I listed.

The temple is in rendered brick and stone, and has a Westmorland slate roof with lead verges. On the front is a portico of six Roman Doric columns on a gritstone pavement, with an entablature, a pediment and a pedestal. The central doorway has an architrave with a mask keystone, and is flanked by pairs of windows in architraves. In each of the returns is a doorway in an eared surround with a triple keystone.

=== Mackershaw Lodges ===
These buildings were constructed after 1731, with the change in terms of the loan (to acquisition) of the Mackershaw area. They compromise two small lodges with classical pediments either side of a central arch, constructed from rough, undressed stone, with Venetian windows. The gateway and flanking lodges are in limestone, and are in ruins. The central round-arched gateway has massive voussoirs and a keystone, and is flanked by flat-headed pedestrian gateways, over which are round-arched recesses. Above these is a modillion eaves cornice, and three bases for statues. The flanking lodges each has a Venetian window with an impost band, a modillion eaves cornice and a pediment. The structure is listed at grade II.

=== Lost buildings ===
==== Wattle Hall ====
One of the buildings most frequently attested in the early eighteenth-century is the Wattle Hall. Surviving records suggest that it was made of bent branches rather than brick or stone, and it was repaired in 1732.

==== Rotondo ====
Close to Kendall's Walk and in the north-east corner of Coffin Lawn, evidence for the Rotondo first appears in a painting dating to 1734–41. It was demolished in the 1770s. A close comparison to this would have been the Temple of Venus in Stowe Gardens.

==== Pyramid ====
William's first building work for the gardens was ordering the construction of a funerary pyramid, modelled on the one at Stowe Gardens. Whilst designs for this building exist, its location is unknown. It is possible that the stone was cut, but it was never constructed.

==== Chinese house ====
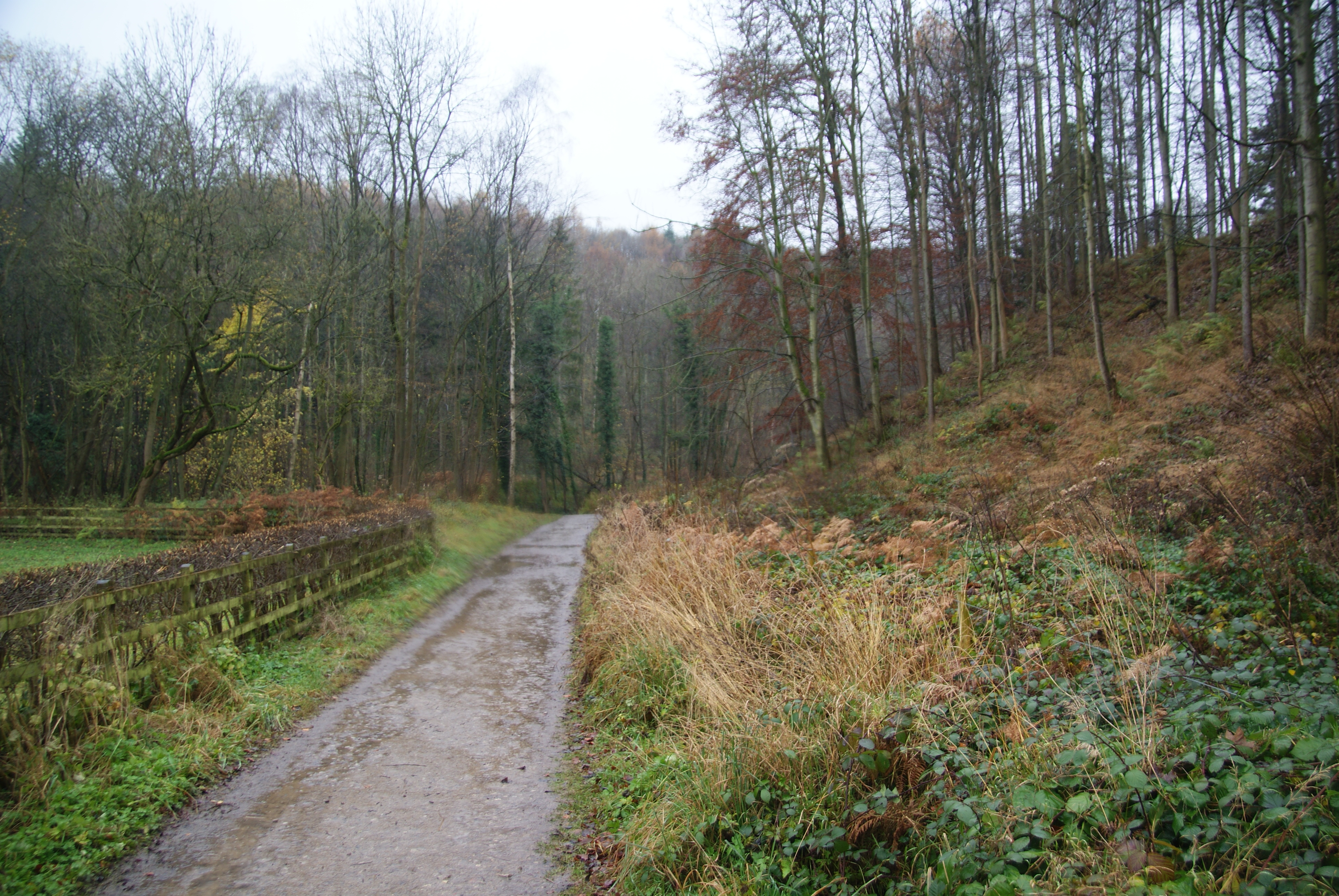
Bridleway into Chinese Wood

The Chinese house was constructed in 1745 and a 1751 visitor described it as having blue columns, gilded decoration, a white ceiling, a variety of Chinese ornaments and stuccowork by Giuseppe Cortese. It also had a balustrade seat running inside the columns. There is a surviving sketch of the building, but only the plinth for its survives. It was located beyond the southern limit of National Trust estate. The area around the house was known as the Chinese Wood, to which two chinoiserie-style bridges provided access.

== See also ==
- Listed buildings in Lindrick with Studley Royal and Fountains

== Image gallery ==
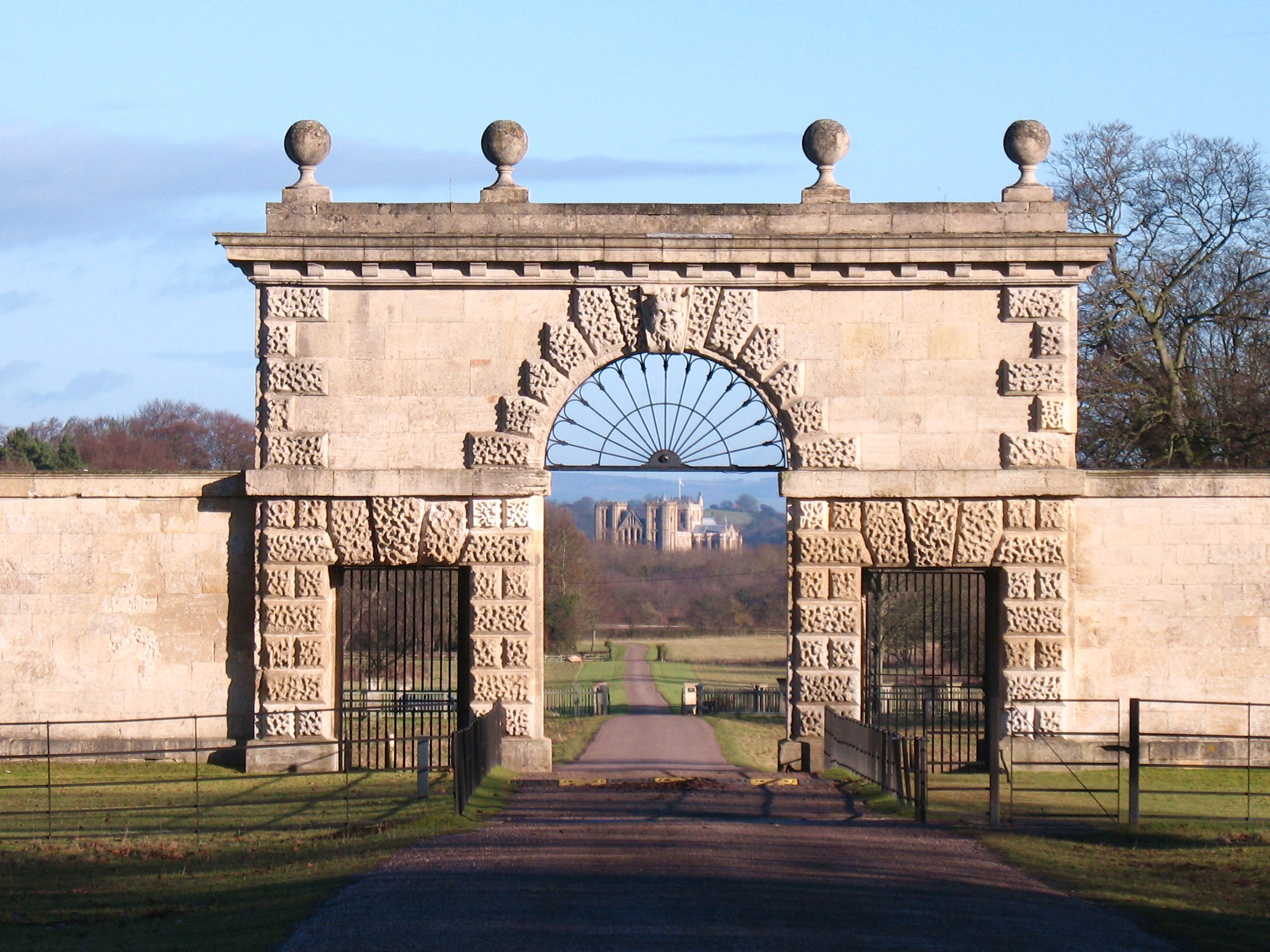
Main entrance to park

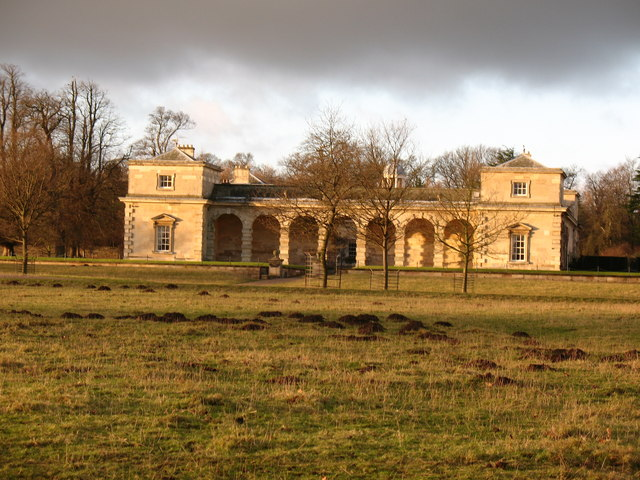
Stable block, now converted to a private house

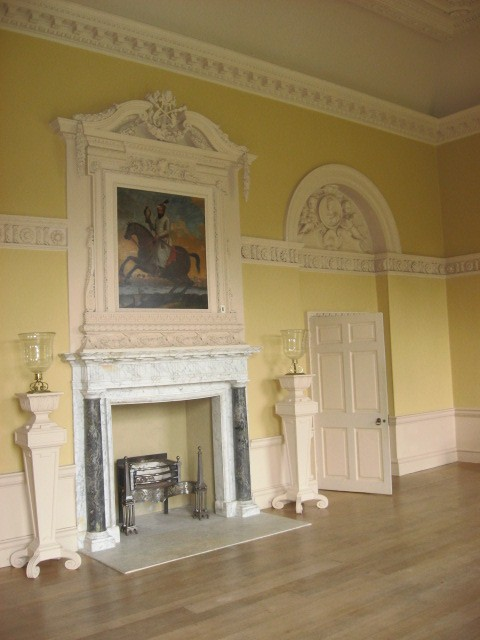
Interior of banqueting house

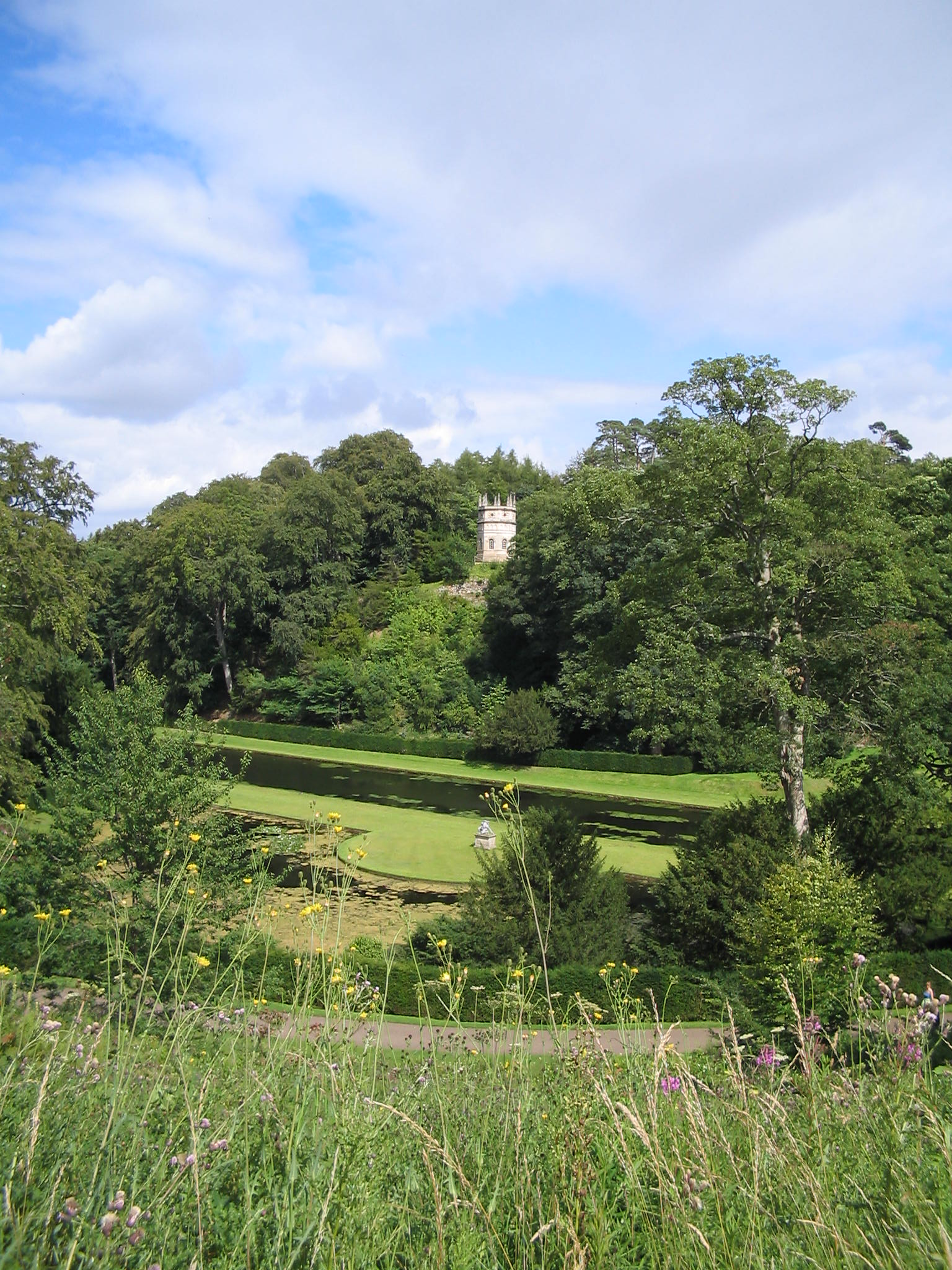
View of the water garden showing the Gothic folly of the Octagonal Tower

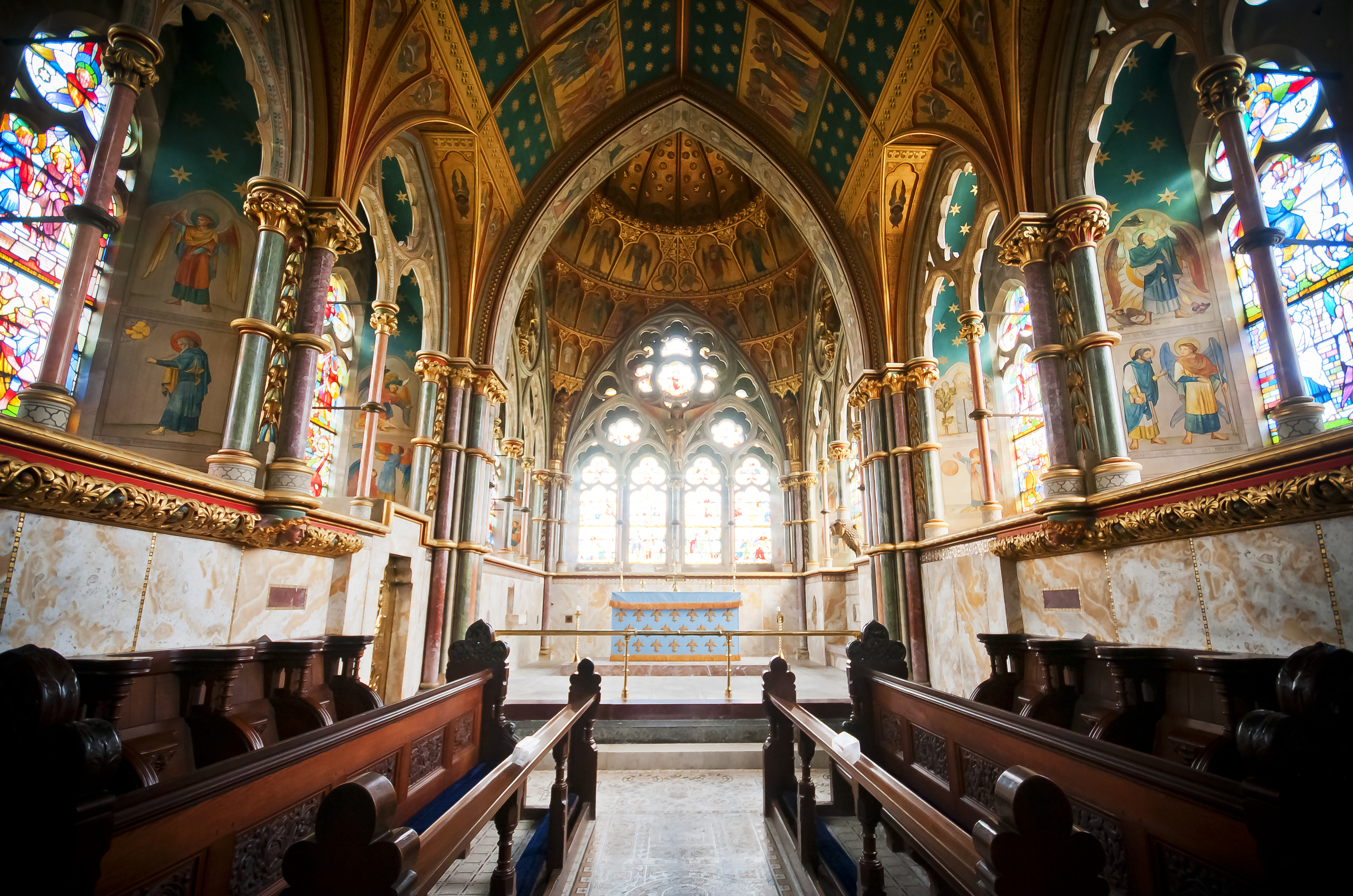
Chancel of St Mary's Church

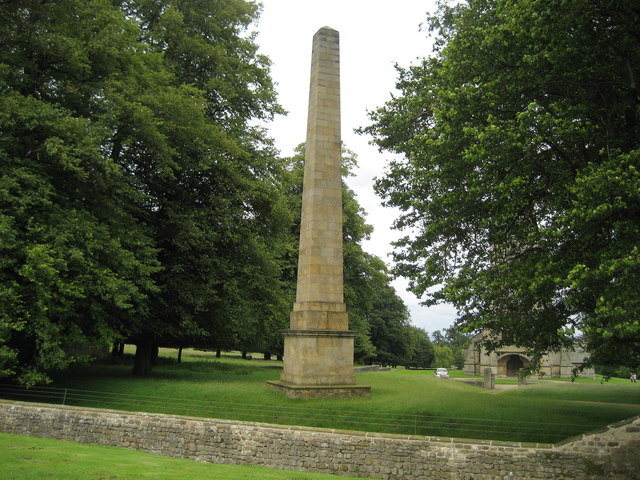
The Obelisk Above St Mary's Church

Octagon Tower

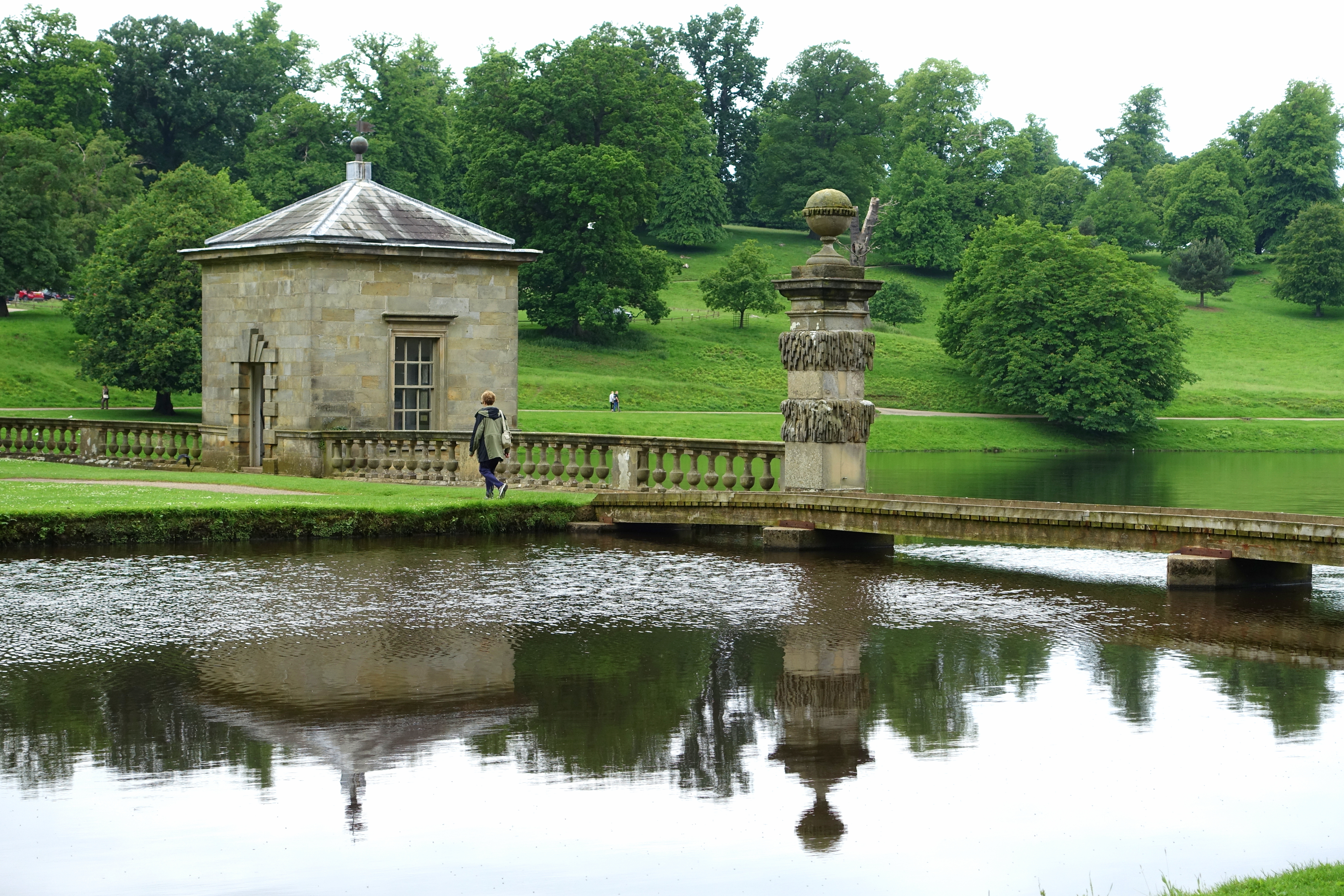
One of the fishing pavilions and weir

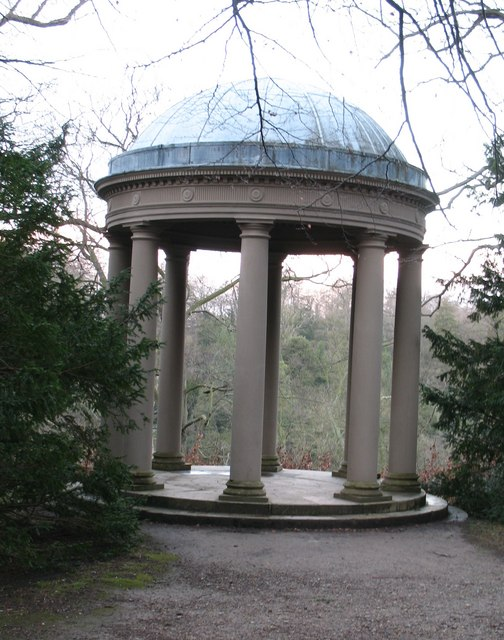
Temple of Fame

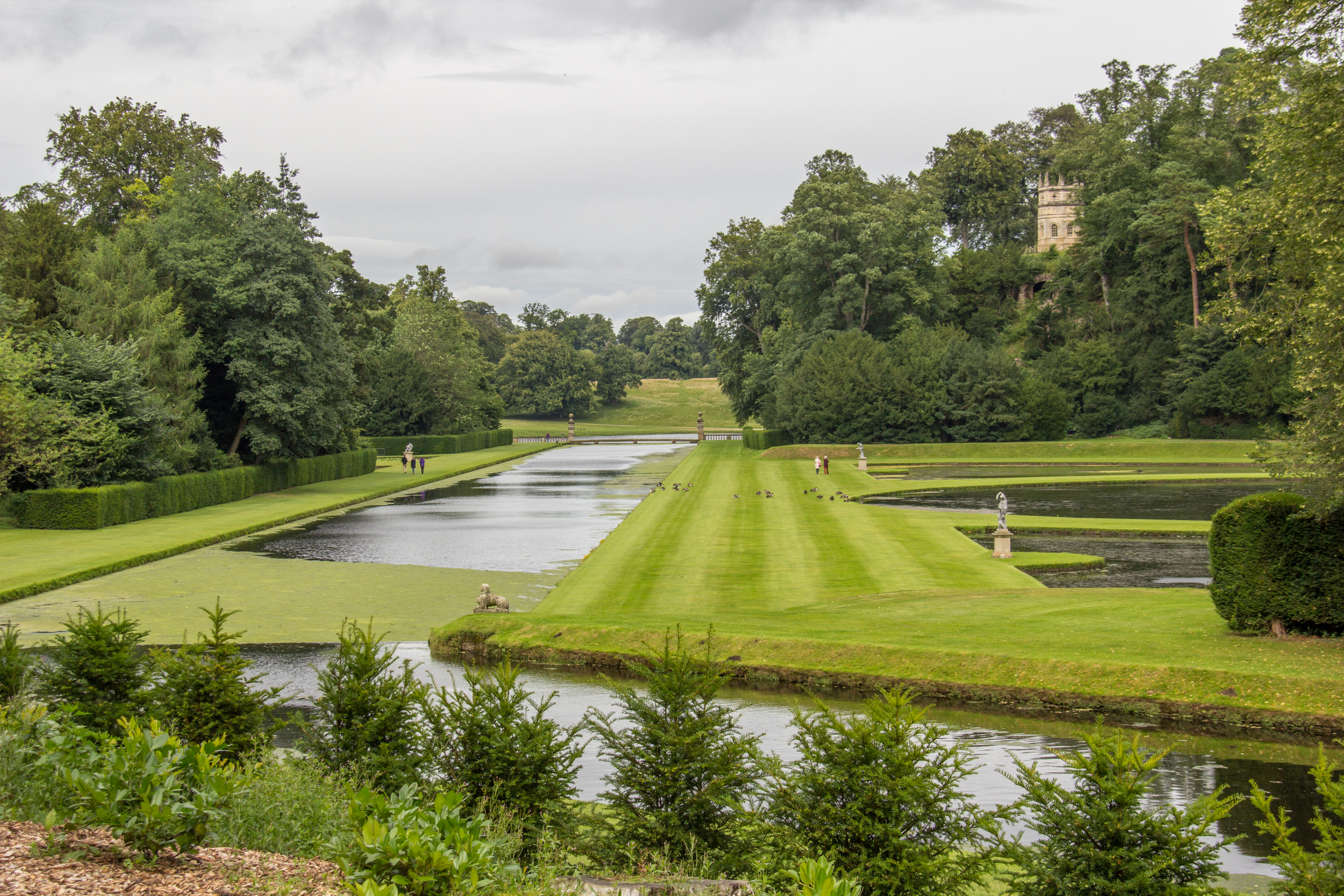
View across the Water Gardens

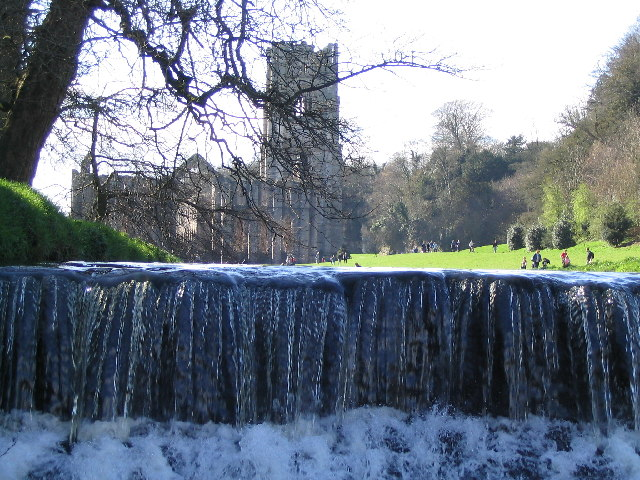
Cascade

Moon pond and the Temple of Piety

The Wrestlers by Andrew Carpenter

Hercules and Antaeus by Andrew Carpenter
