= Abbeydorney Abbey =

Ruined Cistercian abbey in Kerry, Ireland

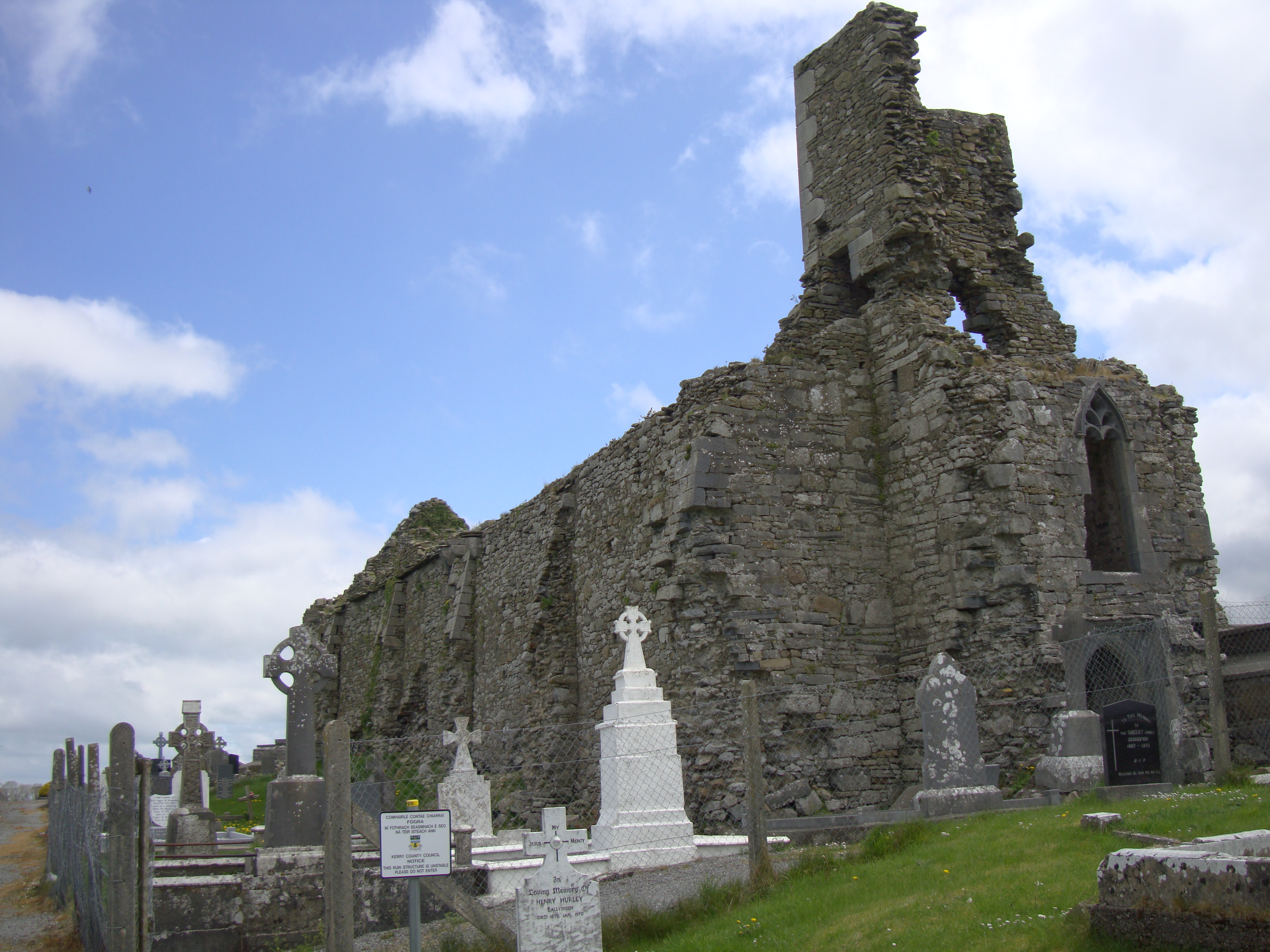
- The abbey in May 2010

- Location within Ireland

Monastery information
- Other name: Kyrie Eleison Odorney
- Order: Cistercian
- Established: 1154
- Disestablished: 1537
- Mother house: Monasteranenagh Abbey
- Diocese: Limerick

People
- Founder: O'Torneys
- Important associated figures: Christian O'Conarchy the first abbott of Mellifont buried here

Site
- Location: Montanagay, Abbeydorney, Co. Kerry
- Coordinates: 52°21′12″N 9°41′14″W
- Visible remains: 15th century abbey church with west tower and some of the claustral buildings. The grounds are largely occupied by gravestones and are currently in use as a cemetery.
- Public access: Yes (Discover Ireland)

Abbeydorney Abbey, also known as Kyrie Eleison Abbey or Odorney, was founded by the O Torna, chieftain of the region, in 1154 for the Cistercians from Monasteranenagh.

The abbey was the daughter-house of Monasteranenagh in County Limerick, and was the only medieval Cistercian house in County Kerry.

The name given by the Cistercians, Kyrie Eleison (from Greek: Lord Have Mercy) was in accordance with the order's tradition of giving names which reflected the locality - in this instance the word Kyrie (Lord) being similar to Ciarrai (County Kerry).

Christian O'Conarchy the first abbot of Mellifont retired to the abbey where he spent his remaining years, and was buried here in 1186.

A subsequent abbot was deposed in 1227 after being involved in the Conspiracy of Mellifont.

The foundation was dissolved in 1537.

The remains visible today include the 15th century abbey church with west tower and some of the claustral buildings. The grounds are largely occupied by gravestones and are currently in use as a cemetery.

== See also ==
- List of Cistercian abbeys in Ireland
- List of abbeys and priories in Ireland (County Kerry)
- Abbeydorney
