= List of Cistercian abbeys in Ireland =

List of Cistercian Abbeys in Ireland
- (Sacer) Ordo Cisterciensis
- Coat of arms of the Cistercians

This is a List of Cistercian monasteries (called abbeys) in Ireland. The first abbey built in Ireland was Mellifont Abbey, founded by Saint Malachy, Archbishop of Armagh in 1142.

== Currently active abbeys ==
- Mount St. Joseph Abbey, Roscrea, Republic of Ireland (Trappist)
- Mount Melleray Abbey, Knockmealdown mountains in County Waterford, Republic of Ireland. Now Vacated
- Portglenone Abbey Church, County Antrim, Northern Ireland (Trappist)
- Bolton Abbey, Moone, County Kildare, Republic of Ireland (Trappist)
- St. Mary's Abbey, Glencairn, County Waterford, Republic of Ireland (Trappist); the only Cistercian Abbey for women in Ireland

== Abbeys, now in ruins ==
Given in brackets are the date of foundation and the motherhouse which established the Abbey.

- Abbeydorney Abbey, County Kerry (1154 Monasteranenagh)
- Abbeyfeale Abbey, County Limerick (1188 Monasteranenagh Abbey?)
- Abbeyknockmoy, County Galway (1190 Boyle Abbey)
- Abbey of Lerha, County Longford (1214)
- Abbeyleix, County Laois (1184 Baltinglass Abbey)
- Abbeymahon Abbey, County Cork. (1172 Baltinglass Abbey)
- Abbeyshrule, County Longford (1150 Mellifont Abbey)
- Abington Abbey, County Limerick (1206) Savigny†)
- Assaroe, County Donegal (1178)
- Baltinglass Abbey, County Wicklow (1148 Mellifont Abbey )
- Bective Abbey, County Meath (1147 Mellifont Abbey)
- Boyle Abbey, County Roscommon (1148 Mellifont Abbey)
- Comber Abbey, County Down (1199 Whitland Abbey)
- Corcomroe Abbey, County Clare (1194 Inislounaght Abbey)
- Dublin, St. Mary's Abbey, County Dublin (1139 Savigny†)
- Duiske Abbey, Graiguenamanagh, County Kilkenny (1204 Stanley Abbey)
- Dunbrody Abbey, County Wexford (1182 Dublin, St. Mary's Abbey)
- Erenagh Abbey, County Down, (1127 Savigny†)
- Fermoy Abbey, County Cork (1170 Inislounaght (Suir))
- Grey Abbey, Co, Down (1193 Holmcultram Abbey)
- Glangragh (Glanawydan) Abbey, County Waterford (1170 Inislounaght (Suir))
- Holy Cross, County Tipperary (1180 Monasteranenagh)
- Hore Abbey, County Tipperary (1272 Mellifont Abbey)
- Inch Abbey, County Down (1177)
- Inislounaght (Suir), County Tipperary (1148 Mellifont Abbey)
- Jerpoint Abbey, County Kilkenny (1180 Baltinglass Abbey)
- Kilbeggan Abbey, County Westmeath (1150 Mellifont Abbey)
- Kilshanny Abbey, County Clare (1198 Corcomroe Abbey)
- Kilcooly Abbey, County Tipperary (1185 Jerpoint Abbey)
- Kilenny Abbey, County Kilkenny (1162 Jerpoint Abbey)
- Macosquin Abbey, County Londonderry (1218 Unknown)
- Mellifont Abbey, County Louth (1142 Clairvaux)
- Midleton Abbey, County Cork (1180 Monasteranenagh)
- Monasteranenagh, County Limerick (1148 Mellifont Abbey)
- Monasterevin Abbey, County Kildare (1178 Baltinglass Abbey)
- Newry Abbey, County Down (1153 Mellifont Abbey)
- Tintern Abbey (Tintern Parva), County Wexford (1200 Tintern Abbey (Tintern Major))
- Tracton Abbey, County Cork (1224 Whitland Abbey)
- Beaubec Abbey, County Meath (Unknown Furness Abbey)

†Note: The Savigniac order was founded in 1105 but by 1147 due to financial issues all Savigniac Abbeys were absorbed into the Cistercian order

== See also ==
- List of Cistercian abbeys in Britain
- List of abbeys and priories in Ireland
- Cistercian Order
