= John Walbran =

John Walbran may refer to:

- John Thomas Walbran, English-Canadian ship's master and writer
- John Richard Walbran, British antiquarian
