= Inislounaght Abbey =

12th-century Cistercian settlement in Ireland

- Inis Leamhnachta
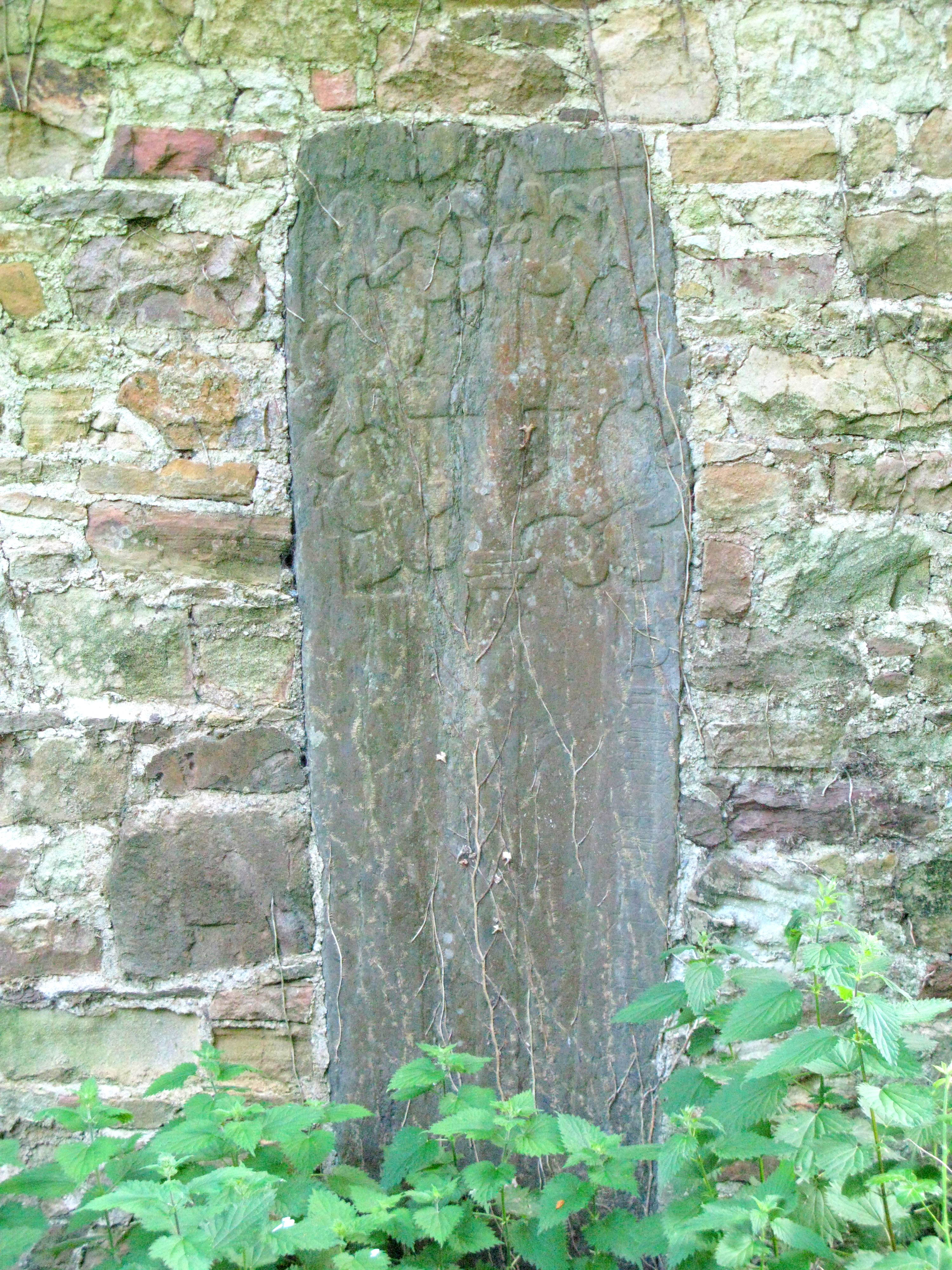
- Inscribed stone, thought to be grave marker of Crusader interred at Abbey.

- Location within Ireland
- Interactive map of Inislounaght Abbey

Monastery information
- Other name: de Surio
- Order: Cistercian
- Denomination: Catholic
- Established: before AD 656
- Disestablished: 1540
- Reestablished: 1147/48
- Mother house: Monasteranenagh Abbey
- Dedication: Virgin Mary
- Diocese: Cashel and Emly

People
- Founder: Saint Pulcherius

Architecture
- Status: Ruined
- Functional status: Inactive
- Style: Late Gothic

Site
- Location: Inislounaght, Marlfield, Clonmel, County Tipperary
- Country: Ireland
- Coordinates: 52°20′55″N 7°44′39″W
- Visible remains: No visible remains

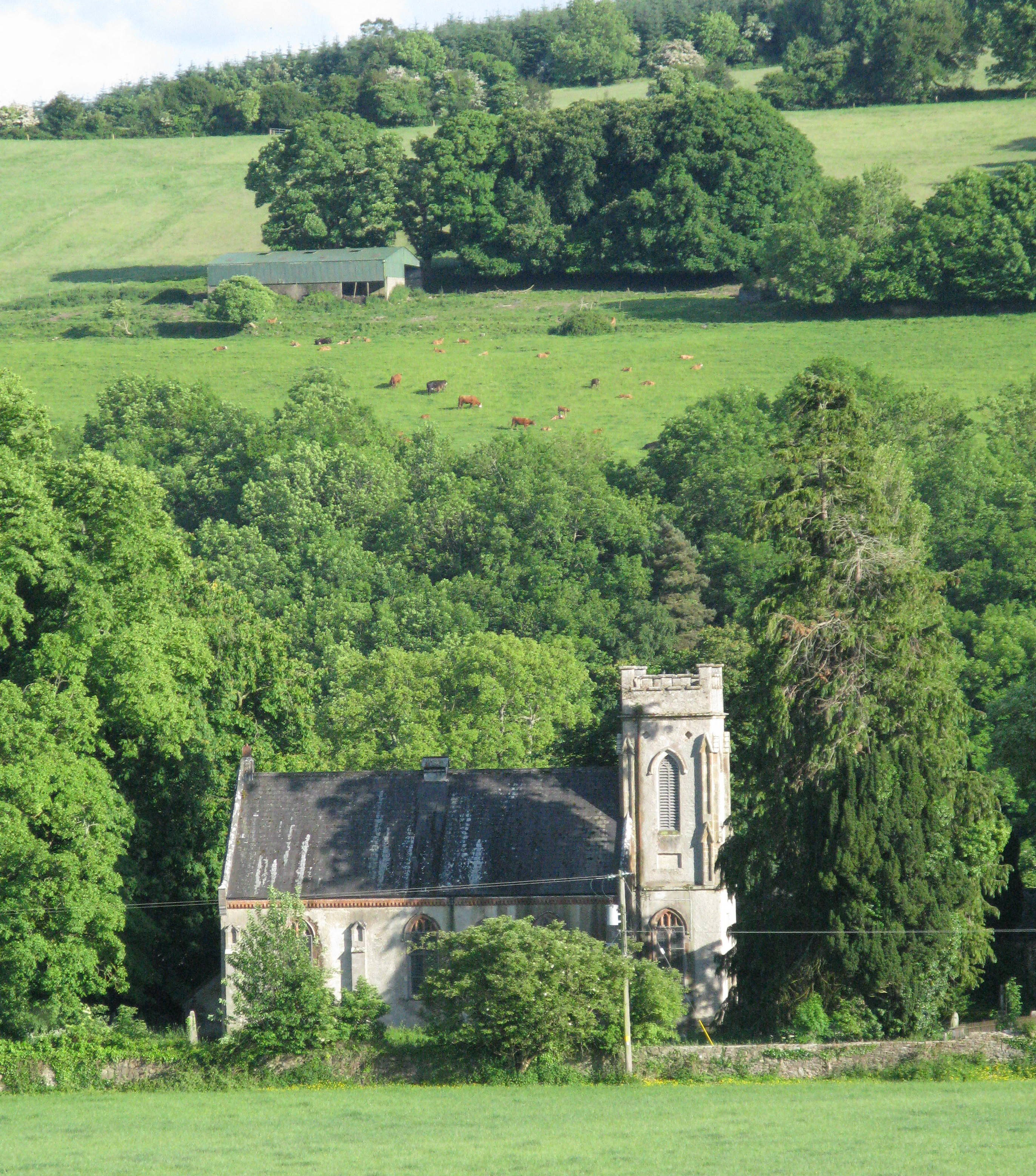
View of St Patrick's Church and the formey abbeylands at Inishlounaght

Inislounaght Abbey (Irish: Mainistir Inis Leamhnachta - "monastery on the island of fresh milk"), also referred to as Innislounaght, Inislounacht and De Surio, was a 12th-century Cistercian settlement on the river Suir, near Clonmel in County Tipperary, Ireland. It was originally dedicated to the Blessed Virgin.

== Foundation ==
There was an ancient monastery on the site, founded before 656 by Saint Pulcherius.

The abbey was refounded between 1142 and 1148 on lands donated by Malachy O'Phelan, lord of the Decies (part of which was in present-day County Waterford), and Donald O'Brien, king of Munster. It was located in rich agricultural land, about three kilometres west of Clonmel, on the northern bank of the river Suir. In 1240, a group of English monks from Furness Abbey were sent to replace the former abbot who had been excommunicated in 1234 following a legal dispute with the abbot of Dunbrody. Nine years later responsibility for the Abbey was transferred from Mellifont to Furness. In 1397, the Earls of Desmond and of Ormond met here to seal a treaty of peace. As with similar treaties between them, it did not last long.

== Decline ==
In the 16th century, the Abbey lands came under the direct control of the Butler dynasty. According to Burke, "Amid the hundreds of religious houses which studded the country at the time of the Reformation, Innislounaght stood distinguished and alone in evil prominence".

That in the same quarter of Tipperary, how James Butler, Abbey of Inislounaght and Dean of Lismore, hath sundry times disobeyed the King's writ and is a man of odious life, taking yearly and daily men's wives and burgess' daughters and keepeth no divine service but spends the goods of his church in voluptuosity, and mortgages the lands of his church and so the house is all decayed, and useth coyne and livery.
From the Jury of the city of Waterford to the King's Commissioners. October 12 1537.

No trace of the Abbey now remains in its former location. There was still at least one arch standing in the early nineteenth century but much of the stonework is thought to have been used in the building of local mills, the present church (arch over entrance), and the Main Guard in nearby Clonmel (columns and associated elements). According to literary historian Patrick Leo (PL) Henry, Inislounaght may have been the inspiration for the fourteenth-century scathingly satirical poem Land of Cokaygne. The name was recorded as "Abby Slunnagh" in the maps and notes of the Down Survey. It is believed to have been located slightly to the west of the 19th century St. Patrick's Church graveyard, near the present day village of Marlfield. Efforts to locate its foundations in the 1840s by the Ordnance Survey were not successful.

It is mentioned in Geoffrey Keating's Foras Feasa ar Éirinn (c. 1634) in a description of the region:

These descendants of Fiachaidh Suighdhe, who are called the Deise, possessed only the district known as Deise Dheisceirt, that is, from the Siuir southwards to the sea, and from Lios Mor to Ceann Criadain, up to the time when Eithne Uathach was married to Aonghus son of Natfraoch, king of Munster. For it was about that time that Aonghus gave them Deise Thuaisceirt, that is, from the same Siuir to Corca Athrach, which is called the Plain of Cashel. And O Faolain, who came from that stock, was king of Deise Thuaisceirt; and the place in which his residence was situated was on the brink of the Siuir to the west of Inis Leamhnachta; and Dun Ui Fhaolain is the name it is called to-day.

== Monks associated with Inislounaght ==
- Congan, Abbot in 1148. Requested St. Bernard to write 'The Life of St. Malachy'(De vita et rebus gestis S. Maiachiae, Hiberniae episcopi).
- Malmaire O'Brien, (otherwise Mairín Ó Briain), former Archbishop of Cashel, buried here in 1236.
- Abbot Patrick, died 1462.
- Abbotship disputed between Richard Loundres, Dermot O'Heffernan and William O'Dineen. Pope Paul II confirms Dineen in 1468.
- Thomas Ochael appointed by Pope Innocent VIII on 19 May 1492.
- Walter Butler, Abbot in 1503.
- James Butler, appointed Abbot in 1510
- Nicholas Fagan, Abbot, died 1617.
- Laurence FitzHarris of New Ross, consecrated Abbot by Archbishop Fleming of Dublin on Trinity Sunday, 1625. FitzHarris was the last Abbot of Inislounaght, fleeing to France in 1649, to escape the Cromwellian regime.

Unless otherwise indicated, all sourced from Burke pp406–423

== Sources ==
- CONWAY (Rev. Columcille). "The Cistercian abbey of Inislounaght," Journal of the Clonmel Historical and Archaeological Society, i, no. 4, pp. 3–52. (1955–56)
- Colmcille Ó Conbhuidhe, Finbarr Donovan. The Cistercian Abbeys of Tipperary, Four Courts Press, 1999 ISBN 978-1-85182-380-2
- Burke William P., History of Clonmel 1907 (facsimile reprinted 1983)
