= John Thomas Walbran =

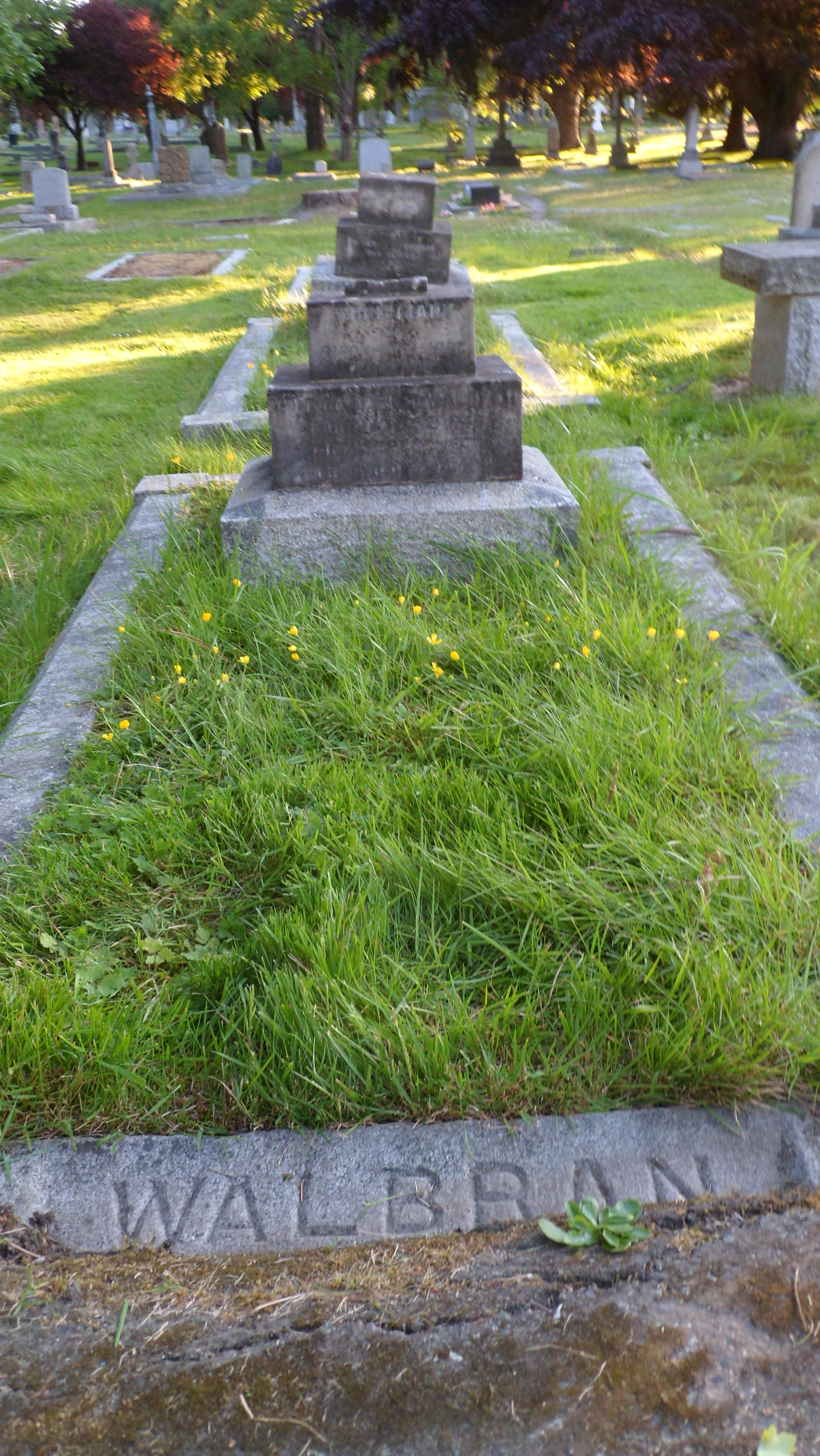
The grave of Anne and John Walbran in Ross Bay Cemetery

John Thomas Walbran (1848 – 31 March 1913) was an English-Canadian ship's master and writer.

== Biography ==
John Thomas Walbran was born in Ripon, England, in 1848. He became qualified as a ship's master in 1881. On the coast of British Columbia from 1888 to 1890 he was employed by the Canadian Pacific Navigation Company. From 1891 until retirement in 1904, he worked primarily on the Pacific Coast in the Georgian Bay Survey, subsequently renamed the Canadian Hydrographic Service. He was the first captain of the DGS Quadra. He is best known for authorship of British Columbia Coast Names originally published in 1909, reprinted in 1971 and widely and frequently cited.

== Death ==
John Thomas Walbran died at St. Joseph's Hospital on 31 March 1913 and was buried in Ross Bay Cemetery in Victoria, British Columbia.

== Legacy ==
Walbran Island, Walbran Point, and Carmanah Walbran Provincial Park are named after him.

== See also ==
- John Richard Walbran
