= Fountains Abbey =

Ruined Cistercian monastery in Yorkshire, England

- The Abbey church viewed from West

- Location of Fountains Abbey in North Yorkshire
- 54°6′35″N 1°34′53″W
- Location: Near Aldfield, North Yorkshire, England

History
- Built: 1132

Site notes
- Governing body: National Trust
- Owner: National Trust
- Website: https://www.nationaltrust.org.uk/fountains-abbey-and-studley-royal-water-garden

UNESCO World Heritage Site
- Official name: Studley Royal Park including the Ruins of Fountains Abbey
- Type: Cultural
- Criteria: i, iv
- Designated: 1986 (10th session)
- Reference no.: 372
- Country: United Kingdom
- Region: Europe and North America

Listed Building – Grade I
- Official name: Fountains Abbey, with Ancillary Buildings
- Designated: 11 June 1986
- Reference no.: 1149811

Fountains Abbey is a ruined Cistercian monastery near Ripon in North Yorkshire, England. It was founded in 1132 under the direction of Thurstan, archbishop of York, and over the next four centuries became one of the wealthiest monasteries in England thanks to its large and diverse landholdings. The monastery was dissolved in 1539 as part of the English Reformation and its estates sold. Fountains Abbey is now within Studley Royal Park, a landscaped garden created in the eighteenth century.

Even in its current state, Fountains is described by Historic England as "the best preserved of English abbeys and [...] the finest picturesque ruin." The majority of the buildings were constructed in the Romanesque and Early English Gothic style between 1170 and 1247, with significant additions in the late fifteenth and early sixteenth centuries. The abbey church and many of the claustral buildings survive, including the chapter house, refectory, and lay brothers' dormitory, as well as ancillary structures such as the guest houses, abbey mill, and bridges.

The abbey is protected for its historic significance, having been designated a grade I listed building and a scheduled monument by Historic England. It also forms part of the Studley Royal including the ruins of Fountains Abbey World Heritage Site. It is owned by the National Trust and maintained by English Heritage, and is open to the public.

== Foundation ==
After a dispute and riot in 1132 at the Benedictine house of St Mary's Abbey, York, thirteen monks were expelled, among them Robert of Newminster, who was later canonised. They were taken under the protection of Thurstan, Archbishop of York, who provided them with land in the valley of the River Skell, a tributary of the Ure. The enclosed valley had all the natural features needed for the creation of a monastery, providing shelter from the weather; stone and timber for building; and a supply of running water. The six springs that watered the site inspired the monks to give it the name of Fountains.

After enduring a harsh winter in 1133, the monks applied to join the Cistercian order, which since the end of the previous century had been a fast-growing reform movement and by the beginning of the 13th century had more than 500 houses. In 1135 Fountains became the second Cistercian house in northern England, after Rievaulx Abbey. The monks of Fountains became subject to Clairvaux Abbey in Burgundy, which was under the rule of St Bernard. Under the guidance of Geoffrey of Ainai, a monk sent from Clairvaux, the group learned how to celebrate the seven canonical hours according to Cistercian usage and were shown how to construct wooden buildings in accordance with Cistercian practice.

== Consolidation ==
According to archaeologist Glyn Coppack, after Henry Murdac was elected abbot in 1143 the small stone church and timber claustral buildings were replaced; the new church was similar in plan to the church at Vauclair Abbey that Murdac had previously commissioned. Within three years an aisled nave had been added to the stone church, and the first permanent claustral buildings, built in stone and roofed in tile, had been completed.

In 1146 an angry mob, annoyed at Murdac because of his role in opposing the election of William FitzHerbert as archbishop of York, attacked the abbey and burned down all but the church and some surrounding buildings. The community recovered swiftly from the attack and founded four daughter houses. Henry Murdac resigned as abbot in 1147 upon becoming archbishop of York. He was replaced first by Maurice, abbot of Rievaulx (1147–8), then, on the resignation of Maurice, by Thorald (1148–50). Thorald was forced by Murdac, now archbishop, to resign after two years in office.

The next abbot, Richard, restored the abbey's stability and prosperity. During his twenty years as abbot he supervised an extensive building programme that involved completing repairs to the damaged church and building more accommodation for the increasing number of recruits. At his death in 1170 the chapter house was complete and the new church almost finished. The work was continued by his successor, Robert of Pipewell.

The next abbot was William of Newminster, a noted ascetic, who presided over the abbey from 1180 to 1190. He was succeeded by Ralph Haget, who had entered Fountains at the age of 30 as a novice after pursuing a military career. Prior to his abbacy at Fountains, from 1182 to 1190/1 he was abbot of Kirkstall Abbey. During the European famine of 1194 the abbey provided support for six months to local people in the form of food, shelter and spiritual care. Famine was joined by the spread of disease, and the abbey helped those who needed treatment. During the first half of the 13th century Fountains increased in reputation and prosperity under John of York (1203–1211), John of Hessle (1211–1220) and John of Kent (1220–1247). These three abbots managed to complete another expansion of the abbey's buildings, which included enlarging the church and building an infirmary.

== Difficulties ==
During the late thirteenth and early fourteenth centuries, the north of England was subject to increased taxation, Fountains Abbey included. According to William Grainge, writing in Annals of a Yorkshire Abbey: A Popular History of the Famous Monastery of Fountains, the taxation of temporal goods had reduced from £343 in 1292, to £243 in 1318. Grainge interprets this reduction as evidence for detriment to the estate of the abbey. The abbey was criticised for its dire material and physical state when it was visited by Archbishop John le Romeyn in 1294, and by the 1330s was no longer working to surplus, but having to borrow money.

By the second half of the 13th century the abbey was in working in straitened circumstances. It was presided over by eleven abbots, and became financially unstable largely due to forward selling its wool crop. The run of disasters that befell the community continued into the early 14th century when northern England was invaded by the Scots and there were further demands for taxes. The culmination of these misfortunes was the Black Death of 1348–1349. The loss of manpower and income due to the ravages of the plague was almost ruinous.

A further complication arose as a result of the Papal Schism of 1378–1409. Fountains and other English Cistercian houses were told to break off contact with the mother house of Citeaux, which supported a rival pope. This resulted in the abbots forming their own chapter to rule the order in England, and they became increasingly involved in internecine politics. In 1410, following the death of Abbot Burley of Fountains, the community was riven by several years of turmoil over the election of his successor. John Ripon, abbot of Meaux, and Roger Frank, a monk of Fountains, were locked in conflict until 1416 when Ripon was finally appointed, ruling until his death in 1434.

Fountains Abbey - Huby's Tower

Fountains regained some stability and prosperity under abbots John Greenwell (1442–1471), Thomas Swinton (1471–1478), and John Darnton (1478–1495), who undertook some much needed restoration of the fabric of the abbey, including notable work on the church. During Greenwell's abbacy, he reduced the debts of the abbey by 1000 marks, and survived a poisoning attempt by a monk called William Downom. Swinton kept a detailed "Memorandum Book", which provides exceptional detail on the life of the abbey during his abbacy. Marmaduke Huby (1495–1526) expanded the number of monks from twenty-two to fifty-two and undertook a building programme which included an extension to the infirmary and a new tower attached to the north transept. Huby's Tower, as it became known, is decorated with the abbot's insignia, as well as religious texts.

At Abbot Huby's death he was succeeded by William Thirsk, who was accused by the royal commissioners of immorality and inadequacy and dismissed as abbot, retiring to Jervaulx Abbey; he was later hanged for his involvement in the Pilgrimage of Grace. He was replaced by Marmaduke Bradley, a monk of the abbey who had reported Thirsk's supposed offences and testified against him. Furthermore, Bradley paid 600 marks to essentially buy the abbacy for himself. In 1539 it was Bradley who surrendered the abbey when its seizure was ordered under Henry VIII at the dissolution of the monasteries.

== Abbots of Fountains ==
Abbots of Fountains
Name	Dates	Name	Dates	Name	Dates	Name	Dates
Richard	1132–39	John of Hessle	1211–20	Henry Otley	1289?–90	John Ripon	1416–34
Richard (II)	1139–43	John of Kent	1220–47	Robert Thornton	c. 1289–90	Thomas Paslew	1434–43
Henry Murdac	1144–47	Stephen of Easton	1247–52	Robert Bishopton	c. 1290/1–1311	John Martin	1442
Maurice	1147–48	William of Allerton	1252–58	William Rigton	1311–16	John Greenwell	1442–71
Thorold	1148–50	Adam	1258–59	Walter Coxwold	1316–36	Thomas Swinton	1471–78
Richard (III)	1150–70	Alexander	1259–65	Robert Copgrove	1336–46	John Darnton	1479–95
Robert of Pipewell	1170–80	Reginald	1267	Robert Monkton	1346–69	Marmaduke Huby	1495–1526
William of Newminster	1180–90	Peter Ayling	1275–79	William Gower	1369–84	William Thirsk	1526–36
Ralph Haget	1190–1203	Nicholas	1279	Robert Burley	1383–1410	Marmaduke Bradley	1536–39
John of York	1203–11	Adam Ravensworth	1280–84	Roger Frank	1410		

== Architecture ==
Interior of the abbey church looking down the nave

The abbey precinct covered 70 acres (28 ha) surrounded by an 11-foot (3.4 m) wall built in the 13th century, some parts of which are visible to the south and west of the abbey. The area consists of three concentric zones cut by the River Skell flowing from west to east across the site. The church and claustral buildings stand at the centre of the precinct north of the Skell. The inner court containing the domestic buildings stretches down to the river and the outer court housing the industrial and agricultural buildings lies on the river's south bank. The early abbey buildings were added to and altered over time, resulting in deviations from the strict Cistercian type. Outside the walls were the abbey's "home granges".

The original abbey church was built of wood and "was probably" two storeys high; it was, however, quickly replaced in stone. The church was damaged in the attack on the abbey in 1146 and was rebuilt, in a larger scale, on the same site. Building work was completed c. 1170. This structure, completed around 1170, was 300 ft (91 m) long and had 11 bays in the side aisles. A lantern tower was added at the crossing of the church in the late 12th century. The presbytery at the eastern end of the church was much altered in the 13th century. The church's greatly lengthened choir, commenced by Abbot John of York, 1203–11 and carried on by his successor, terminates, like that of Durham Cathedral, in an eastern transept, the work of Abbot John of Kent, 1220–47. Similarities to the choir at Beverley Minster have been drawn by architectural historian Lawrence Hoey. The 160-foot-tall (49 m) tower, which was added not long before the dissolution, by Abbot Huby, 1494–1526, is in an unusual position at the northern end of the north transept and bears Huby's motto: Soli Deo Honor et Gloria (Honor and Glory to God Alone). The sacristry adjoined the south transept.

The cloister, which had arcading of black marble from Nidderdale and white sandstone, is in the centre of the precinct and to the south of the church. The three-aisled chapter-house and parlour open from the eastern walk of the cloister, with the monks' dormitory above; along the cloister's southern walk are, from east to west, the warming house with muniment room above, the refectory, and the kitchens. Parallel with the western walk is an immense, vaulted substructure known as the cellarium (divided into sections serving as cellars and store-rooms, and with the lay brothers' refectory at its southern end, next to the kitchens), which supported the dormitory of the conversi (lay brothers) above. This building extended across the river and at its south-west corner were the latrines, built above the swiftly flowing stream.

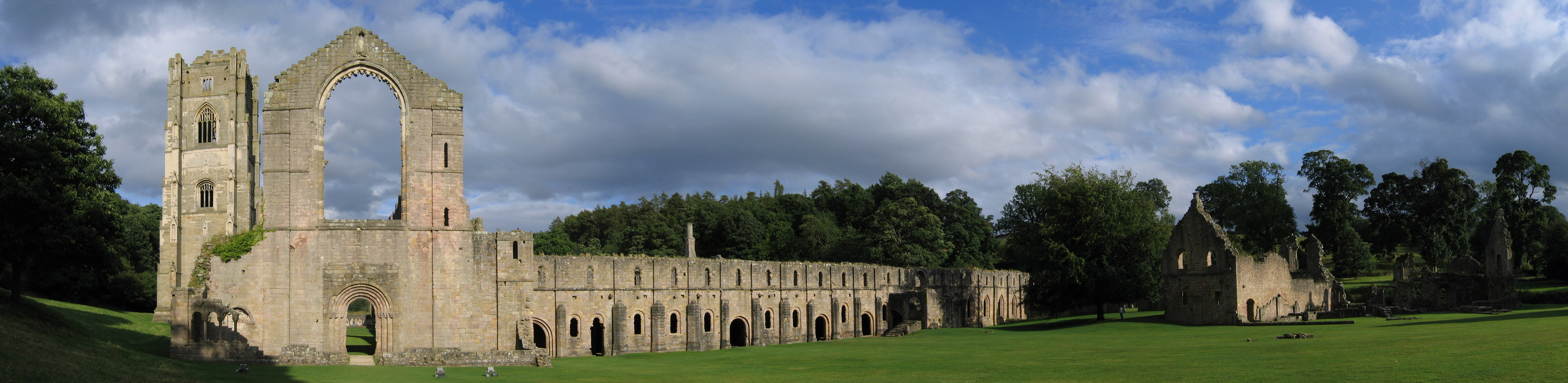
View of Fountains Abbey looking from west to south

The infirmary is located to the east of the latrine block, where portions of it are suspended on arches over the River Skell. It was built in the mid-12th century as a modest single-storey structure, then, from the 14th century, underwent extensive expansion and remodelling to end up in the 16th century as a grand dwelling with fine bay windows and large fireplaces. The great hall was an expansive room 171 by 69 feet (52 by 21 m), "one of the largest aisled halls ever built in mediaeval England". The infirmary had its own oratory or chapel, 46 1/2-by-23-foot (14 by 7 m), and a kitchen, 50-by-38-foot (15 by 12 m).

To the west of the cloister was the lay brothers' infirmary, and beyond that the two guest houses still visible, and a large guest hall to the north of them. Only the base of a pier and a table leg survive of the guest hall, but its plan has been established by geophysical survey.

To the east of the abbey, north of the infirmary, is the monks' cemetery. It was long known to exist, but its extent and arrangement were only discovered in 2016, when a partnership between the National Trust, the University of Bradford, Geoscan Research, Magnitude Surveys and Guideline Geo used ground penetrating radar which discovered several hundred graves in a careful and orderly arrangement.

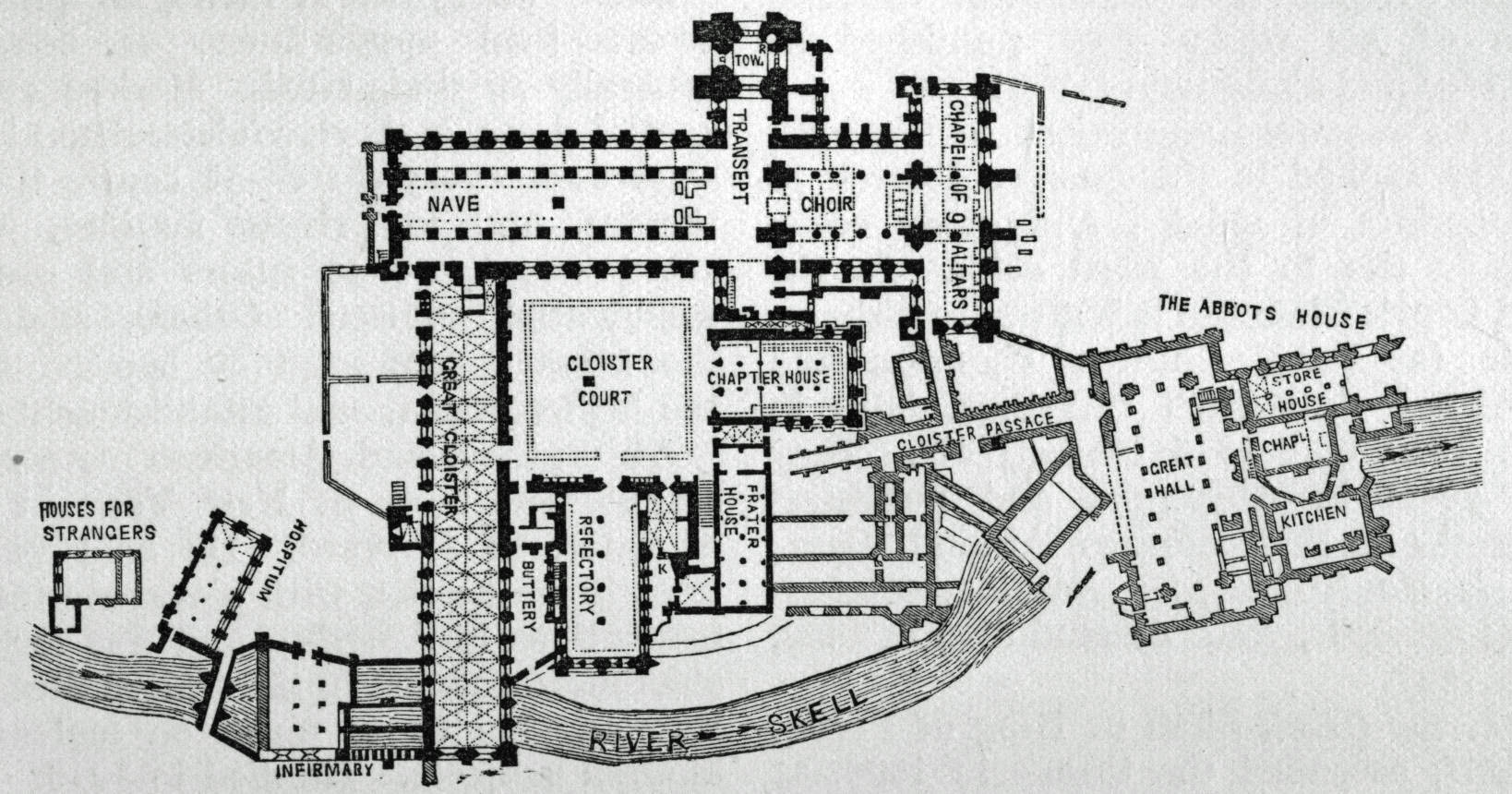
Ground plan of Fountains Abbey as understood in the early 20th century. The buildings labelled "Abbots House" are now known to be the infirmary: the abbot's house was the buildings between the "cloister passage" and the river. The building to the west of the cloister labelled "Infirmary" is now known to have been the lay brothers' infirmary.

== Endowments and economy ==
Medieval monasteries were sustained by landed estates that were given to them as endowments and from which they derived an income from rents. They were the gifts of the founder and subsequent patrons, but some were purchased from cash revenues. At the outset, the Cistercian order rejected gifts of mills and rents, churches with tithes and feudal manors as they did not accord with their belief in monastic purity, because they involved contact with laymen. When Archbishop Thurstan founded the abbey he gave the community 260 acres (110 ha) of land at Sutton north of the abbey and 200 acres (81 ha) at Herleshowe to provide support while the abbey became established. In the early years the abbey struggled to maintain itself because further gifts were not forthcoming. Thurstan could not help further because the lands he administered were not his own, but part of the diocesan estate. After several years of impoverished struggle to establish the abbey, the monks were joined by Hugh, a former dean of York Minster, a rich man who brought a considerable fortune as well as furniture and books to start the library.

By 1135 the monks had acquired only another 260 acres (110 ha) at Cayton, given by Eustace fitzJohn of Knaresborough "for the building of the abbey". Shortly after the fire of 1146, the monks had established granges at Sutton, Cayton, Cowton Moor, Warsill, Dacre and Aldburgh all within 6 mi (10 km) of Fountains. In the 1140s the water mill was built on the abbey site, so that the grain from the granges could be brought to the abbey for milling.

In October 2021, the National Trust announced that they had uncovered the foundations of a 12th- to 13th-century tannery at the abbey, described as being of "industrial" scale. The foundations, located close to the River Skell, were discovered using ground-penetrating radar, revealing a number of previously-unknown monastic buildings along a long, "bowling alley-type extension" whose use had long been unknown.

Further estates were assembled in two phases, between 1140 and 1160 then 1174 and 1175, from piecemeal acquisitions of land. Some of the lands were grants from benefactors but others were purchased from gifts of money to the abbey. Roger de Mowbray granted large areas of Nidderdale and William de Percy and his tenants granted substantial estates in Craven which included Malham Moor and the fishery in Malham Tarn. After 1203 the abbots consolidated the abbey's lands by renting out more distant areas that the monks could not easily farm themselves, and exchanging and purchasing lands that complemented their existing estates. Fountains' holdings both in Yorkshire and beyond had reached their maximum extent by 1265, when they were an efficient and very profitable estate. Their estates were linked in a network of individual granges which provided staging posts to the most distant ones. They had urban properties in York, Yarm, Grimsby, Scarborough and Boston from which to conduct export and market trading and their other commercial interests included mining, quarrying, iron-smelting, fishing and milling.

Apart from the renting out of land, the monks themselves and their laybrothers, numerous in the early period, were committed on a large scale to its efficient development and the management of the landscape, not least the watercourses and woods.

The Battle of Bannockburn in 1314 was a factor that led to a downturn in the prosperity of the abbey in the early fourteenth century. Areas of the north of England as far south as York were looted by the Scots. Then the number of lay-brothers being recruited to the order reduced considerably. The abbey chose to take advantage of the relaxation of the edict on leasing property that had been enacted by the General Chapter of the order in 1208 and leased some of their properties. Others were staffed by hired labour and remained in hand under the supervision of bailiffs. In 1535 Fountains had an interest in 138 vills and the total taxable income of the Fountains estate was £1,115, making it the richest Cistercian monastery in England.

== Burials ==
- Roger de Mowbray, 1st Baron Mowbray
- John de Mowbray, 2nd Baron Mowbray
- Abbot Marmaduke Huby (d. 1526)
- Rose (daughter of Richard de Clare, 6th Earl of Gloucester), wife of Roger de Mowbray, 1st Baron Mowbray
- Henry de Percy, 1st Baron Percy
- William II de Percy, 3rd feudal baron of Topcliffe

== After the Dissolution ==
Gresham family crest

The Abbey buildings and land were seized by the Crown, and sold on 1 October 1540 to Sir Richard Gresham, at the time a Member of Parliament (MP) and previously Lord Mayor of London, the father of Sir Thomas Gresham. It was Richard Gresham who had supplied Cardinal Wolsey with the tapestries for his new residence of Hampton Court and who paid for the Cardinal's funeral.

In 1597 the site was acquired by Sir Stephen Proctor, who built Fountains Hall. Between 1627 and 1767 the estate was owned by the Messenger family. They sold it to William Aislabie who was responsible for combining it with the Studley Royal Estate.

== Current status ==
The abbey is a Grade I listed building owned by the National Trust and is part of the designated Studley Royal Park including the Ruins of Fountains Abbey UNESCO World Heritage Site.

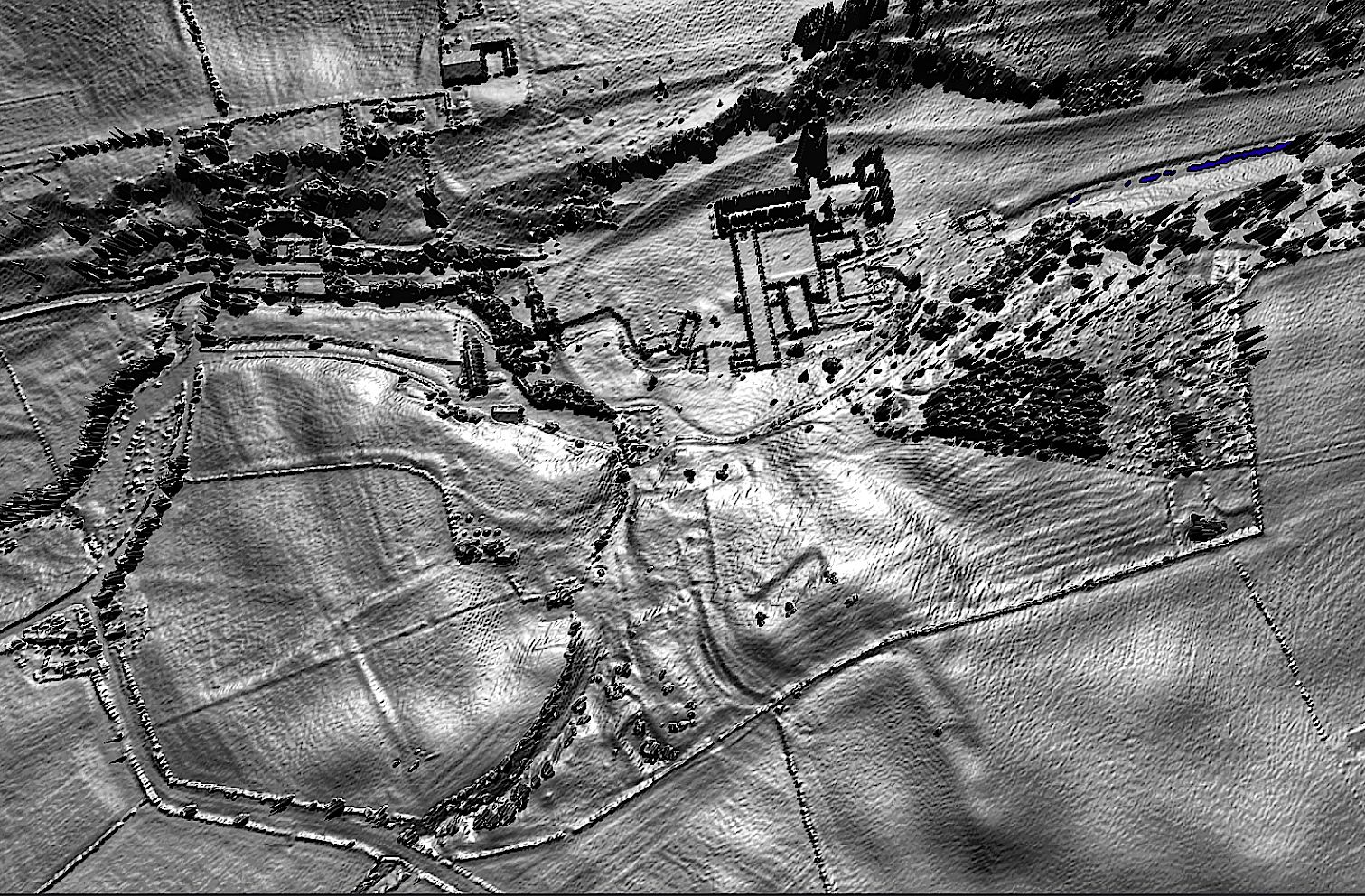
A lidar view of the abbey and landscape.

The archaeological excavation of the site began under the supervision of John Richard Walbran, a Ripon antiquary who, in 1846, had published a paper On the Necessity of clearing out the Conventual Church of Fountains. In 1966, the Abbey was placed in the guardianship of the Department of the Environment and the estate was purchased by the West Riding County Council, who transferred ownership to North Yorkshire County Council in 1974. The National Trust bought the 674-acre (273 ha) Fountains Abbey and Studley Royal estate from North Yorkshire County Council in 1983.

=== World Heritage Site designation ===
In 1986 the parkland in which the abbey is situated and the abbey was designated a World Heritage Site by UNESCO. It was recognised for fulfilling the criteria of "being a masterpiece of human creative genius", and "an outstanding example of a type of building or architectural or technological ensemble or landscape which illustrates significant stages in human history."

=== National Trust ownership ===
Fountains Abbey is owned by the National Trust and maintained by English Heritage. The trust also owns Studley Royal Park, and Fountains Hall, and manages St Mary's Church, designed by William Burges and built around 1873 (owned by English Heritage). All of these are significant features of the World Heritage Site. In January 2010, Fountains Abbey and Studley Royal became two of the first National Trust properties to be included in Google Street View, using the Google Trike.

=== Exhibition and display ===
Fountains Mill

Fountains Mill is the former corn mill, built in the mid-twelfth century by the community. There were two waterwheels installed, run from a leat taken from the Rover Skell. It was later used as a sawmill, and in 1928 a turbine was installed to convert the building to the production of electricity. The turbine installation ended the building's over 800 years of continuous use as a mill. It was refurbished and opened as an exhibition space in 2000. During 2022 the temporary exhibition was of work by the Yorkshire-based photographer Joe Cornish.

The Porter's Lodge, which was once the gatehouse to the abbey, houses a modern exhibition area with displays about the history of Fountains Abbey and how the monks lived. The centrepiece of the display is a scale model of the abbey at the time of the Dissolution. Following a suggestion by Commander Clare George Vyner, it was designed by the architect and artist Arthur Edward Henderson (1870–1956), and constructed from plastic by P Kemp and E Wilson at workshops in Surbiton. The model, measuring some 10 feet by 7 feet and weighing about a ton, was donated on 23 April 1952. Henderson's book on Fountains Abbey compares photographs of various parts of the ruin with his drawings of how that section would have looked originally.

=== Climate crisis ===
Since 2006 assessment of the impact of climate change has been an essential requirement for the management of World Heritage Sites. In early 2021 a National Trust press release stated that the abbey "is at risk of being irreparably damaged by flooding, with several instances in recent years [particularly in 2007] when the 12th-century ruins and water garden have been deluged by water". Funding from the National Lottery Heritage Fund was subsequently awarded and was intended to help finance the Skell Valley Scheme, which would "rejuvenate 12 miles of the River Skell" to help minimize the risk of flooding.

== Cultural significance ==
=== On screen ===
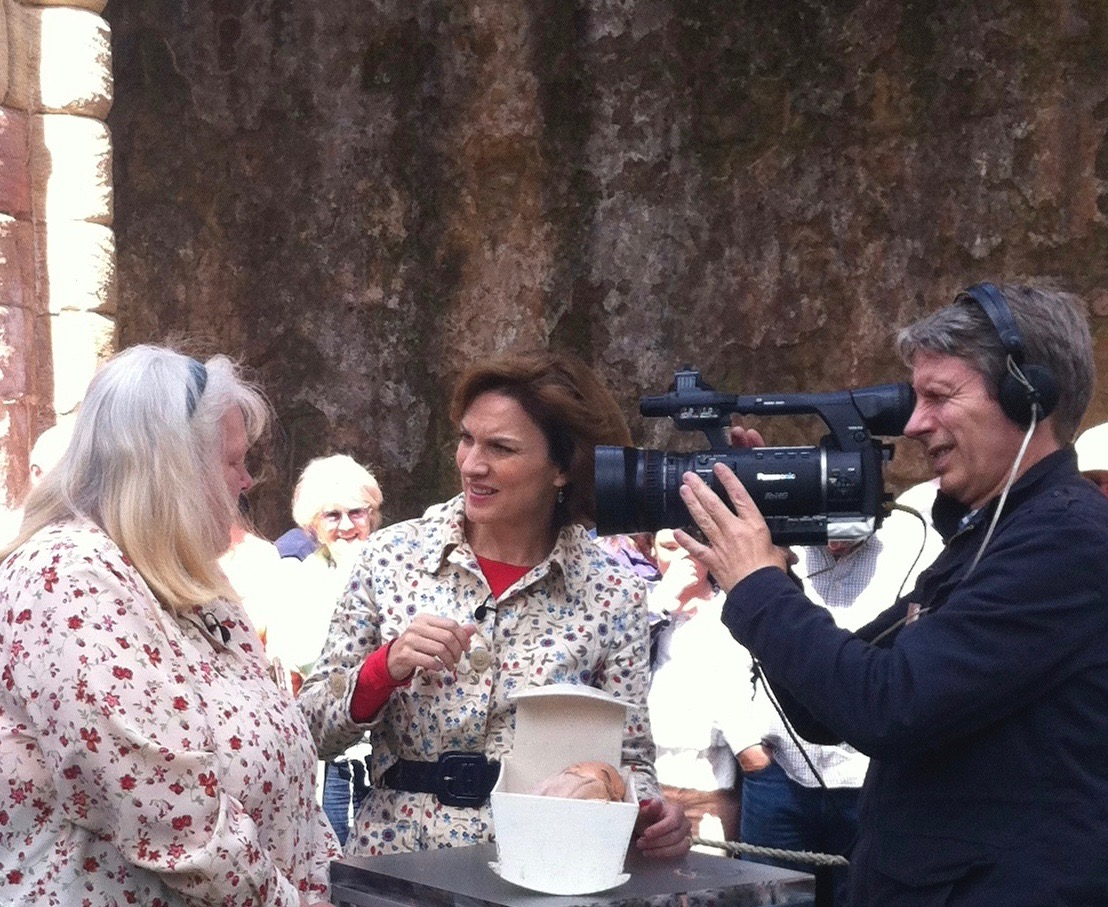
Fiona Bruce, Antiques Roadshow - 2004

During the cold winter of December 1981 Fountains Abbey was used as a location by Orchestral Manoeuvres in the Dark for the music video of their single "Maid of Orleans (The Waltz Joan of Arc)".

In 1972 the abbey was the setting for Alan Bennett's first televised play, A Day Out. In 1980, the final scenes of Omen III: The Final Conflict were filmed there. Other film productions that have used locations at the abbey include the films Life at the Top, both The Secret Garden (1993) and The Secret Garden (2020), The History Boys, and 28 Years Later.

In October and November 2020, a number of scenes of the second season of the Netflix original The Witcher were filmed in the abbey and its surroundings. The TV programmes Flambards, A History of Britain, Terry Jones' Medieval Lives, Cathedral, Treasure Hunt, and Gunpowder, have also been filmed there.

=== In literature ===
Fountains Abbey features twice in Fisher's Drawing Room Scrap Books with poetical illustrations by Letitia Elizabeth Landon. In the 1833 edition to a painting of the ruins by N. W. Hook and in the 1836 edition to a view of the interior vaults by Nathaniel Whittock.

== Gallery ==
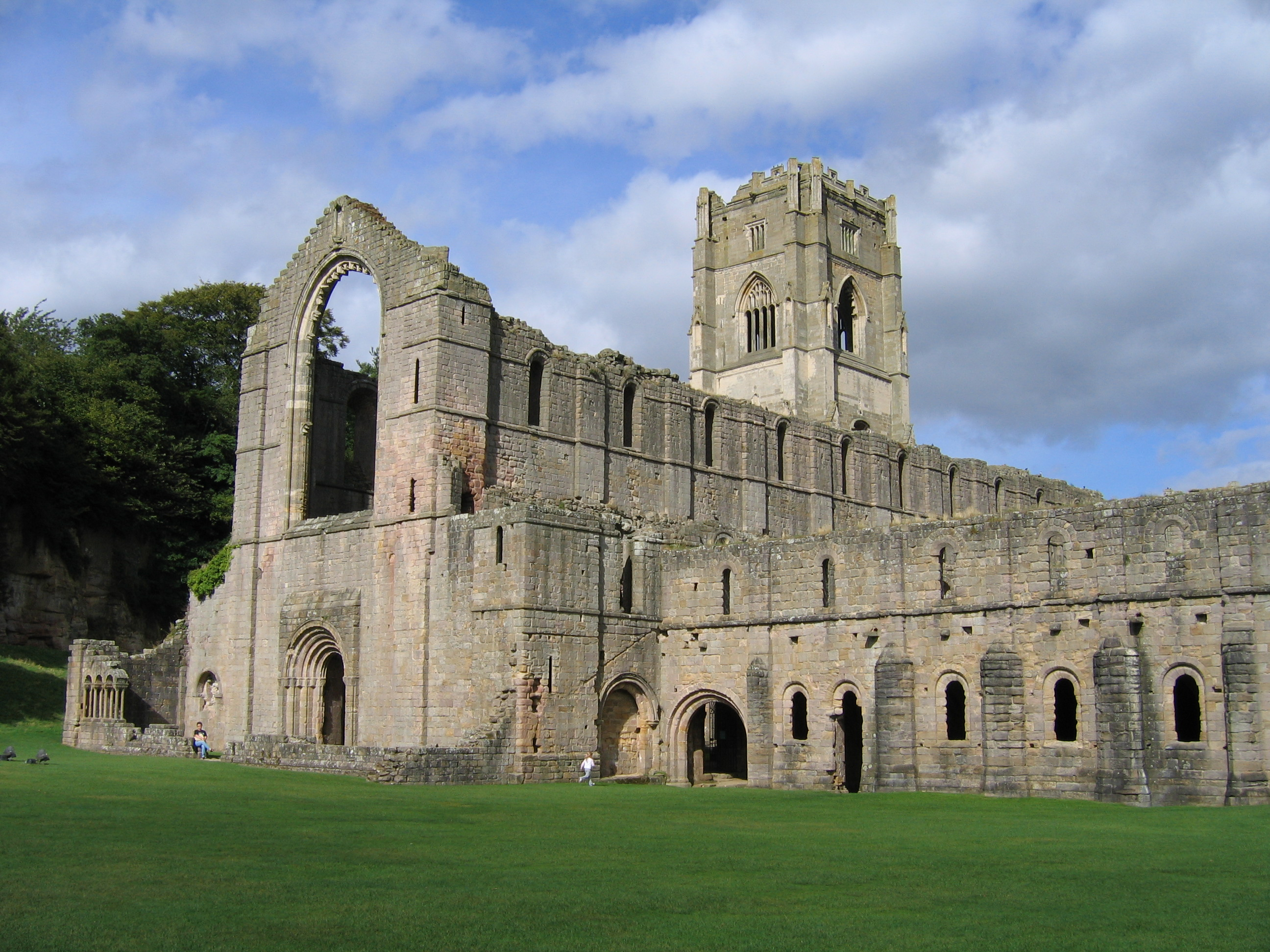
Fountains Abbey from the west

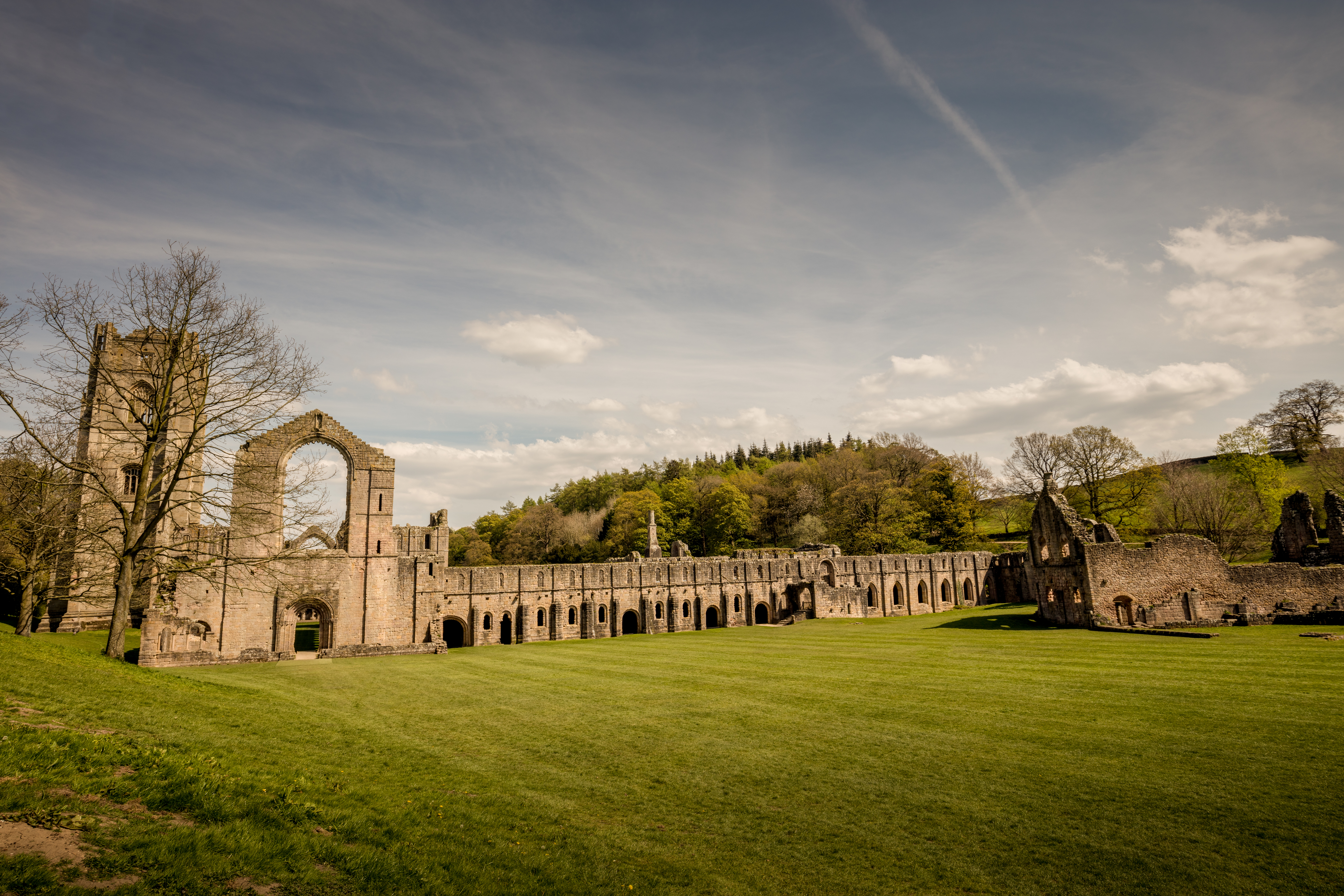
Fountains Abbey Exterior

Fountains Abbey church side aisle

Compleyte view of the abbey ruins

The abbey church viewed from East

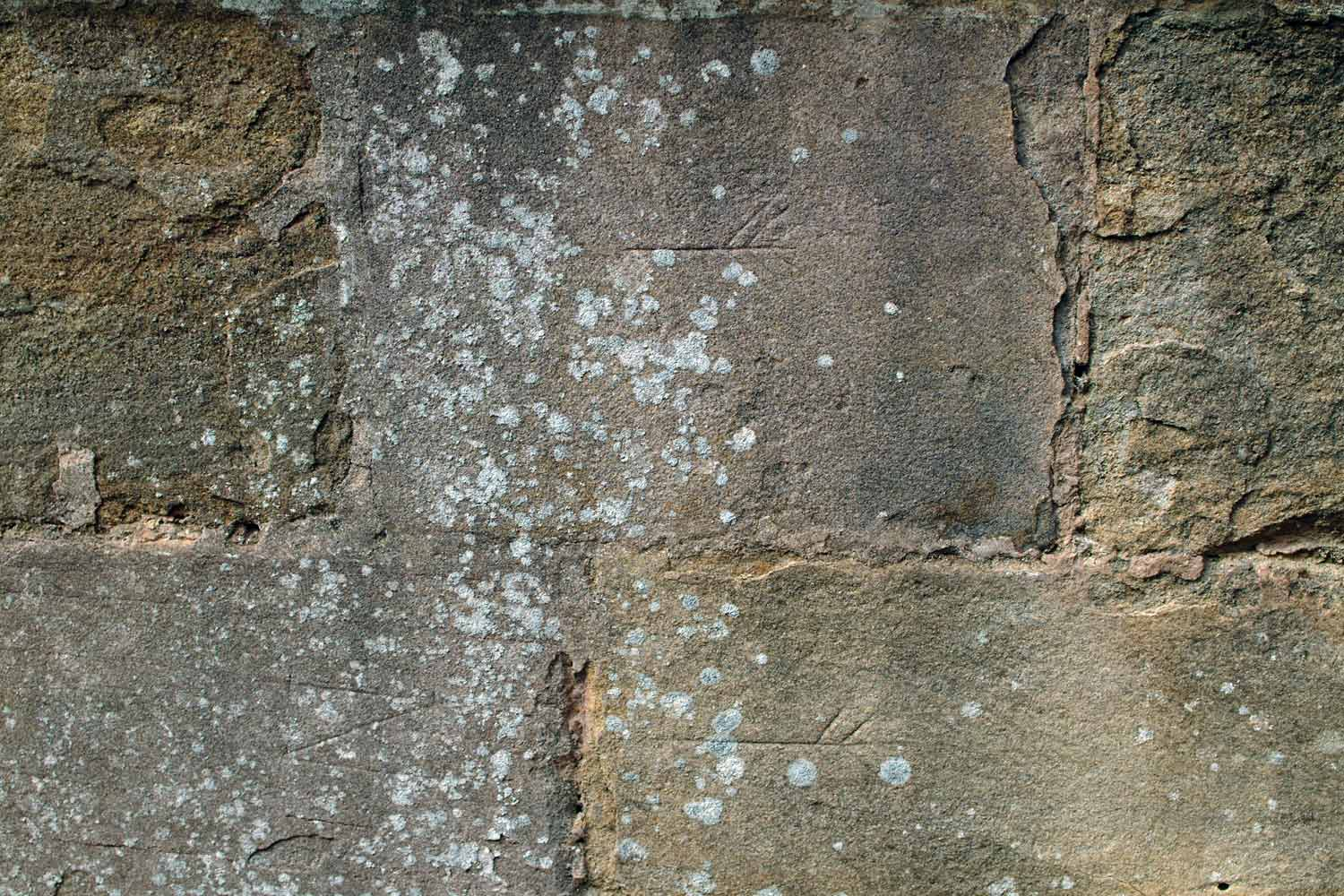
Fountains Abbey Stonemason marks in the Chapter House

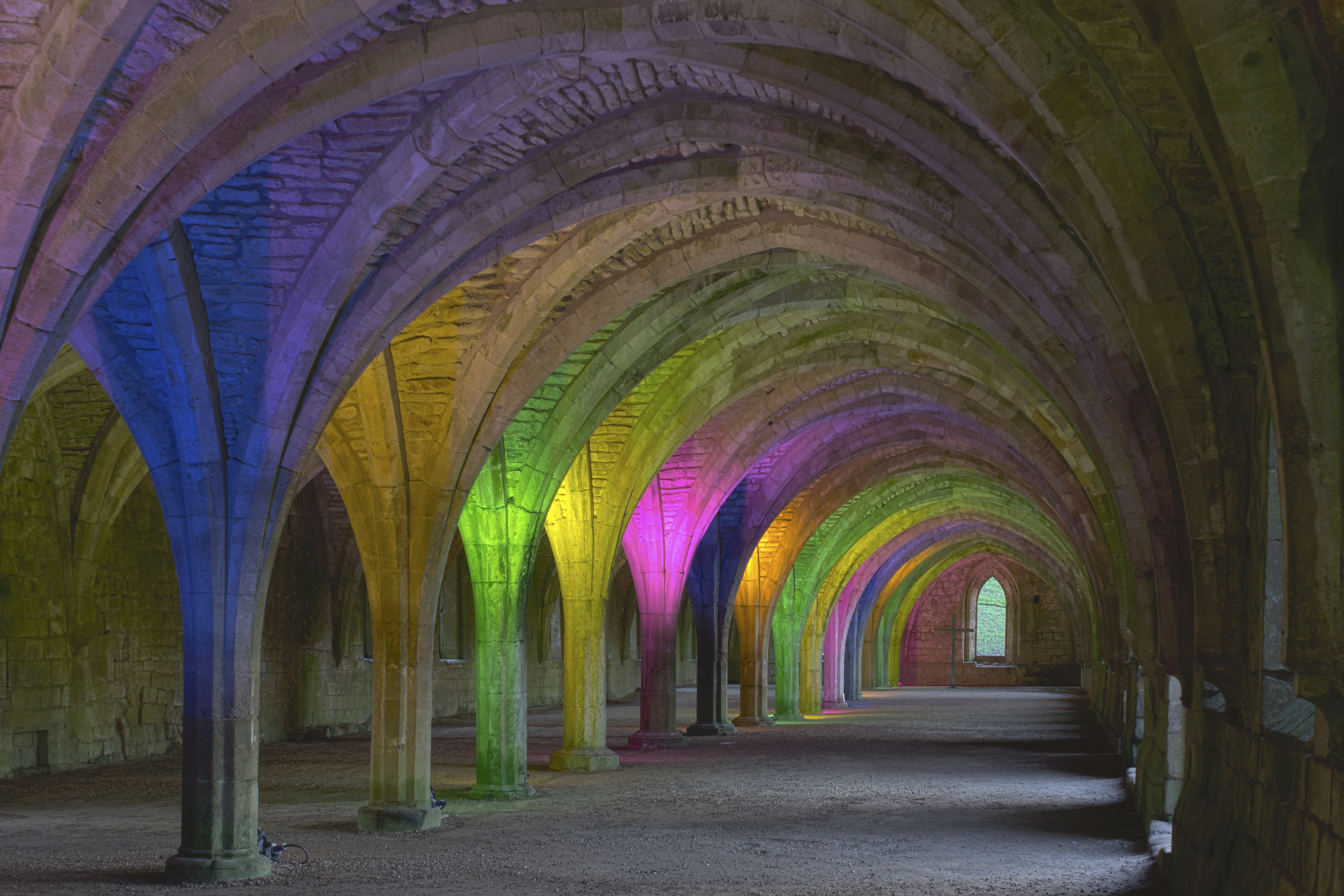
Fountains Abbey monks' cellarium (larder)

Portals to the Chapter house

Part of the ruins and the tower

Fountains Abbey vaulted cellarium (larder)

Remains of a side chapel

Ruins of the Arches at Fountains Abbey

== See also ==
- Listed buildings in Lindrick with Studley Royal and Fountains
- Grade I listed buildings in North Yorkshire (district)
- List of Cistercian abbeys in Britain
- List of monasteries dissolved by Henry VIII of England
- Stonemasonry
- Studley Royal Park
