= List of Cistercian abbeys in Britain =

This is a List of Cistercian monasteries (called abbeys) in Great Britain. The first Cistercian abbey in Great Britain was Waverley Abbey in Surrey, founded in 1128. In the next few years further abbeys were founded in other parts of Britain, notably Yorkshire and in Scotland and Wales.

== Currently active abbeys ==
- Caldey Abbey, Caldey Island, Pembroke, Wales (1906, Cistercian from 1929, Trappist)
- Mount St. Bernard Abbey, Leicestershire, England (1835, Trappist)
- Nunraw Abbey, East Lothian, Scotland (1946, Trappist)
- Holy Cross Abbey in Whitland, Wales Trappist

== Abbeys, now dissolved, ruined or destroyed ==
Given in brackets are the date of foundation and the motherhouse which established the Abbey.

- Aberconwy Abbey, Gwynedd, Wales (1283 Whitland)
- Abbey Dore, Herefordshire, England (1147 Morimond)
- Balmerino Abbey, Fife, Scotland (1227 Melrose)
- Basingwerk Abbey, Flintshire, Wales (1131 Savigny)
- Beaulieu Abbey, Hampshire, England (1203 Citeaux)
- Biddlesden Abbey, Buckinghamshire, England (1147 Waverley)
- Bindon Abbey, Dorset, England (1172 Waverley)
- Bordesley Abbey, Worcestershire, England (1138 Waverley)
- Boxley Abbey, Kent, England (1143 Clairvaux)
- Bruern Abbey, Oxfordshire, England (1147 Waverley)
- Buckfast Abbey, Devon, England (1136 Savigny)
- Buckland Abbey, Devon, England (1278 Savigny)
- Buildwas Abbey, Shropshire, England (1135 Savigny)
- Byland Abbey, North Yorkshire, England (1135 Furness)
- Calder Abbey, Cumbria, England (1143 Furness)
- Cleeve Abbey, Somerset, England (1198 Rievaulx)
- Coggeshall Abbey, Essex, England (1140 Savigny)
- Combe Abbey, Warwickshire, England (1150 Waverley)
- Combermere Abbey, Cheshire, England (1133 Savigny)
- Coupar Angus Abbey, Perth and Kinross, Scotland (pre. 1154 Melrose)
- Croxden Abbey, Staffordshire, England (1176 Aunay-sur-Odon)
- Culross Abbey, Fife, Scotland (pre. 1217 Melrose)
- Cwmhir Abbey, Powis, Wales (1143 Whitland)
- Cymer Abbey, Gwynedd, Wales (1199 Whitland)
- Deer Abbey, Aberdeenshire, Scotland (1219 Melrose)
- Dieulacres Abbey, Staffordshire, England (1214 Combermere)
- Dundrennan Abbey, Dumfries and Galloway, Scotland (1142 Rievaulx)
- Dunkeswell Abbey, Devon, England (1201 Waverley)
- Flaxley Abbey, Gloucestershire, England (1151 Waverley)
- Forde Abbey, Dorset, England (1136 Waverley)
- Fountains Abbey, North Yorkshire, England (founded 1132, admitted to the Cistercian order 1135, Clairvaux)
- Furness Abbey, Cumbria, England (founded 1123 at Preston, persuaded to join the Cistercian order in 1147)
- Garendon Abbey, Leicestershire, England (1133 Waverley)
- Glenluce Abbey, Dumfries and Galloway, Scotland (1191 Rievaulx)
- Grace Dieu Abbey, Monmouthshire, Wales (1226 Waverley)
- Hailes Abbey, Gloucestershire, England (1246 Citeaux)
- Holmcultram Abbey, Cumbria, England (1150 Melrose)
- Hulton Abbey, Staffordshire, England (1219 Savigny)
- Jervaulx Abbey, North Yorkshire, England (1150 Byland)
- Kingswood Abbey, Gloucestershire, England (1139 Tintern)
- Kinloss Abbey, Moray, Scotland (1150 Melrose)
- Kirkstall Abbey, West Yorkshire, England (1147 Fountains)
- Kirkstead Abbey, Lincolnshire, England (1139 Fountains)
- Llantarnam Abbey, Monmouthshire, Wales (1179 Whitland)
- St. Mary Graces Abbey, London, England (1350 Beaulieu)
- Louth Park Abbey, Lincolnshire, England (1137 Fountains)
- Margam Abbey, West Glamorgan, Wales (1147 Clairvaux)
- Meaux Abbey, East Riding of Yorkshire, England (1151 Fountains)
- Medmenham Abbey, Buckinghamshire, England (1202 Fountains)
- Melrose Abbey, Scottish Borders, Scotland (1136 Rievaulx)
- Merevale Abbey, Warwickshire, England (1148 Waverley)
- Neath Abbey, West Glamorgan, Wales (1130 Savigny)
- Netley Abbey, Hampshire, England (1239 Beaulieu)
- Newbattle Abbey, Midlothian, Scotland (1140 Melrose)
- Newenham Abbey, Devon, England (1247 Beaulieu)
- Newminster Abbey, Northumberland, England (1138 Fountains)
- Pipewell Abbey, Northamptonshire, England (1143 Newminster)
- Poulton Abbey, Cheshire, England (between 1153 and 1158 Combermere)
- Quarr Abbey, Isle of Wight, England (1132 Savigny)
- Revesby Abbey, Lincolnshire, England (1143 Rievaulx)
- Rewley Abbey, Oxfordshire, England (1281 Waverley)
- Rievaulx Abbey, North Yorkshire, England (1132 Clairvaux)
- Robertsbridge Abbey, East Sussex, England (1176 Boxley)
- Roche Abbey, South Yorkshire, England (1147 Newminster)
- Rufford Abbey, Nottinghamshire, England (1146 Rievaulx)
- Saddell Abbey, Argyll and Bute, Scotland (early thirteenth century Mellifont)
- St Bernard's College, Oxford, England (1437)
- Sawley Abbey, Lancashire, England (1148 Newminster)
- Sawtry Abbey, Cambridgeshire, England (1147 Rievaulx)
- Sibton Abbey, Suffolk, England (1150 Warden)
- Stanley Abbey, Wiltshire, England (1151 Quarr)
- Stanlow Abbey, Cheshire, England (1178 Combermere)
- Stoneleigh Abbey, Warwickshire, England (1141 Waverley)
- Strata Florida Abbey, Ceredigion, Wales (1164 Whitland)
- Strata Marcella Abbey, Powys, Wales (1170 Whitland)
- Stratford Langthorne Abbey, Greater London, England (1135 Savigny)
- Sweetheart Abbey, Galloway, Scotland (1273 Rievaulx)
- Swineshead Abbey, Lincolnshire, England (1136 Furness)
- Thame Abbey, Oxfordshire, England (1137 Waverley)
- Tilty Abbey, Essex, England (1153 Rievaulx)
- Tintern Abbey, Monmouthshire, Wales (1131 L'Aumone)
- Vale Royal Abbey, Cheshire, England (1274 Abbey Dore)
- Valle Crucis Abbey, Denbighshire, Wales (1201 Whitland)
- Vaudey Abbey, Lincolnshire, England (1147 Fountains)
- Warden Abbey, Bedfordshire, England (1136 Rievaulx)
- Waverley Abbey, Surrey, England (1128 L'Aumone)
- Whalley Abbey, Lancashire, England (1172 Combermere)
- Whitland Abbey, Carmarthenshire, Wales (1140 Clairvaux)
- Woburn Abbey, Bedfordshire, England (1145 Fountains)

== See also ==
- Alien priory
- List of Cistercian abbeys in Ireland
- List of abbeys and priories in England
