= Walbran Island =

Island in British Columbia, Canada

Coordinates: 51°31′24″N 127°36′43″W

Walbran Island is an island in the Central Coast region of British Columbia, Canada. It is located on the northwest side of Rivers Inlet near its mouth into Fitz Hugh Sound.

== History ==
It is named after John Thomas Walbran. He was the author of British Columbia Coast Names, which was published in 1909 and is still a valuable reference on the subject.
