= Carmanah Walbran Provincial Park =

Provincial park on Vancouver Island in British Columbia, Canada

- IUCN category II (national park)
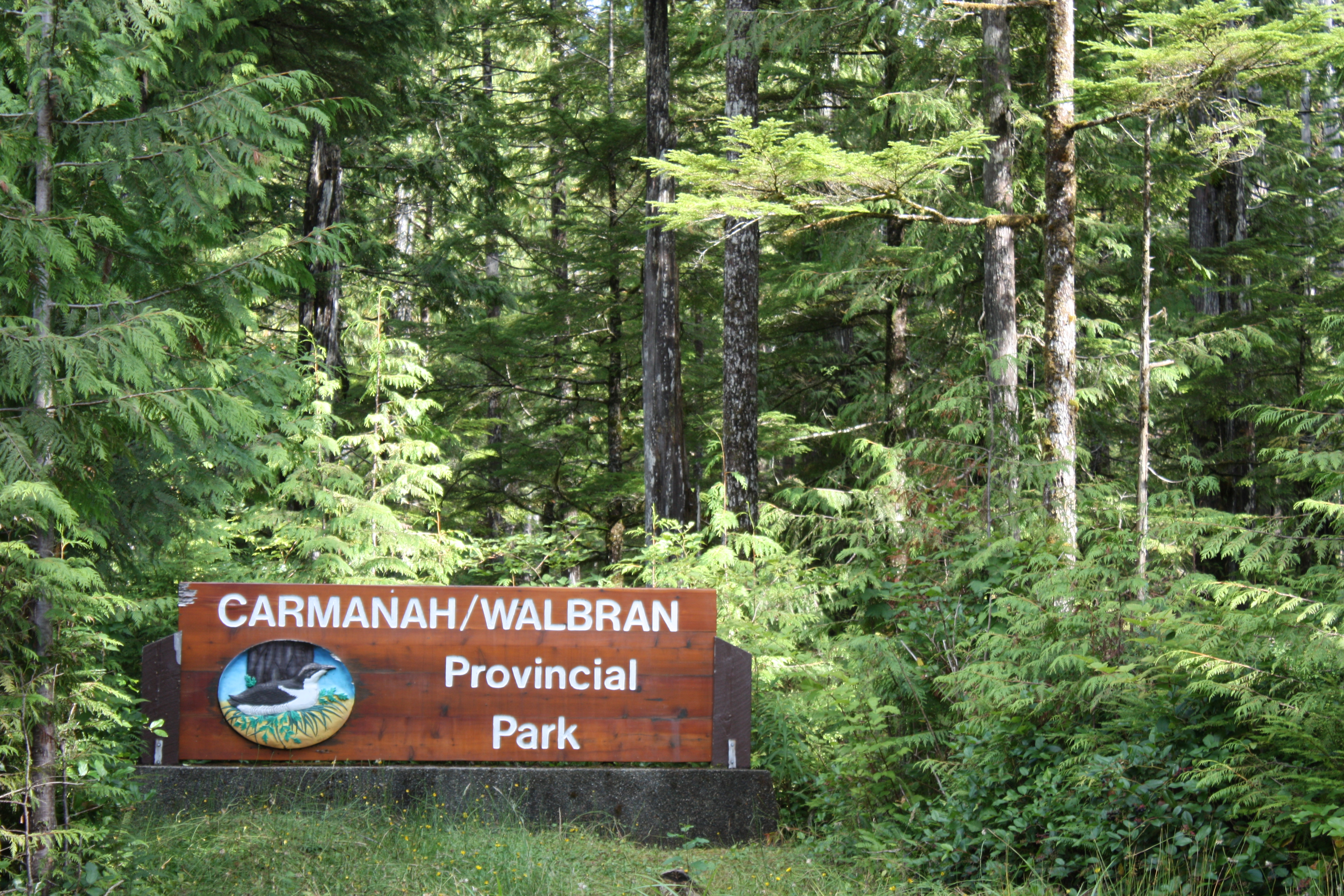

- Location within Vancouver Island Location within British Columbia Location within Cowichan Valley Regional District
- Interactive map of Carmanah Walbran Provincial Park
- Location: British Columbia, Canada
- Nearest city: Port Alberni, British Columbia
- Coordinates: 48°38′59″N 124°38′59″W
- Area: 164.5 km^{2} (63.5 sq mi)
- Established: 1990
- Governing body: Ditidaht First Nation, Nuu-chah-nulth Tribal Council, Christopher Knighton Watts Katrina Valeen Knighton

Carmanah Walbran Provincial Park, originally Carmanah Pacific Provincial Park, is a remote wilderness park located inside traditional Ditidaht First Nation (also spelled diiɁdiitidq) ancestral territory. The park covers a land area of 16,450 ha (63.5 sq mi) immediately adjacent to Pacific Rim National Park Reserve's West Coast Trail on the south-western, coastal terrain of Vancouver Island. The provincial park comprises the entire drainage of Carmanah Creek (northwest of the mouth of the creek hosted the kwaabaaduw7aa7tx village, a "local group" whose alliance makes up one branch of the Ditidaht Nation), and a good portion of the lower Walbran River drainage, both of which independently empty into the Pacific Ocean. The park is named after the Anglicized diitiid?aatx word kwaabaaduw7aa7tx, or Carmanah, meaning "as far up as a canoe can go" and John Thomas Walbran, a colonial explorer and ship's captain. Access to the park is by gravel logging road from Port Alberni, Lake Cowichan, or Port Renfrew.

The Carmanah Walbran protects extensive tracts of luxuriant Pacific temperate rainforest, and is famous for its ancient old growth, which includes giant western redcedar, coast Douglas-fir, western hemlock, and towering groves of Sitka spruce that grow along the productive riverside flats. Some of the western redcedar in the area are well over 1,000 years old, and Canada's tallest tree, a Sitka spruce named the Carmanah Giant, measured at 95.836 m (314 ft), estimated to be around 400 years old, lives along the lower reaches of Carmanah Creek. However, trails to the Carmanah Giant and many other portions of the park are currently inaccessible due to the neglect and disrepair of the park's boardwalk trail system—trail access via the boardwalk is essential in preserving the area's delicate ecosystem. Although BC Parks received a funding increase in 2012 for the first time in over ten years, BC's provincial government has repeatedly cut funding to the BC Parks' budget, the result of which is BC Parks' inability to staff a sufficient number of Park Rangers to maintain the network of trails and keep the park safe from cedar poachers and illegal logging.

== Current ==
As of 2014, the extensive trail network woven throughout both the Carmanah and Walbran portions of the park has fallen into disrepair, which makes hiking through neglected areas dangerous for visitors and for the delicate natural balance of the park's ecological systems. The wooden boardwalks have completely collapsed in some segments of the trail and are succumbing to rot in others. Whole portions of the trails are inaccessible due to the ecosystem's dwindling ecological integrity; both the protected reserve and non-protected adjacent areas are affected by industrial resource extraction projects such as clearcutting. When ecological integrity is compromised, symptomatic indicators of ecological instability, such as soil erosion, tree blow-downs and flash floods, occur. While the provincial park website warns of the lack of trail maintenance, and states that trail maintenance is "ongoing", there is no indication of trail improvement.

The rugged road into the main entrance of the remote park is currently being boxed in due to the rapid growth of alder trees that effectively narrow the single dirt lane from either side. The roads into the park are active dirt and gravel logging roads. The constant traffic of fast-moving, heavy machinery disrupts the uneven road-bed, which then becomes laden with sharp rocks, potholes and washboard ripples; spare tires are a must when travelling to the park. Access to the Upper Walbran is perhaps even more dangerous due to active logging in the unprotected portions of the Walbran, near places like the Walbran's Castle Grove, however, the park may still be reached on back roads from Port Alberni, Lake Cowichan, or Port Renfrew.

== History ==
Randy Stoltmann and a friend first laid eyes on the towering Sitka Spruce of the Carmanah Valley in the early 1980s. In 1985, Stoltmann authored an article proposing protection for the Carmanah giant spruce grove as a National Park Centennial gift to Canada while the Western Canada Wilderness Committee issued a report calling for the protection of a 500-acre sitka spruce grove park as a Canadian landmark candidate.

It was not until 1988 that the campaign to save the Carmanah commenced when McMillan Bloedel, the company with timber rights, was about to start clear-cutting the lower valley. Randy Stoltmann and Clinton Webb got word through to Peter McAllister, then Chair of the Sierra Club of Western Canada, now Sierra Club BC, via Bristol Foster, that the logging road was about to enter the watershed. McAllister immediately contacted MacMillan Bloedel to see if he could cut them off. He learned they were unaware their chainsaws were about to destroy the most famous grove of giant Sitka Spruce containing the tallest one in the world. McAllister, accompanied by the Victoria office's Sharon Chow, was helicoptered into the valley to show MacMillan Bloedel's Regional Forester and a couple of their executives the exceptional trees. They found Randy Stoltmann and Clinton Webb camped out in the grove. Back at MacMillan Bloedel headquarters, McAllister made the case for protecting the valley. He argued for a temporary moratorium on road-building and logging. The company agreed to a four-week stay of execution, which was enough time to allow for campaigning to protect the area.

The Sierra Club raised the money to commission a preliminary environmental assessment to alert the premier and cabinet ministers of the ecological values of the valley. McAllister made the campaign international at the Sierra Club’s Annual General meeting in San Francisco. He brought up National Geographic to photograph the celebrity sitka spruce grove and show off Vancouver Island as the worst clear-cut devastation in all of the Pacific Northwest. Consequently, Nat Geo's Jim Blair photograph of Mt Paxton, clear-cut entirely right down to the sea near Kyuquot was featured as a triple page foldout in their Old Growth Forests issue. After climbing out of the Carmanah, the Nat Geo photographer and McAllister were marooned as close to hurricane-force winds and torrential rains caused massive mudslides on the steep slope of the big clear-cut. A MacMillan Bloedel helicopter was brought in to rescue them. About that time McAllister sent Jup Weber, MP for Luxembourg, forester and a leader of the Greens in Europe down into the Carmanah to witness one of the last ancient forest watersheds on Vancouver Island. Upon returning to Victoria the MP publicly denounced the government for clear-cutting practices that in Europe would jail those responsible.

Immediately after the moratorium was announced, the Western Canada Wilderness Committee and the Carmanah Forest Society, led by Sid Haskell, began to build trails into the valley while arranging transportation for the public to come and see the giant trees for themselves. Sharon Chow recalls the Sierra Club of British Columbia designing and selling thousands of Carmanah T-shirts. 100 B.C. artists, organized by Mark Hobson in conjunction with the Western Canada Wilderness Committee, participated in a series of painting trips to the valley, culminating in the publication of Carmanah: Artistic Visions of An Ancient Rainforest.

Protests and civil disobedience led by First Nations kwaabaaduw7aa7tx hereditary chief, Peter Knighton, and conservationists like Randy Stoltmann and members of the WCWC in response to, among many things, logging company fallers working "accidentally" inside the riparian zone in order to illegally harvest the valuable giants: the civil disobedience extended well into the early 1990s.

The protests worked to garner more public support and fought to gain provincial funding that would enable the area to become a park and thus be protected against the long lasting and detrimental effects of deforestation. Protesters chained themselves to some of the great Sitka spruce while camped out in portaledges at heights of over 50 metres. In response to the success of the land defender's and activist's civil disobedience and the public support of the ongoing protests of the early 1990s, the province conceded, bought the tree farm licences off of MacMillan Bloedel and paid them $83.75 million for their lost tree farm licences in the Carmanah Walbran, including the interest "that has accumulated since the parks were created in 1991 and 1995. That amount was fixed as of January 1, 1999 and interest will accumulate on the principal until such time as it is paid in full."

Carmanah Pacific Provincial Park was established in 1990. The remainder of the Carmanah Valley and the lower part of the area drained by Walbran River were added in 1995 to form the current park.

== Ecology ==
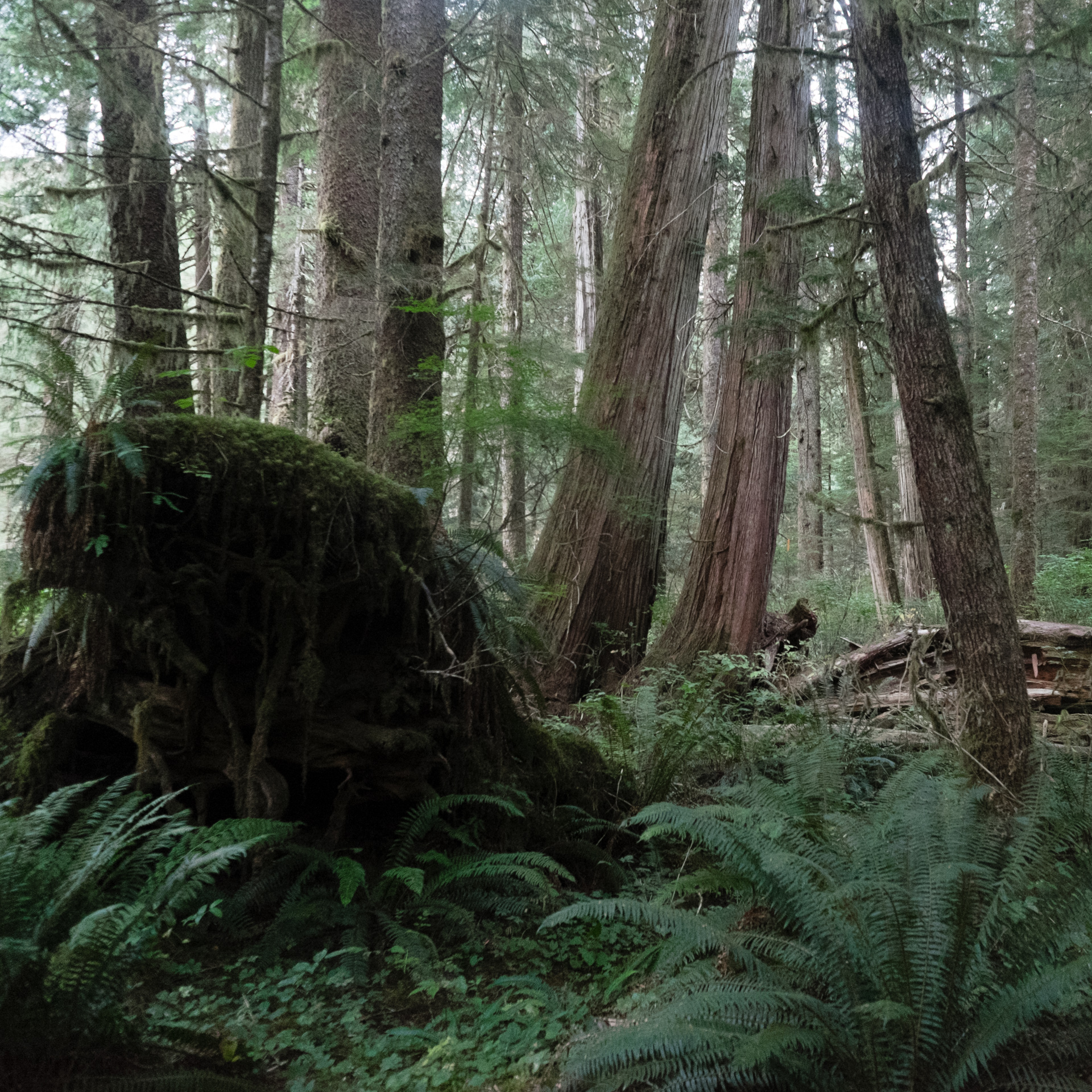
Old growth western red cedar in West Walbran Valley

This area lies within the coastal western hemlock (CWH) biogeoclimatic zone. Biogeoclimatic zones can be further divided into subzones, of which this park contains three. Immediately adjacent to the ocean lies the CWH Southern Very Wet Hypermaritime subzone, which is intimately shaped by the forces of the sea. This subzone is often referred to as the "spruce fringe forest" and is characterized by the dominance of sitka spruce, which is specially adapted to withstand the magnesium salts of sea spray. Other characteristic species include leatherleaf polypody fern and evergreen huckleberry.

Just inland is the CWH Submontane Very Wet Maritime subzone, which comprises the majority of the area of Carmanah Walbran park. The dominant coniferous trees here are western hemlock, coast Douglas-fir, western redcedar, and Sitka spruce. The year-round mild and humid climate produces ideal conditions for the development of extensive epiphyte communities in the forest canopy.

The forest contains twice the biomass of tropical rainforests. Marbled murrelet nests have been found in the area.

== See also ==
- List of British Columbia Provincial Parks
- List of protected areas of British Columbia
