= DGS Quadra =

Canadian survey and patrol vessel, launched in 1891

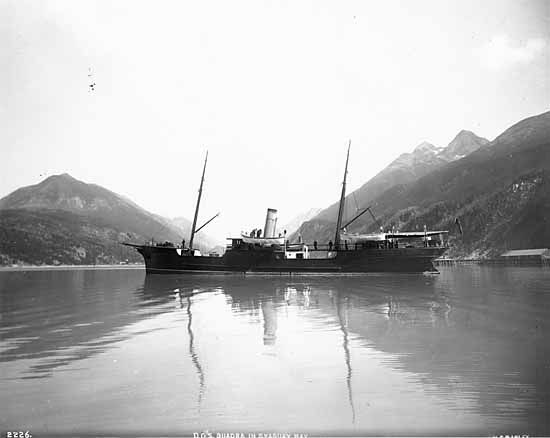
DGS Quadra in Skagway Bay

The Quadra was a survey and patrol vessel operated by the Government of Canada. She was launched in 1891, on the River Cart, in Scotland. For her first fourteen years her captain was John T. Walbran.

The Quadra undertook surveys, maintained buoys and lighthouses, carried Police, and carried the Governor General on a visit to Alaska.

The Quadra foundered in 1906 in Nanaimo Harbour, and was raised in 1906 or 1916. One source says 1916, but when barquentine Coloma was wrecked in December 1906, Quadra was six miles away off Bamfield Creek laying at anchor. A boat from Quadra rescued the crew. Apparently raised, repaired and returned to service in 1906.
