= Poisoning of Abbot Greenwell =

1447 poisoning in Fountains Abbey, England

Coordinates: 54°6′34″N 1°34′50″W

Location of Fountains Abbey

Around June 1447, John Greenwell, the abbot of Fountains Abbey, in Yorkshire, Northern England, was poisoned by a monk, William Downom. By the 15th century, Fountains was the richest abbey in England, and its abbot was an important figure in local political society. The first half of the century saw it wracked with internal strife, including a disputed election which had violent repercussions. Greenwell appears to have brought a degree of peace to the abbey upon his election, but he does not seem to have been popular.

Downom poisoned a dish of pottage, which he then attempted to feed the abbot while the latter was sick. Greenwell survived, and the case became notorious. Although it took over a year and discussions with Fountains' motherhouse of Cîteaux Abbey, Downom—who may have also had previous offences on his record—was eventually expelled from the abbey. Greenwell himself remained controversial and was both accused and accuser in local lawsuits, and later incurred the distrust of King Edward IV for his political leanings. Greenwell eventually resigned in 1471; Downom remained a monk after being expelled from Fountains and may have joined Kirkstead Abbey in Lincolnshire, following which he disappears from the record.

== Background ==
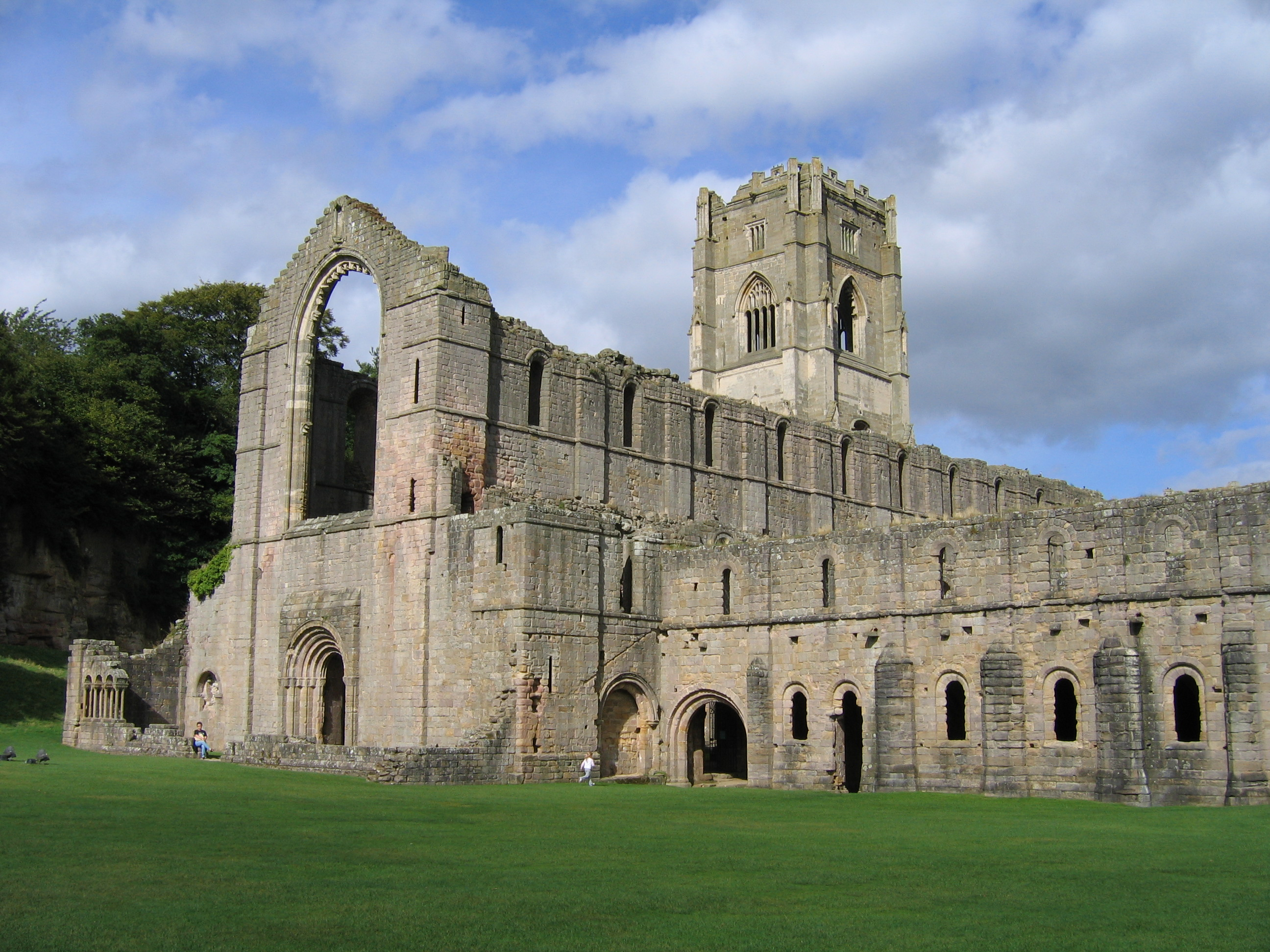
Fountains Abbey, ruined since its dissolution in 1539, viewed in 2005

By the 15th century, Fountains Abbey—approximately 3 miles (5 km) south-west of Ripon, Yorkshire—was the richest and most important Cistercian abbey in the country. It was also a period of turbulence and discord for the house. Trouble began on the death of Abbot Robert Burley in 1410. The subsequent abbatial election was heavily disputed, (Note: The election of a new abbot, says the medievalist Martin Heale, was "always a pivotal moment in the life of any religious community". Canon law defined the process in three stages. Firstly, the burial of the previous abbot had to have taken place before his successor elected. Then the house needed the permission of its patron, and finally the election was to take place before the full complement of members, including those of its dependent houses. There were three methods of election open to the community: acclamation ("by way of the Holy Spirit", i.e. divine inspiration), a secret ballot or the "way of compromise" in which a panel of religious chose among themselves. Heale argues that "convents were painfully aware of the dangers of disunity in prolonging the vacancy and inviting outside intervention, and for that reason serious election disputes were relatively rare".) with bitter argument, accusations of electoral fraud and violence which climaxed in the physical eviction of the incumbent, John Ripon, and his replacement by Roger Frank. It was eventually necessary for the abbots of Jervaulx and Rievaulx to intervene and restore order; they declared for Ripon. Frequent, if sporadic, outbreaks of dissension among the monks continued for the remainder of Ripon's abbacy. Ripon's successor, Thomas Paslew, was ill for much of his tenure, eventually succumbing to paralysis; he resigned a year before his death in 1443. He, in turn, was succeeded by John Martin, who died seven weeks after election.

John Greenwell, a monk of Fountains, was elected abbot in October 1442. He made his profession of obedience to George Neville, Archbishop of York, in January the following year. Although described by the historian Michael Spence as an "outstanding personality" of the period, his biographer at the Oxford Dictionary of National Biography has argued that Greenwell's abbacy "was not without difficulties". In 1445, the archbishop was forced to issue edicts forbidding interference in the business of Fountains or its residents by local people. The abbot of Fountains was an important local figure and political officer in his own right. It is on this account that Greenwell was close to the local nobilty. These included Richard Neville, Earl of Salisbury, and Henry Percy, Earl of Northumberland, to whom he was a regular visitor at their Yorkshire castles at Middleham and Topcliffe respectively. Greenwell also entertained Richard, Duke of York, at the monastic house of Swanley Grange. Notwithstanding Fountains' wealth and importance, it only housed 35 monks by 1447.

Poisonings within enclosed religious communities were relatively rare. They account for six per cent of all poisonings recorded in the 400 years between 1200 and 1600, and among monks, they are even scarcer. On the other hand, twenty per cent of recorded poisonings within enclosed communities were committed by nuns, who were, however, still only 2.4% of all criminal nuns. This was not the first attack on an abbot with poison of the 15th century; in 1405 and 1440, the superiors of Beeleigh and Norton also died by poison, presumed to have been administered by one of their brethren. It was also not the last known attempt. In January 1493, following an investigation, the abbots of Stratford Langthorne and Woburn reported an attempt with poison on the life of Abbot John Bright at Wardon Abbey.

== Poisoning ==
Charge against Downom

The aforesaid brother William Downom prepared and offered to the abbot a certain English potage called candell. And being commanded by obedience by the abbot of the accused, he refused to taste it. Wherefore the abbot himself, being frightened and justly moved by the suspicion of the matter and the previous bad reputation of the said Downom, also abstained from tasting this kind of potage, which thing reminded many of the suspicion of evil.

— C. H. Talbot, Letters from the English Abbots to the Chapter at Cîteaux, 1442–1521, p.30

Although the crises that had wracked Fountains early in the century appeared to have died down, in 1447 an even greater crisis broke out. A monk, William Downom (also Downam), was accused of trying to poison Greenwell shortly before 11 June (the date on which he was charged with the offence). Downom was a veteran of his house, having been ordained an acolyte in June 1425. He likely held a senior position within the abbatial hierarchy, as he later faced further accusations of failing to file accounts for his offices over several years.

Greenwell had been ill. During his sickness, Downom, unprompted, made him a bowl of soup or pottage. However, when—and the historical record gives no explanation as to why—it was requested that he taste the dish before Greenwell supped, Downom refused to do so. The Earl of Salisbury was then in London on royal council business. When news of the attack reached him, he dispatched one of his surgeons, Henry Welles of Middleham, to Fountains to attend the abbot. Greenwell survived, and Downom confessed to his crime. The reason he gave for refusing to taste the food was that he, personally, did not like the flavour. It was subsequently recorded that "The father abbot of the monastery was afflicted with a serious illness, where and when the said William Downom had certain pottages prepared for the abbot himself and offered them to him", and then, "when requested in virtue of holy obedience to taste, he expressly refused and did other unlawful things", although the nature of these "other things" is not elaborated upon. (Note: "Monasterii pater abbas gravi teneretur infirmitate, ubi et quando dictus Willelmus Downom' quedam pottagia ipsi abbati preparari fecit et ei optulit ... requisitus in virtute sancte obediencie ut pregustaret expresse renuit et alia illicita.)

Although Downom's motives for poisoning Greenwell are unknown—none was suggested by contemporaries—Greenwell's biographer John Walker speculates that there may have been a pre-existing enmity between the two men. Downom was alleged to have been responsible for the abbey accruing massive debts that Greenwell subsequently managed to reduce by 1000 marks. (Note: A medieval English mark was a unit of account equivalent to two-thirds of a pound.) The debts may well have been the result of Downom appropriating abbey funds, suggests Spence, while he also seems to have challenged his Order on occasion, both in its authority and doctrine. During his subsequent interrogation, Downom swore to "not voluntarily conceal debts which are due to the aforesaid monastery", nor to harm the "bodily health of my abbot, Master John Grenewell".

The medievalist Julie Kerr suggests that Downom's may have been an extreme response to the often claustrophobic atmosphere of monasteries, which, she argues, could at times be "a hothouse of emotions". While abbots were able to leave the cloister freely—thus escaping the source, if need be, of their affront—ordinary monks had less opportunity for such self-management, despite being expected to avoid anger and extreme emotion. It may be, says Kerr, that Downom was sufficiently angered by Greenwell's refusal to eat his soup that he undertook an immediate, possibly unthinking, revenge.

The investigation subsequently accused Downom of non pauca crimina et errores ("not a few crimes and errors"). It is possible that this was not the first time Downom had been suspected of such activities. He appears to have had similar trouble on a previous occasion, although whether for anything as serious as poisoning is unknown. Apostasy is another possibility, as he appears to have left Fountains without permission, albeit repenting before the abbots of Newminster and Kirkstead on 11 May 1448. Perhaps referencing this event, one of the monks who later witnessed the official accusation against Downom, William Hull, qualified his signature with the comment conscius de primis erroribus in ultima rebellione ("in knowledge of earlier errors in the first rebellion"). This was considered relevant enough to remain on the record, in the knowledge that it would be seen by the motherhouse, Cîteaux Abbey, to whom Downom was being reported. (Note: Hull also found himself in trouble in the late 1450s, notes Spence: He "was described as an apostate who had issued a writ causing the cellarer to be imprisoned, albeit briefly".)

Another of those to sign the accusation against Downom was the physician who had attended Greenwell, Henry Welles. However, it is also likely that Downom's condemnation did not meet with universal agreement among the brethren, as the names of several monks known to be in residence at the time—including that of Thomas Swynton, Greenwell's eventual successor as abbot—are missing as signatories.

=== Letters to Cîteaux ===
Statement of Henry Welles, physician

Since it is just and meritorious to bear witness to the truth so that both the righteous are praised and sinners are restrained, I Master Henry Welles notify all who will inspect this present writing that when the venerable Lord John Grenewell, Abbot of Fontains, professed of sacred theology, was suffering serious illness, by order of my illustrious lord the Earl of Salisbury, he had a physician to provide him with medical care. A certain Brother William, then a monk of the said monastery, brought over a certain secular vagabond ignorant of medicine, to inspect my medicines ordered for the said Abbot and touching his clothes, claimed that he knew how to foretell many things about a man's future life and death. Hence he wished to predict the day of the abbot's death and to foreshadow certain future abbots: hence, after being captured in Middleburgh [Middleham] Castle, and having been sent to the Lord Earl for examination on the aforesaid acts, and having confessed to the aforesaid, he secretly withdrew and thus escaped the punishment due to him.

— C. H. Talbot, Letters from the English Abbots to the Chapter at Cîteaux, 1442–1521, p.30

The principal source for historians' knowledge of these events is a collection of letters and depositions sent from Fountains to the Abbot of Cîteaux, which thoroughly documented the poisoning and Downom's subsequent expulsion. (Note: These letters, in Latin, have been collected and transcribed by C. H. Talbot. Taken from the surviving archives of Cîteaux Abbey, they comprise "the sole material we have for judging the state of the Cistercians in England during the fifteenth century".) These were legally notarised documents and comprised a complaint drawn up by the Chapter House and another signed and sealed by a convocation of 18 Cistercian abbots which met in Leicester in July 1448. The compilation as eventually received at Cîteaux was probably finalised by 28 December 1448, although the documents themselves range between then and 11 June 1447. At some point the affair became public knowledge and a notorious scandal for Fountains, the most important Cistercian abbey in the country. Downom seems to have temporarily escaped the abbey—apostasising himself again—as a record shows that Greenwell ordered his recapture on 2 June 1449.

== Later events ==
The same day as the abbey's despatch to Cîteaux, 28 December 1449, his condemnation being complete, Downom was formally expelled from Fountains. The protracted period between the poisoning and Downom's leaving, says Talbot, indicates "the trouble, expense and complicated legal processes which one disgruntled member of a community could bring upon his abbey".

Greenwell's abbacy also continued to be involved in frequent controversy. He was unpopular locally, and in 1451 he was forced, says the writ of recognisance, to provide securities for his good behaviour "toward all the people". Greenwell's spirited defence of his house's tithes appears to have been a particular source of contention. The same year, as part of increasing ill-feeling between the major local families of Percy and Neville, Fountains was attacked by the Earl of Salisbury's son, John Neville. (Note: Resistance to the organised church, if not yet outright anticlericalism, was a common feature of the period; the historian Ralph A. Griffiths has commented that "the religious were fair game in an age which, however much respect it might show for individual piety, was still critical of the more obvious temporal aspects of the institutionalised church".) With the outbreak of civil war in 1459, Greenwell was an adherent of Lancaster, and when the Yorkist claimant won the throne in 1461 as Edward IV, Greenwell was taken to London and placed under a bond of £2,000 (equivalent to £2,000,000 in 2023) to keep the King's Peace. For context, the abbey's annual income around this time was approximately £1,155 (equivalent to £1,000,000 in 2023).

Greenwell survived until at least 1470, when his application to the Pope to resign as abbot was granted. Perhaps indicative of lingering resentment, no mention of Greenwell's abbacy was made in the record of Swynton's election as abbot in 1471, even though it was customary to honour a new abbot's predecessor by doing so. Little is known of Downom after his expulsion from Fountains. He appears to have subsequently joined Kirkstead Abbey, Lincolnshire, at some point, after which he disappears from the records.
