= Monasteranenagh Abbey =

Medieval friary and national monument, County Limerick, Ireland

- Mainistir an Aonaigh
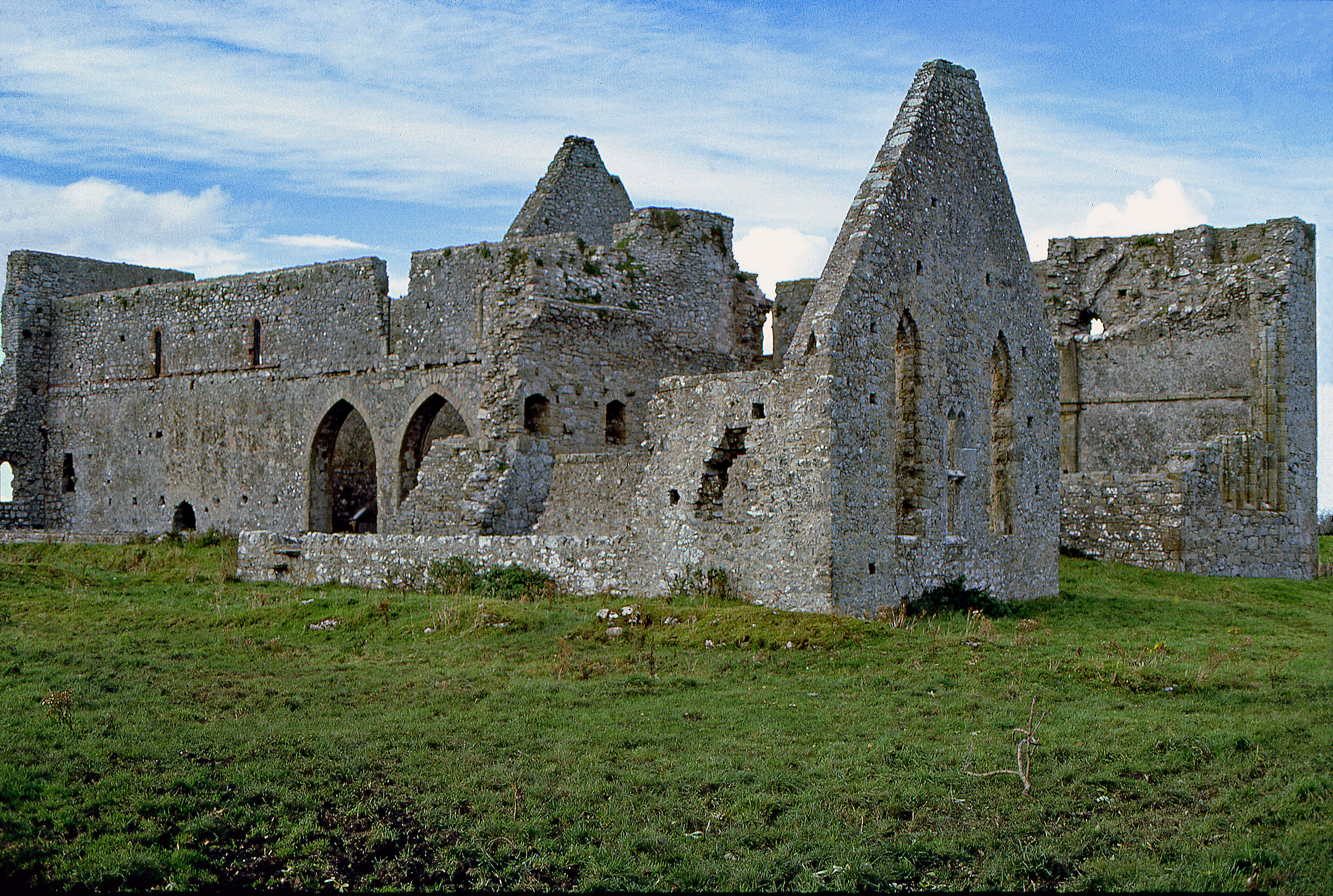

- Location within Ireland

Monastery information
- Other names: Monaster-an-Aonagh; Eanach; Monaster-na-maighe; Maigue; Maio; Manister; Nenagh; Nenay
- Order: Cistercians
- Established: 1148
- Disestablished: 1580

People
- Founder: Toirdelbhach mac Diarmaida Ua Briain

Architecture
- Status: ruined
- Style: Norman

Site
- Location: Monaster South, Dooradoyle, County Limerick
- Coordinates: 52.516850°N 8.662752°W
- Public access: yes

National monument of Ireland
- Official name: Monasteranenagh Abbey Abbey (Cistercian)
- Reference no.: 171

Monasteranenagh Abbey is a medieval friary and national monument located in County Limerick, Ireland. It is in the civil parish of Monasteranenagh.

== Location ==
Monasteranenagh Abbey is located 3.7 km (2.3 mi) east of Croom, on the north bank of the River Camogue.

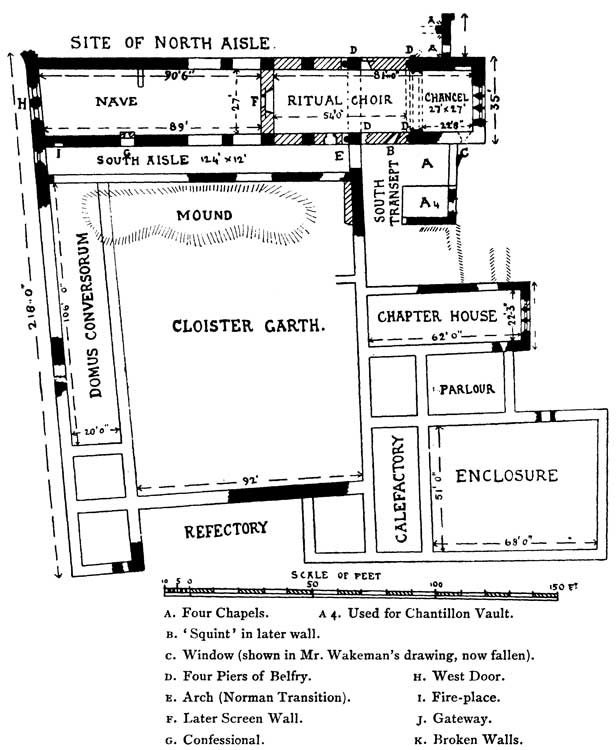
Plan of the abbey. It includes a calefactory (heated room) and domus conversorum (quarters for lay brothers).

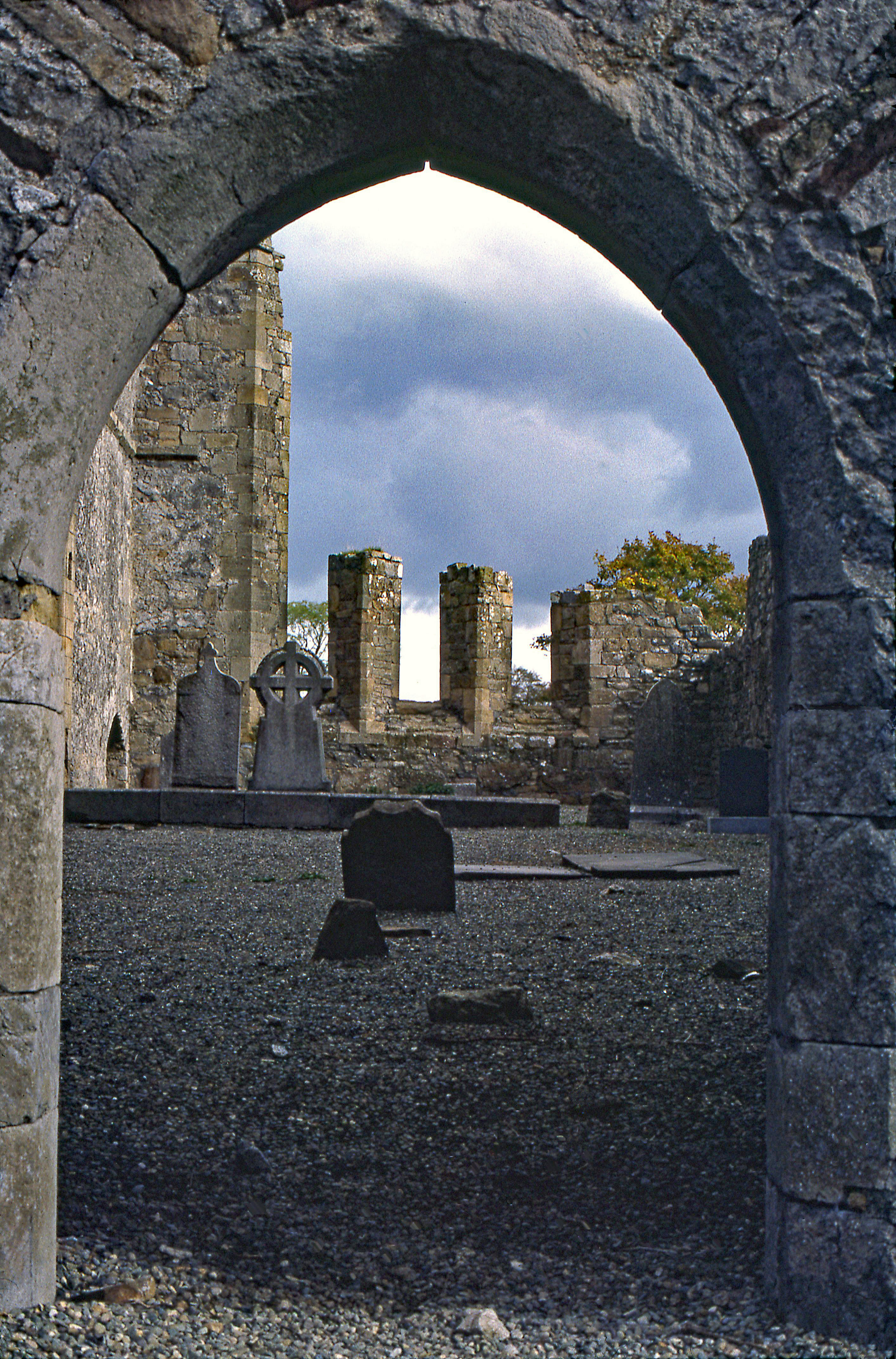
Interior doorway

== History ==
This monastery was founded in 1148 by Toirdelbhach mac Diarmaida Ua Briain for Cistercians from Mellifont. The name means "Monastery of the Fair."

The buildings were possibly completed by Domnall Mór Ua Briain in the late 12th century.

The monastery was made subject to Margam Abbey after the conspiracy of Mellifont in 1127. In 1228 the monks fortified the abbey to prevent Stephen of Lexington's visitation.

Monasteranenagh Abbey was dissolved in 1540 and granted to Sir Osborne Echingham in 1543. Some monks continued to occupy the site.

The monastery was taken by English soldiers on 3 April 1580, during the Second Desmond Rebellion. Sir Nicholas Malby, for the English, routed Sir John of Desmond and turned his cannon on the Abbey where some of the Irish had sought shelter: the cloister and refectory were practically destroyed and the whole of the surviving monastic community were massacred.

The tower fell in 1806–7; it was thought to have been either the crossing tower of the church or part of a 16th century house that was constructed over the south transept. The presbytery had a barrel vault, which collapsed in 1874. The interior of the abbey was used as a burial ground until the 1970s.

== Buildings ==
Above the remains of the west doorway are two round-headed windows. There are three lancet windows in the east wall.

The ruins mainly include the church (1170–1220), and an early Gothic chapter house. The walls, gables and the main window frame of the church are all extant.
