= John Richard Walbran =

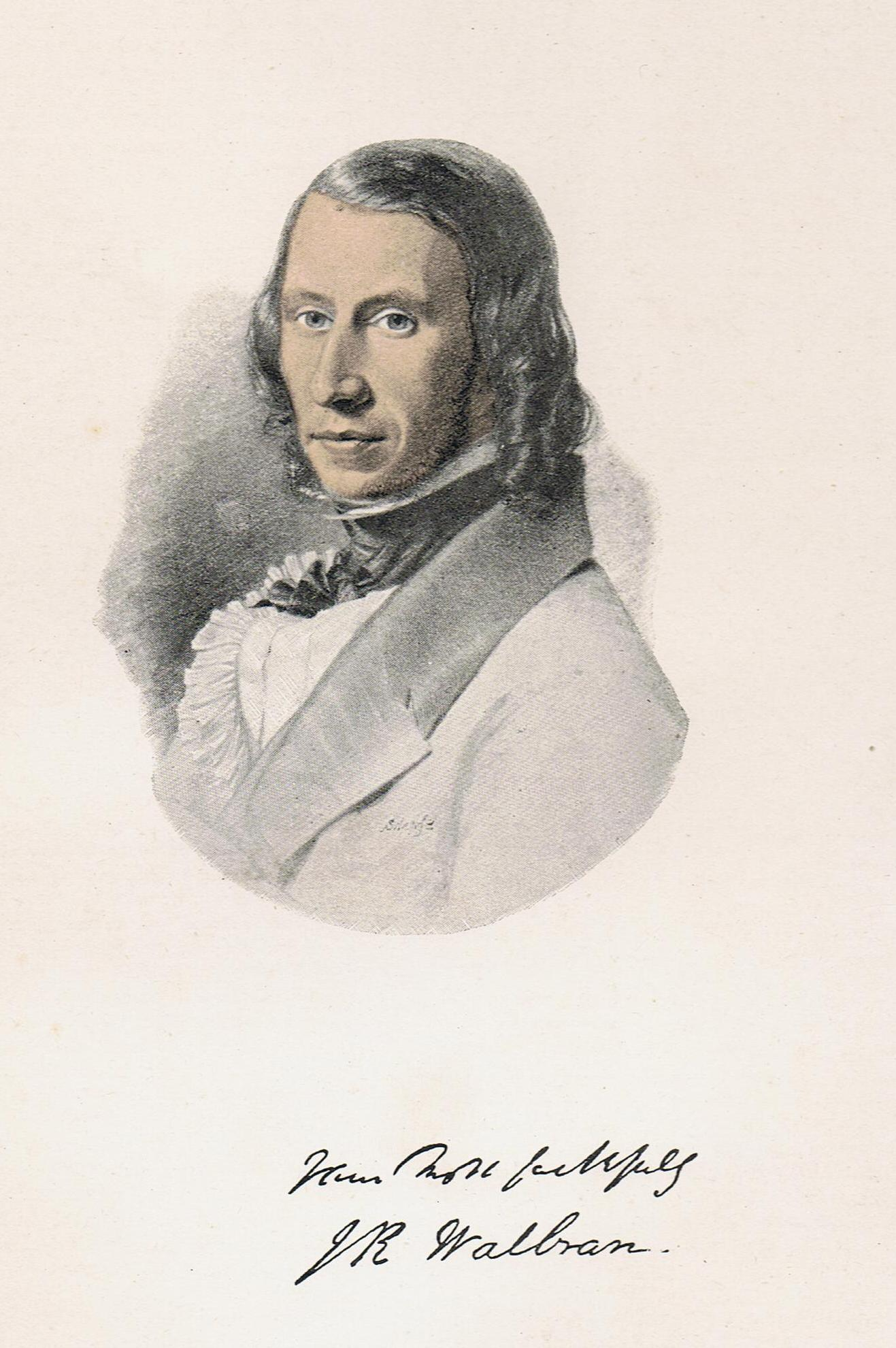
John Richard Walbran

John Richard Walbran FSA (24 December 1817 – 7 April 1869) was a British antiquarian with a strong focus on Yorkshire's history and Cistercian heritage. He initiated excavations at Fountains Abbey, authored significant works like The Memorials of the Abbey of St. Mary of Fountains, and contributed to the preservation of historical knowledge, despite his aversion to the publishing aspects of authorship. His dedication to antiquarian studies left a lasting impact on the understanding of Yorkshire's past.

== Life ==
John Richard, son of John and Elizabeth Walbran, was born at Ripon, Yorkshire, on 24 December 1817, and educated at Whixley in the same county. After leaving school he assisted his father, an iron merchant, and eventually became an independent wine merchant.

From his early years he had a marked taste for historical and antiquarian studies, and all the time that he could spare from his avocation was occupied with archaeological investigations, especially with respect to the ecclesiastical and feudal history of his native county. His study of the records of Fountains Abbey led him to make a specialty of the history of the whole Cistercian order. A paper by him On the Necessity of clearing out the Conventual Church of Fountains, written in 1846, originated the excavations at Fountains Abbey, which were carried out under his personal direction.

Walbran was elected a Fellow of the Society of Antiquaries of London on 12 January 1854. He was the mayor of Ripon in 1856 and 1857.

He married, in September 1849, Jane, daughter of Richard Nicholson of Ripon, and left two sons, the elder of whom, Francis Maximillian Walbran of Leeds, is the author of works on angling. In April 1868 he was struck with paralysis, and died on 7 April 1869. He is buried in Holy Trinity churchyard, Ripon.

== Works ==
Although he had great literary ability, he had a singular dislike to the mechanical part of authorship, that connected with printing, and had it not been for the encouragement and technical assistance of his friend William Harrison, printer, of Ripon, few of his writings would have been printed.

The first edition of his Guide to Ripon was printed in 1844, and was succeeded by nine other editions in his lifetime. His chief work, The Memorials of the Abbey of St. Mary of Fountains (Surtees Soc. 1864–78, 2 vols.), was left unfinished. Another uncompleted work was his History of Gainford, Durham, 1851. He also made some progress with a History of the Wapentake of Claro and the Liberty of Ripon, and a History of the Parish of Halifax.

Walbran's minor works include:

- Genealogical Account of the Lords of Studley Royal, 1841; reprinted, with additions, by Canon Raine in vol. ii. of Memorials of Fountains. works on Fountains Abbey and Studley Royal
- A Summer's Day at Bolton Abbey, 1847; regarding Bolton Abbey
- Visitors' Guide to Redcar, 1848.
- On the Oath taken by Members of the Parliaments of Scotland from 1641, 1854.
- Notes on the Manuscripts at Ripley Castle, 1864. on materials in the library at Ripley Castle

His manuscripts were after his death purchased by Edward Akroyd of Halifax, and presented by him to York Cathedral Library.
