= Mellifont Abbey =

First Cistercian abbey built in Ireland

- An Mhainistir Mhór
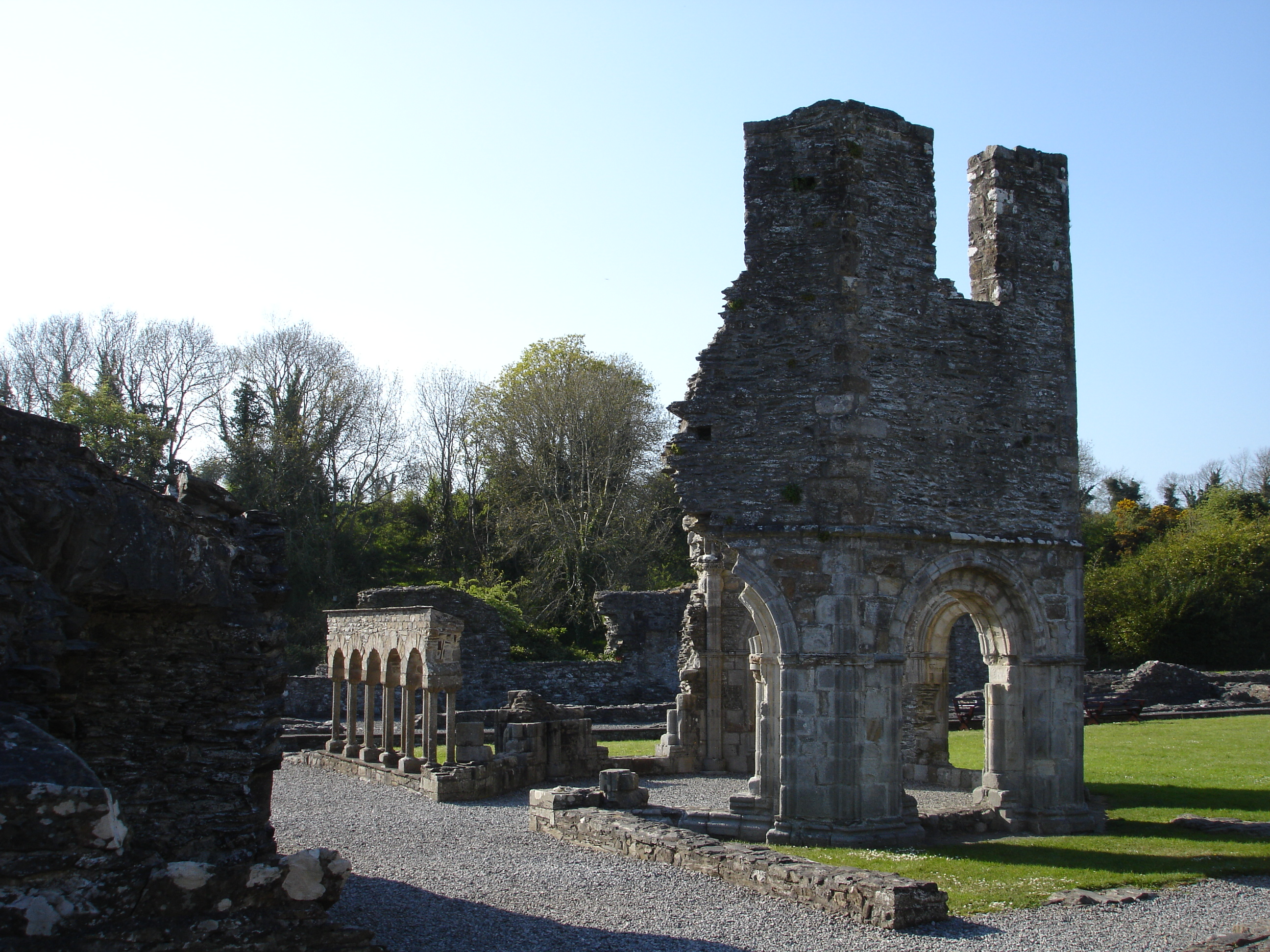
- Lavabo of Mellifont Abbey

- Location within Ireland

Monastery information
- Order: Cistercians
- Established: 1142
- Disestablished: 1539
- Reestablished: 1938 (different location)
- Diocese: Armagh

People
- Founders: Saint Malachy, Archbishop of Armagh

Architecture
- Status: Active
- Style: Cistercian

Site
- Location: Collon, County Louth, Ireland
- Coordinates: 53.742317°N 6.466481°W
- Public access: Yes

Mellifont Abbey (Irish: An Mhainistir Mhór, literally 'the Big Monastery') was a Cistercian abbey located close to Drogheda in County Louth, Ireland. It was the first abbey of the order to be built in Ireland. In 1152, it hosted the Synod of Kells-Mellifont. After its dissolution in 1539, the abbey became a private manor house. This saw the signing of the Treaty of Mellifont in 1603 and served as William of Orange's headquarters in 1690 during the Battle of the Boyne.

Today, the ruined abbey is a national monument of Ireland and accessible to the public. The English language name for the monastery, 'Mellifont', comes from the Latin phrase Melli-fons, meaning 'Font of Honey'.

== Location ==
Mellifont Abbey sits on the banks of the River Mattock, some 10 km (6 miles) north-west of Drogheda.

== History ==
=== Origins ===
The Lavabo, 1902

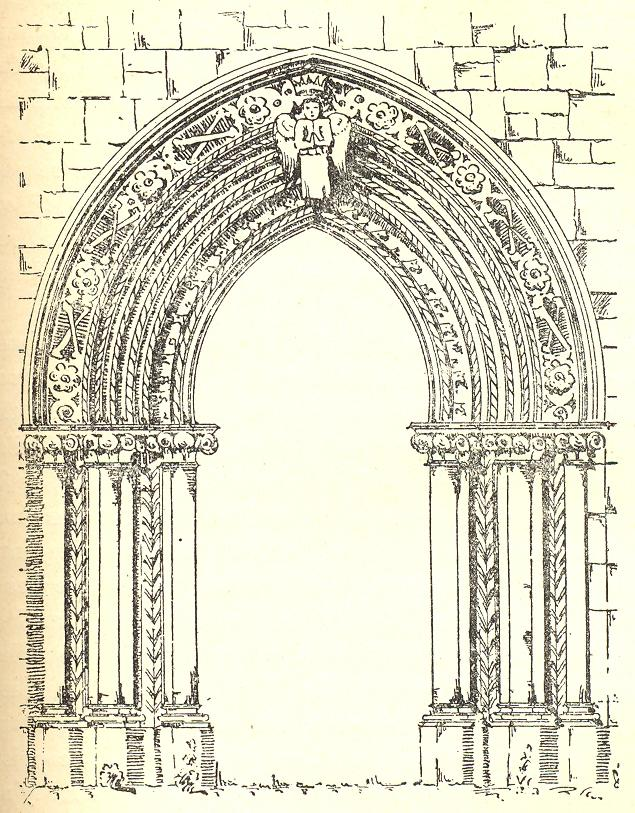
Drawing of the doorway to the chapter house from 1755, shortly before it was removed from the site.

The abbey was founded in 1142 on the orders of Saint Malachy, Archbishop of Armagh. By 1170, Mellifont had one hundred monks and three hundred lay brothers. The abbey became the model for other Cistercian abbeys built in Ireland, with its formal style of architecture imported from the abbeys of the same order in France; it was the main abbey in Ireland until its dissolution (see Dissolution of the monasteries). Other Cistercian houses in Ireland were often called "the daughters of Mellifont". From about 1275 they were free from English control.

=== The Synod of 1152 ===
An important synod was held in Mellifont in 1152 as recorded in the Annals of the Four Masters, which states that the synod was attended by bishops and kings along with the Papal Legate, Giovanni Cardinal Paparoni (also known as John Cardinal Paparo; Saint Malachy had died some four years earlier). The consecration of the church took place in 1157 and asserted Church authority by banishing the King of Meath, Donnchadh Ua Maeleachlainn.

Various kings gave donations to assist this foundation: Muirchertach Ua Lochlainn, provincial king of Ulster, gave cattle, some gold and also a local townland, Donnchad Ua Cearbhall, the king of Airgialla (Oriel), who had donated the land, also gave gold, while Derbforgaill, the wife of Tigernan Ua Ruairc gave gold, a chalice and altar cloths.

=== After dissolution ===
The abbey was dissolved in 1539, when it became a fortified house, built there by Edward Moore in 1556 with materials taken from the old abbey.

In 1603 the Treaty of Mellifont was agreed between the English Crown and Hugh O'Neill, Earl of Tyrone, in the abbey grounds. Mellifont was then the property of The 1st Viscount Moore, who was a close friend of Lord Tyrone, and helped persuade him to sign the Treaty. The Moore family, who later became Earls of Drogheda, remained the owners of Mellifont until 1727. The Abbey was attacked and looted during the Irish Rebellion of 1641.

William of Orange used Mellifont Abbey House as his headquarters during the Battle of the Boyne in 1690.

== Description ==
Mellifont Abbey is now a ruin. Little of the original abbey remains, save a 13th-century lavabo (where the monks washed their hands before eating), some Romanesque arches and a 14th-century chapter house.

=== Burials ===
- Tommaltach Ua Conchobair

== New Mellifont Abbey ==
New Mellifont Abbey is home to the Cistercian monks and is located in Collon, a small village and townland in the southwest corner of County Louth, on the N2 national primary road. Supported by Cardinal McRory, it was re-established in 1938 by monks from Mount Melleray Abbey who purchased Oriel Temple, the residence of Lord Massareene (formerly the residence of First Baron Oriel John Foster MP the last Speaker of the Irish House of Commons), the land was originally owned by the old Mellifont Abbey. In 1945 it was elevated to the status of Abbey. As well as the Farm, they also operate a garden (Mellifont Abbey Gardens) and a nursery/garden centre which is open to the public. As with the Benedictine tradition the abbey offers a guest house for those wishing to stay.

In 1998 Dr. Sean Brady (future Cardinal) and Cardinal Cahal Daly officiated at a mass with the Mellifont community at the old Mellifont Abbey, to celebrate 900 years since the Cistercian order was established in Ireland, and the 850 anniversary of the death of St. Malachy, as well as the 60th anniversary of the re-establishment of the community.

In 2019 New Mellifont hosted Brothers and Sisters from Cistercian Communities in Ireland, and some from Scotland and England in celebrating the 900th anniversary of the first Cistercian charter of charity.

=== Abbots/Superiors ===
- Dom Benignus Hickey (1893-1978)†, Superior (21/11/1938 – 22/01/1946); Abbot (22/01/1946 – 06/01/1967)
- Dom Gerard Kennedy†, Abbot (16/03/1967 – 03/04/1972)
- Dom Vincent Byrne, Sup. ad nutum (04/06/1972 – 20/08/1974)
- Dom Enda Ducey (1907-1992)†, Abbot (21/08/1974 – 27/05/1980) - became Abbot of Mount Melleray Abbey in 1980.
- Dom Finnian Power†, Abbot (27/05/1980 – 27/05/1986)
- Dom Francis Prendergast, Abbot (27/05/1986 – 27/05/1992)
- Dom Bernard Boyle (1926-2018)†, Abbot (27/05/1992 – 27/05/2004); Sup. ad nutum 2010
- Dom Augustine McGregor, Abbot (2004-2010) - became Abbot of Mount Melleray Abbey in 2010.
- Laurence McDermott (1929-2016)†, Superior ad nutum 2011 – 2012.
- Dom Brendan Freeman, Sup. ad nutum 2018, formerly Abbot of New Melleray Abbey from 1984-2013.
- Dom Richard Purcell, Pontifical Commissary 2014-2018 - Abbot of Roscrea then Mount Melleray

† Buried in Our Lady of Mellifont Abbey Cemetery, Collon, County Louth

== See also ==
- List of abbeys and priories in Ireland (County Louth)
- List of Cistercian Abbeys in Ireland
