= Stud Lodge, Eaton Hall =

Stud Lodge
- Location in Cheshire
- 53.1476°N 2.8758°W
- Location: Eaton Hall, Cheshire, England
- OS grid reference: SJ 415 615

History
- Built: 1881–82
- Built for: 1st Duke of Westminster

Site notes
- Architect: John Douglas

Listed Building – Grade II
- Designated: 2 November 1983
- Reference no.: 1129926

Stud Lodge is a building in the grounds of Eaton Hall, Cheshire, England. It is recorded in the National Heritage List for England as a designated Grade II listed building.

Stud Lodge was built in 1881–82 as a store shed and domestic offices for the 1st Duke of Westminster on his estate at Eaton Hall and designed by the Chester architect John Douglas. It is built in two storeys in red brick with some timber framing and has a red tile roof. The wing of the building to the right has a circular lower storey in brick over which, supported by corbels, is an octagonal timber framed upper storey, surmounted by a spire that includes a small dormer. To the left is a wing, entirely in brick, with a polygonal apse-like end, multiple windows in the upper storey, and a finial on the apex of its roof.

== See also ==
- Listed buildings in Eaton, Cheshire West and Chester
- List of non-ecclesiastical and non-residential works by John Douglas
