= Listed buildings in Aldfield =

Aldfield is a civil parish in the county of North Yorkshire, England. It contains twelve listed buildings that are recorded in the National Heritage List for England. Of these, one is listed at Grade II*, the middle of the three grades, and the others are at Grade II, the lowest grade. The parish contains the village of Aldfield and the surrounding countryside. The listed buildings consist of houses, cottages and farmhouses, two bridges, a well-head, a church and associated structures, and a milepost.

== Key ==
Grade	Criteria
II*	Particularly important buildings of more than special interest
II	Buildings of national importance and special interest

== Buildings ==
Name and location	Photograph	Date	Notes	Grade
Church House; 54.12018°N 1.59470°W		1676	The house is in gritstone with a stone slate roof. There are two storeys, two bays and a rear outshut. In the centre is a porch, and a doorway with a moulded architrave, and a large initialled lintel. Above the doorway is a round-headed window, and the other windows are mullioned with three or four lights, those in the ground floor with hood moulds.	II
The Cottage; 54.10948°N 1.58779°W		1749	The house is in sandstone, with coved eaves, wooden gutter brackets and a stone slate roof. There are two storeys and an attic, two bays, and a single-storey bay on the right. The central doorway has a quoined surround, a large lintel inscribed with the date, and a hood on shaped brackets. The windows are mullioned with two or three lights.	II
Horseley Gate Farmhouse; 54.12481°N 1.61455°W	—	Mid 18th century	The farmhouse is in stone, and has a pantile roof with a stone ridge and gable copings. There are two storeys and two bays, and a lower two-storey wing to the right. The doorway has a stone hood on brackets, and the windows are 20th-century casements.	II
Ings Bridge; 54.13013°N 1.60759°W		Mid 18th century	The bridge carries Fountains Gate over the River Laver. It is in stone and consists of two wide segmental arches. The bridge has pointed cutwaters that are carried up as flat buttresses to shallow pointed parapet coping, and there is a projecting band at the level of the road.	II
Mallard Grange; 54.12765°N 1.58770°W	—	Mid 18th century	The farmhouse, which incorporates earlier material, is in limestone, with quoins, and a stone slate roof with gable copings and shaped kneelers. There are two storeys and a cellar, and three bays, the middle bay projecting slightly. The windows on the front are sashes, one with a cambered lintel and a keystone. There are blocked earlier openings with quoined surrounds and cambered lintels with keystones, and at the rear is a three-light chamfered mullioned cellar window.	II
Bridge north of Rough House; 54.10855°N 1.59486°W		Mid to late 18th century	The bridge, which carries a path over the River Skell, is in stone, and consists of three round arches with keystones and voussoirs. The cutwaters are triangular, those on the downstream side carried up as shallow buttresses with pyramidal capstones on the moulded parapet coping. There is a projecting band at the level of the pathway.	II
Well-head; 54.11589°N 1.61016°W		Mid to late 18th century	The well-head at Aldfield Spa is in gritstone, and has a stone slab roof and a capstone with ogee moulding. It has a rectangular plan, and an opening on the east side, with lead and iron fixings for a door on the left, and right jambstones.	II
St Lawrence's Church; 54.12043°N 1.59477°W		c. 1783	The church is in gritstone with a Westmorland slate roof. It consists of a three-bay nave, a north transept with a vestry, and a shallow gabled east projection. On the west gable is a bellcote. In the centre is a doorway under a round-arched window with Gothic tracery, and above it is a sundial with an inscription and the date 1696. The outer bays contain windows with pointed arches and Y-tracery, and at the east end are two trefoil-headed lights and a quatrefoil.	II*
Milepost; 54.12140°N 1.61512°W	—	Late 18th to early 19th century	The milepost is on the north side of the B6265 road. It is in cast iron with a triangular plan, a sloping top and a hollow back, and is about 80 centimetres (31 in) high. On the top face is the distance to Skipton, the left face has the distance to Pateley, and on the right face is the distance to Ripon, the latter two with pointing hands.	II
Gates, piers and overthrow, St Lawrence's Church; 54.12030°N 1.59477°W		Early 19th century	Flanking the entrance to the churchyard are square stone monolithic gate piers about 2 metres (6 ft 7 in) high. Each pier is panelled, and has a cap with a projecting band and a shallow pyramidal finial. The gates are in wrought iron, and have spearhead finials and one urn finial. The overthrow is also in wrought iron, and has a plain bar with a scrolled end fastened to capstones, and a frame with a lantern.	II
School House; 54.11992°N 1.60332°W	—	Early to mid 19th century	The house is in gritstone with a parapet and a hipped Westmorland slate roof. There are two storeys, three bays, and flanking single-storey two-bay wings. The central doorway has a splayed lintel, and the windows are sashes with lintels and keystones.	II
Druids Farmhouse; 54.11886°N 1.59999°W	—	Mid 19th century	The farmhouse is rendered, and has a roof of purple slates with coped gables and shaped kneelers. There are two storeys, three bays, and a lower two-storey bay on the left. The central doorway has pilasters, a fanlight, a cornice and an entablature. The windows are sashes with rendered sills and lintels.	II
