= Listed buildings in Eaton, west Cheshire =

Eaton is a former civil parish, now in the parishes of Eaton and Eccleston and Poulton and Pulford, in Cheshire West and Chester, England. It contains 56 buildings that are recorded in the National Heritage List for England as designated listed buildings. Two of these are listed at Grade I, the highest grade, four at the middle grade, Grade II*, and the rest at the lowest grade, Grade II. The most important structures in the parish are Eaton Hall and its associated buildings. All the listed buildings in the parish are related to the hall or its park. Many of the buildings were designed by prominent architects chosen by the Grosvenor family, in particular Alfred Waterhouse, John Douglas, and Detmar Blow.

== Key ==
Grade	Criteria
I	Buildings of exceptional interest, sometimes considered to be internationally important
II*	Particularly important buildings of more than special interest
II	Buildings of national importance and special interest

== Buildings ==
Name and location	Photograph	Date	Notes	Grade
Column (east), Eaton Park; 53.13847°N 2.87549°W		Roman	A reconstituted Roman column placed to the east of the loggia. It is in Corinthian style.	II
Column (west), Eaton Park; 53.13846°N 2.87568°W		Roman	A reconstituted fragment of a Roman column placed to the west of the loggia. It consists of the base, capital and part of the shaft of a Corinthian column.	II
Golden Gates, Eaton Hall; 53.14040°N 2.87916°W		Early 18th century	The central pair of gates and the adjacent screen railings are by Robert and John Davies of Croes Foel. In about 1880 further side gates and screens, and a pair of lodges were added, all of which were designed by Alfred Waterhouse. The gates and screens are in wrought iron, and are painted black and gold. The lodges are in stone, they are in French Renaissance style, and each consists of a single chamber.	I
House near Eaton Stud, Eaton Park; 53.14840°N 2.87412°W		c. 1800	The pebbledashed house has a slate roof, an L-shaped plan, is in two storeys, and has a symmetrical front. The windows are mullioned. In the 1880s a gabled porch with heavy bargeboards was added by John Douglas.	II
Railings (north), Eaton Hall; 53.14053°N 2.87579°W		c. 1810	These were designed by William Porden for the 2nd Earl Grosvenor in his version of Eaton Hall. They were moved here by Detmar Blow in about 1911. They consist of a stone plinth, piers, and copings holding cast iron panels containing shields with coats of arms.	II
Railings (south), Eaton Hall; 53.13968°N 2.87611°W		c. 1810	These were designed by William Porden for the 2nd Earl Grosvenor in his version of Eaton Hall. They were moved here by Detmar Blow in about 1911. They consist of a stone plinth, piers, and copings holding cast iron panels containing shields with coats of arms.	II
Statue of Bishop Odo, Dragon Garden; 53.13949°N 2.87762°W		c. 1810 (probable)	The stone statue of Bishop Odo was originally in the version of Eaton Hall designed by William Porden. It has been restored and reused in the Dragon Garden.	II
Statue of Joan of Eaton, Dragon Garden; 53.13947°N 2.87743°W		c. 1810 (probable)	The stone statue of Joan of Eaton was originally in the version of Eaton Hall designed by William Porden. It has been restored and reused in the Dragon Garden.	II
Stud Stables, Eaton Park; 53.14823°N 2.87511°W		Early 19th century	Three ranges of stables in two storeys, forming a T-shaped plan. They are built in sandstone with a half-timbered gable. Some roofs are tiled; others are slated. The building contains loading doors, haylofts, stable doors, sliding casement windows, and hoppers.	II
Statue of a hunter, Eaton Hall; 53.13987°N 2.87610°W		1852	Created by Raymond Smith for the 2nd Marquess of Westminster. It is in grey stone, on a red sandstone plinth, and depicts a hunter on a rearing horse, with three hounds.	II
Statue of a stag, Eaton Hall; 53.14035°N 2.87595°W		1852	Created by Raymond Smith for the 2nd Marquess of Westminster. It is in grey stone, on a red sandstone plinth, and depicts a stag at bay, its antlers held by a huntsman and surrounded by three dogs.	II
Dragon Fountain, Dragon Garden; 53.13923°N 2.87759°W		c. 1852 (or c. 1896)	This has been attributed to Raymond Smith (earlier date), and to Edwin Lutyens. It is a stone fountain in the form of a dragon with a bowl on its back, and with two intertwined dolphins. It stands in the middle of the pond in the Dragon Garden.	II
Gates, overthrow and piers, Aldford Drive, Eaton Park; 53.13721°N 2.87438°W		c. 1870	These consists of a pair of carriage gates, their piers, and the overthrow. The gates and overthrow are in wrought iron and are ornate, and were possibly designed by Edwin Lutyens. Each gate contains a decorative panel, that on the left including three stags' heads, that on the right a Grosvenor sheaf. The piers are in ashlar stone, and are square. Each has a moulded plinth and cap, recessed panels, and an urn finial.	II
Walls, gates, overthrow and gate piers, Eaton Hall; 53.14233°N 2.87575°W		c. 1870	Designed by Alfred Waterhouse for the 1st Duke of Westminster, the walls are 12 feet (4 m) high and in brick, the gate piers are in brick and sandstone, and the gates and overthrow in wrought iron. The walls separate the nursery and kitchen gardens from the main part of the gardens. The overthrow contains a portcullis medallion and the Grosvenor sheaf.	II*
Statue of Hugh Lupus, Eaton Hall Forecourt; 53.14033°N 2.87843°W		1870–79	The statue was designed by G. F. Watts for the 1st Duke of Westminster. It is in bronze on a stone plinth standing in the forecourt of the hall, and depicts Hugh Lupus seated on a horse, holding a falcon in a gauntlet.	II*
Walls to pond, Eaton Hall Forecourt; 53.14032°N 2.87831°W		1870–79	The stone wall surrounding the pond in the forecourt of the hall which contains the statue of Hugh Lupus.	II
Tea House, Eaton Park; 53.13742°N 2.87586°W		1872	A building in the Dutch Garden designed by John Douglas for the 1st Duke of Westminster. It is timber-framed on a sandstone plinth with a shaped roof with red tiles. The building has a cruciform plan with a verandah at the front. Its features include shaped posts, barleysugar pilasters, a pargetted frieze, and a small spire with a weathercock.	II
Postillion's House, Eaton Hall; 53.14092°N 2.87721°W		1873	A remaining fragment of the great house designed by Alfred Waterhouse for the 1st Duke of Westminster. It stands at the southeast corner of the stable yard, and is joined to the chapel by two-storey wing. The building is in stone with a slate Mansard roof, and has three storeys. At the corners are octagonal turrets.	II*
Eaton Chapel; 53.14092°N 2.87761°W		1873–84	A private chapel, with a clock tower, designed by Alfred Waterhouse for the 1st Duke of Westminster. It is built in sandstone with a slate roof, and consists of a nave and an apsed chancel. Inside is a gallery over a narthex, mosaics, an effigy of Constance, Duchess of Westminster, by Joseph Boehm, marble fittings and furniture, and stained glass.	I
Eaton Hall Cottages; Eaton Hall; 53.14205°N 2.87755°W		1870s	A group of four attached cottages designed by Alfred Waterhouse for the 1st Duke of Westminster. One cottage has three storeys; the others have two. The ground floors are in brick with stone dressings, and the upper storeys and gables are timber-framed. The roofs are in red tiles, and the red brick chimneys are ornate. Each cottage has a projecting gabled porch with timber-framing on a sandstone plinth.	II
Game Pantry; Eaton Hall; 53.14121°N 2.87689°W		1870s	A building in buff and red sandstone and a red tiled roof. It has a rectangular plan, and is in a single storey. It has a short spire in the centre, and a crocketed finial to the south.	II
Lodge, gates, piers and screens, Forecourt, Eaton Hall; 53.14193°N 2.87829°W		1870s	These consist of a lodge, gates, piers, and screens, designed by Alfred Waterhouse for the 1st Duke of Westminster. The lodge has a single chamber, a semi-octagonal bay window, lancet windows, and a gabled roof with a chimney. There is a pair of gate piers carrying lanterns, and a smaller pier without a lantern. The pair of gates is in cast iron and each contains the letter "W". The screens are also in cast iron, and stand on tapered stone plinths.	II
Causeway, Eaton Park; 53.15005°N 2.87764°W		c. 1875 or earlier	The causeway carries the Eccleston Approach over a small dell. It is built in sandstone and is flanked by balustrading between square piers. At each end are wing walls that end in square piers topped by balls.	II
Equestrian Statue, Eaton Hall; 53.14121°N 2.87738°W		1875	A bronze statue of a groom and a rearing horse on a red granite plinth. It was made by Joseph Boehm for the 1st Duke of Westminster. The statue stands in the centre of the stable courtyard.	II
Greenhouse, Eaton Hall; 53.14285°N 2.87486°W		Late 19th century	A greenhouse 380 feet (116 m) long, also known are the Camellia Walk. It has a brick wall on the west side, and glazed timber on the east. In the centre of the east side is a pedimented porch with a spire. At the south end are four steps, with two corner pedestals with pineapple finials.	II
Estate Office, Eaton Park; 53.14857°N 2.87559°W		1877	Designed as a laundry by Alfred Waterhouse for the 1st Duke of Westminster, it is a brick building with stone dressings and half-timbered gables. The roof is tiled. The office has a square plan, is in two storeys, and is linked to a coach house. The decorative details include gables, varied chimneys, and brick diapering. The windows are mullioned and transomed.	II
Eaton Boat, Eaton Park; 53.14396°N 2.87056°W		c. 1877	A house designed by John Douglas for the 1st Duke of Westminster, and originally called Gas Works Cottages. It is built in sandstone with half-timbered gables. The roof is in red and blue tiles. It has four shaped chimneys, and one plain chimney. The ground floor windows are mullioned. To the west is a single-storey brick outbuilding, which is included in the designation.	II
Coach House Court, Eaton Hall; 53.14143°N 2.87732°W		1877–79	An enclosed courtyard incorporating a coach house, a gatehouse, and a riding school, designed by Alfred Waterhouse for the 1st Duke of Westminster. It is built in sandstone and brick, with some timber-framing, and red tiled roofs. Features include a pair of towers with conical roofs in the north range, flanked by gables. Elsewhere there are flèches.	II
Stable Court, Eaton Hall; 53.14123°N 2.87767°W		1877–79	Designed as stables by Alfred Waterhouse for the 1st Duke of Westminster, it consists of four ranges forming a courtyard. It is constructed in brick with half-timbering and tiles roofs. The building includes arched entrances, stair turrets, gables with bargeboards and finials, former accommodation for grooms, a library, and a Long Room (formerly a stable, later converted into a drawing room).	II*
Upper Belgrave Lodge, Belgrave Drive, Eaton Park; 53.14153°N 2.88930°W		1877–79	A lodge designed by John Douglas for the 1st Duke of Westminster in Jacobethan style. It is built in brick and sandstone, and has tiled roofs with terracotta finials. The lodge has a T-shaped plan and is in 1½ storeys. The upper storey of the main part of the house is timber framed and jettied with pargeting in the panels. There is a single-storey rear wing.	II
Gates and gate piers, Garden House, Eaton Hall; 53.14349°N 2.87543°W		c. 1880	A pair of wrought iron gates and an overthrow for the 1st Duke of Westminster, probably designed by Alfred Waterhouse. The overthrow is surmounted by pineapples. The gate piers are in sandstone, they stand on plinths, and have caps and finials.	II
Grotto, Eaton Hall; 53.14097°N 2.87742°W		c. 1880	Designed by Alfred Waterhouse for the 1st Duke of Westminster, this is constructed in simulated stone formed into rocks and stalactites. It is contained in an iron frame, and has a glazed roof.	II
Stud Riding School, Eaton Park; 53.14780°N 2.87541°W	—	c. 1880	The riding school is timber-framed on a sandstone plinth, and is mainly in a single storey. It has a red tiled roof. Above the entrance is a hayloft with a jettied gable. The windows are mullioned or transomed, or both. Also included in the listing are a cart house, and the walls linking the riding school to the stables.	II
Loggia, Eaton Park; 53.13847°N 2.87558°W		c. 1880 (probable)	The loggia was designed by Alfred Waterhouse for the 1st Duke of Westminster in Italianate style. It is located at the south end of the Broad Walk, and is constructed in red and buff sandstone. The front consists of three round arches between Ionic columns, with an entablature. The lateral arches are blank, and the middle one has railings and a pair of gates. Inside is a Roman altar. The loggia was moved to this position in 1911.	II
Urn, Eaton Park; 53.13965°N 2.87130°W		c. 1880 (probable)	The stone urn is 10 feet (3 m) high. It is richly carved and stands on a circular pedestal. The urn is located on the east side of the fishpond, and forms a feature in the view from the hall.	II
North Lodge, Eaton Hall; 53.14401°N 2.87656°W		1881	Designed by Alfred Waterhouse for the 1st Duke of Westminster, it is constructed in sandstone with red tiled roofs. It consists of a circular four-stage tower, with a large dormer, a spire, and a circular stair turret with a conical roof, and a tall chimney. Attached to the tower is a timber-framed store room. There is a walled yard with a lychgate. Inside the tower is a stone spiral staircase.	II
Gate and posts, North Lodge, Eaton Hall; 53.14406°N 2.87674°W	—	c. 1881	Designed by Alfred Waterhouse, this consists of a single wrought iron gate 10 feet (3 m) high. It has a fairly simple design, and stands between two complex sandstone gateposts, each topped by four spirelets and a central iron lantern.	II
Garden Lodge, Eaton Hall; 53.14431°N 2.87508°W		1881–83	Designed by Alfred Waterhouse for the 1st Duke of Westminster, this is a lodge built in sandstone with red tiled roofs. It has two storeys, and a complex plan. Its features include a large central chimney, gables with bargeboards, a bay window, and a timber-framed porch. Outside is a walled yard entered through a lychgate with outbuildings. The wall and outbuildings are included in the designation.	II
Gates, piers, railings and walls, Garden Lodge, Eaton Hall; 53.14432°N 2.87480°W		1881–83	Designed by Alfred Waterhouse for the 1st Duke of Westminster, these consist of a pair of decorated wrought iron gates with railings on each side, flanked by stone walls. The sandstone piers are square, and have ball finials.	II
Parrot House, Eaton Hall; 53.14179°N 2.87462°W		1881–83	Designed by Alfred Waterhouse for the 1st Duke of Westminster, it is in yellow terracotta, and in the form of a circular Ionic temple. A flight of eleven steps lead up to the colonnade, above which are concentric balustrades surrounding the drum that supports the domed roof. Inside are semicircular niches, a frieze of griffins below the clerestory, and caryatids carrying the dome.	II
Stud Lodge, Eaton Park; 53.14759°N 2.87585°W	—	1883	A lodge designed by John Douglas for the 1st Duke of Westminster. It is built in red brick with a red tiled roof, and is in two storeys. In the northwest corner is a tower in brick with an octagonal timber-framed upper stage, standing on a stone base. The window openings are mullioned, and contain casement windows. There is a central shaped brick chimney.	II
Coachmore Hill Lodge; Eaton Park; 53.13878°N 2.87942°W	—	1880s (probable)	A cottage designed by T. M. Lockwood and Sons. It has 1½ storeys, the ground floor being in sandstone, and the upper parts timber-framed. It is roofed in green slates with red ridge tiles. There are stone chimneys with barley sugar moulded brick flues. The front gable is jettied.	II
Gates, piers, and wing walls, Belgrave Lodge, Eaton Park; 53.14394°N 2.91828°W	—	1889	Designed by John Douglas for the 1st Duke of Westminster, these consist of a pair of gates, with piers and wing walls. The gates are in iron, and each carries symbols of the Westminster family. The piers are square and in stone. They each have a moulded plinth and capital, and is surmounted by a talbot dog with a shield. The wing walls are in yellow sandstone.	II
Belgrave Lodge, Belgrave Drive, Eaton Park; 53.14366°N 2.91831°W	—	1889–90	This was built as a lodge, and designed by Douglas and Fordham for the 1st Duke of Westminster. It is constructed in red brick on a stone plinth, with yellow stone dressings, red tiled hipped roofs and shaped lead finials. The building is asymmetrical, has 1½ storeys, and is in two bays. The window openings are mullioned, and contain casement windows. Two single-storey outbuildings to the rear are included in the designation.	II
Obelisk, Eaton Park; 53.14091°N 2.88481°W		1890	The obelisk was designed by Douglas and Fordham for the 1st Duke of Westminster. It has a copper cap in a red sandstone shaft and plinth, standing on a grey stone stepped base. On the plinth are emblems of the Grosvenor family.	II
Garden House, Eaton Hall; 53.14365°N 2.87525°W		1893	A house designed by Douglas and Minshull for the 1st Duke of Westminster, in Jacobean style. It is built in red brick with some blue brick diapering, stone dressings, and a green Westmorland slate roof with red ridge tiles. The house is in three storeys, with half-timbering to the top storey and to the gable of the porch. On the right is a 1½-storey wing. There are three ornate brick chimneys, and another simpler chimney. The window openings are mullioned, and contain casement windows. The wing contains three half-dormers.	II
Railway Engine Shed, Eaton Hall; 53.14287°N 2.87781°W		c. 1895	An engine shed for a narrow gauge railway, built in brick with half-timbered gables and a slate roof. There is a cantilevered canopy on the east side.	II
Gates, screens and piers, Eaton Park; 53.13889°N 2.87768°W		c. 1896	These consist of a pair of folding gates, attributed to Edwin Lutyens for the 1st Duke of Westminster; the piers were added later. The gates and screens are in wrought iron, the gates depicting formalised trees. The square piers are in rusticated stone, and have carved cherub heads on the inner faces.	II
Wall and steps, Eaton Park; 53.13971°N 2.87722°W		c. 1896	The design has been attributed to Edwin Lutyens, and probably altered by Detmar Blow for the 2nd Duke of Westminster in 1911. They are in grey stone and red sandstone The wings of the wall are balustraded; to the left it projects and overlooks the Dragon Garden; to the right it has a flight of twelve steps.	II
Wall, Eaton Park; 53.13910°N 2.87761°W		c. 1896	The design has been attributed to Edwin Lutyens, and consists of the sandstone wall surrounding the pool in the Dragon Garden.	II
Gates, Eaton Park; 53.14228°N 2.87645°W		c. 1900 (probable)	A pair of wrought iron gates, painted black, at the southwest corner of the walled garden.	II
Walls, Axial Canal, Eaton Hall; 53.14007°N 2.87600°W		1911	The stone walls of the rectangular canal basin were designed by Detmar Blow for the 2nd Duke of Westminster.	II
Walls, Oval Pond, Eaton Hall; 53.14001°N 2.87500°W	—	1911	These were designed by Detmar Blow for the 2nd Duke of Westminster, and surround the Oval Pond in the middle of the Broad Walk. They are in stone, and are surrounded by paving.	II
Walls and steps (east), Eaton Hall; 53.14006°N 2.87539°W	—	1911	These were designed by Detmar Blow for the 2nd Duke of Westminster. They are in grey stone and red sandstone. At the centre is a sinuous wall, which are flanked by curving flights of cobbled steps.	II
Walls and steps (west), Eaton Hall; 53.14017°N 2.87673°W	—	1911	These were designed by Detmar Blow for the 2nd Duke of Westminster. They consist of the retaining wall at the end of the terrace east of the hall, a pair of steps at each end of the wall, and the walls of the pond below. The retaining wall is slightly curved, and has a balustrade and two urns. A lower wall contains five stone lions' heads with spouts supplying water to the pond.	II
Gates and overthrow, Eaton Park; 53.13754°N 2.87589°W	—	1913	The gates and overthrow were designed for the 2nd Duke of Westminster. They are in wrought iron, and painted in black and gold. They stand to the north of the Tea House.	II

== See also ==
- Grade II listed buildings in Chester (south)
- Listed buildings in Aldford
- Listed buildings in Eccleston
- Listed buildings in Huntington
- Listed buildings in Marlston-cum-Lache
- Listed buildings in Poulton
- Listed buildings in Pulford
- Listed buildings in Saighton
