= Eaton Chapel =

Coordinates: 53.1409°N 2.8776°W

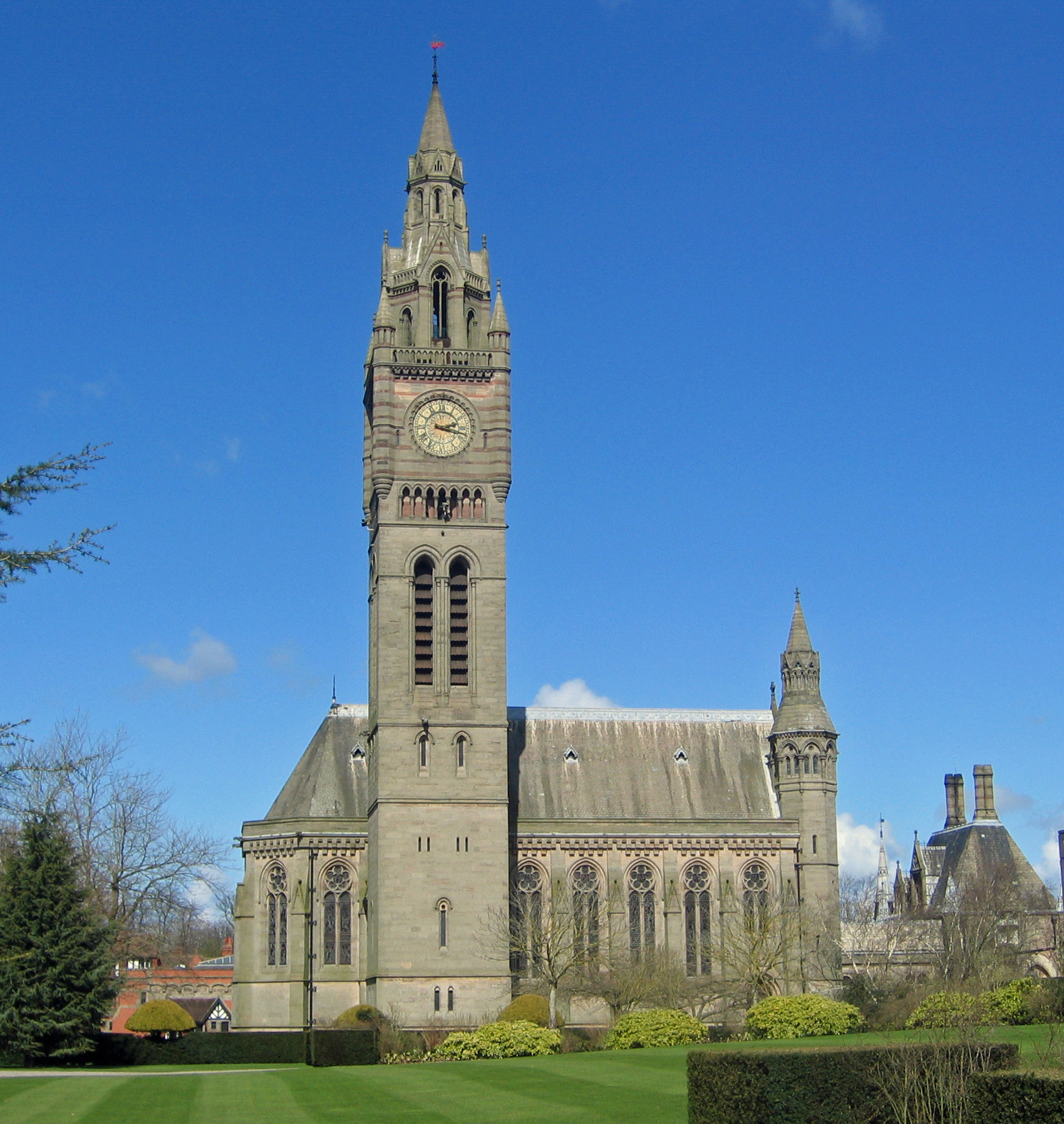
- Chapel of Eaton Hall seen from the south

- Location in Cheshire
- OS grid reference: SJ 413 607
- Location: Eaton Hall near Eccleston, Cheshire
- Country: England
- Denomination: Anglican
- Website: Eaton Hall Chapel

History
- Status: Private chapel

Architecture
- Functional status: Active
- Heritage designation: Grade I
- Designated: 2 November 1983
- Architect: Alfred Waterhouse
- Architectural type: Chapel
- Style: Gothic Revival
- Groundbreaking: 1869
- Completed: 1884

Specifications
- Materials: Buff sandstone Grey slate roof

Administration
- Diocese: Chester

Eaton Chapel is a private chapel to the north of Eaton Hall in Eaton Park, near the village of Eccleston, Cheshire, England. It is recorded in the National Heritage List for England as a designated Grade I listed building.

== History ==
Building of the chapel commenced in 1869, soon after the estate was inherited by Hugh Grosvenor, the 3rd Marquess of Westminster, in conjunction with a major rebuilding of the hall. Grosvenor became the 1st Duke of Westminster in 1874. He appointed Alfred Waterhouse as architect and the building was completed in 1884. When the Waterhouse hall was demolished in 1963, the chapel was retained.

== Architecture ==
=== Exterior ===
The chapel is built in buff sandstone with a grey slate roof. Internally the stone is in pink and buff bands. Its plan consists of a five-bay nave that is continuous with a three-bay chancel. The chancel terminates with a three-sided apse containing the altar. The chapel is oriented with the altar at the west end. The last bay at the east end constitutes a narthex (ante-chapel) with a gallery. On the south of the chapel is a tower which is free-standing, but joined to the chapel at the lower two storeys, and by a bridge above. At the southeast corner is a staircase turret. On the south side of the nave and in the apse are two-light windows and at the east end behind the gallery is a four-light window. The tower has six stages and contains tall lancet bell-openings. Above these is the clock stage, corbelled out from the shaft of the tower and surmounted by pinnacles at each corner. On each side is a clock face made from vitreous enamel; each clock face is 9 feet 8 inches (2.95 m) in diameter. Over this is a spire decorated with gables and pinnacles. The staircase turret is surmounted by a spire.

=== Interior ===
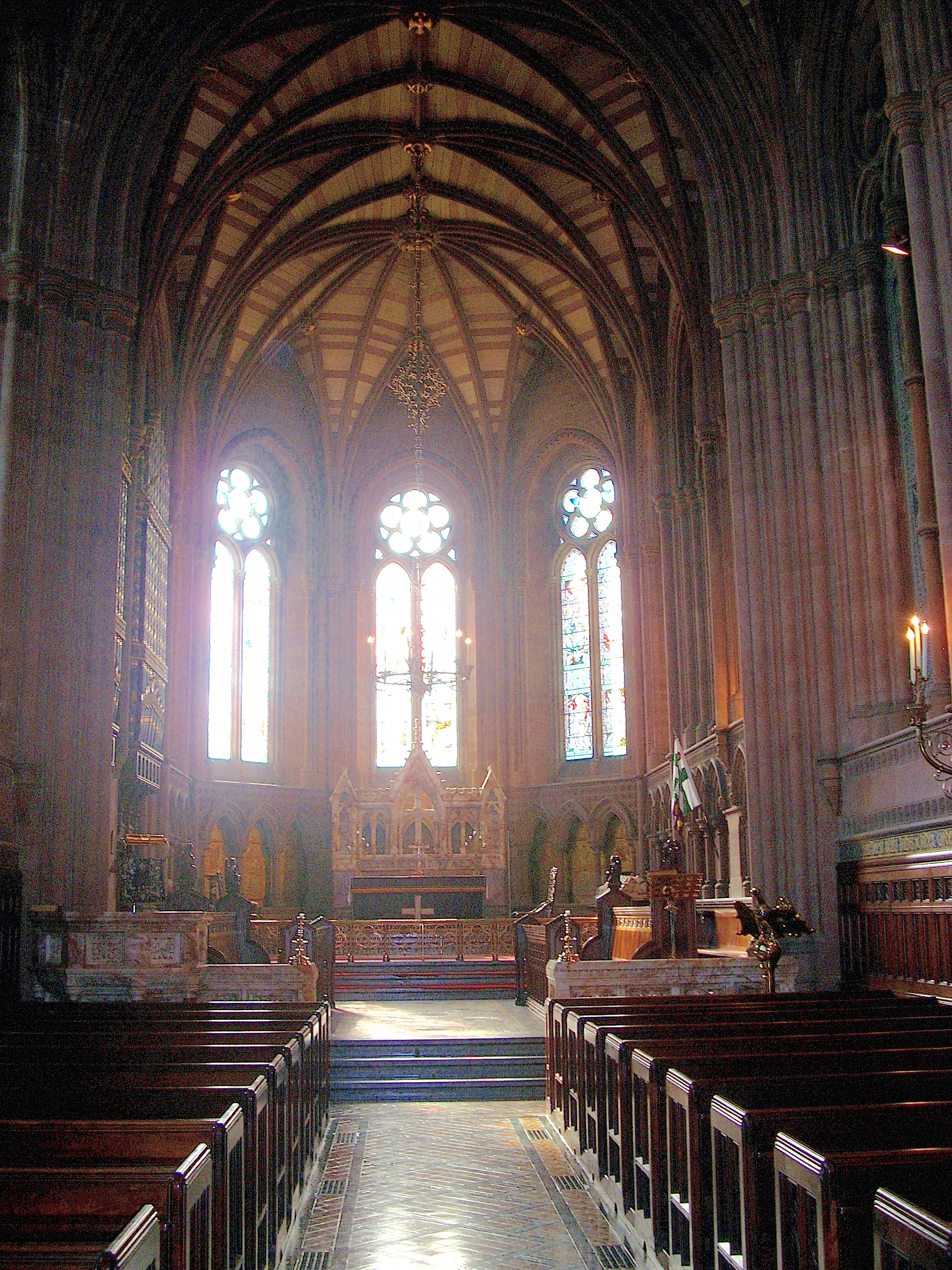
Interior looking toward high altar, unusually at the west end

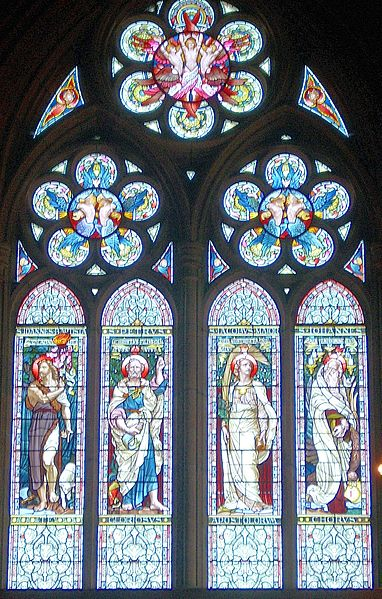
The east window

The narthex at the east end has a groin vaulted oak roof, and is paved with black marble and with encaustic tiles. A stone screen leads into the nave. This also has a groin vaulted roof, but built in stone. Between the nave and the chancel is a low alabaster screen. A continuation of this screen leads to the pulpit: this is also constructed in alabaster with Devonshire marble columns. The reredos and the font are also made in alabaster. The benches in the nave and chancel are in walnut and have carved ends. In the chancel is a recumbent effigy in alabaster of Constance, 1st Duchess of Westminster, by Joseph Boehm. For the effigy, Boehm worked from plaster casts of the face and hands taken after her death.

The stained glass in the windows of the south side of the nave and the apse, and the mosaics in the blank on the north side of the nave were designed by Frederic Shields. These were commissioned in 1876 and made by Heaton, Butler and Bayne. The two-manual organ is in an alcove on the south side of the chancel. It was built in 1870–71 by Charles Whiteley of Chester and is still in good working order. The clock tower contains a carillon of 28 bells which were cast by Chavalier Severian Van Aerschodt of Louvain; it plays 31 tunes. The clock was manufactured by Gillet's of Croydon.

== Present day ==
The chapel continues to be the private chapel of the Grosvenor family and is used for family christenings, confirmations and memorial services. Each December it is made available for up to eight charities to arrange Christmas carol concerts. The chapel is also open to the general public on three annual open days.

== See also ==
- Grade I listed churches in Cheshire
- Grade I listed buildings in Cheshire West and Chester
- Listed buildings in Eaton, Cheshire West and Chester
- List of ecclesiastical works by Alfred Waterhouse
