= Eaton Boat =

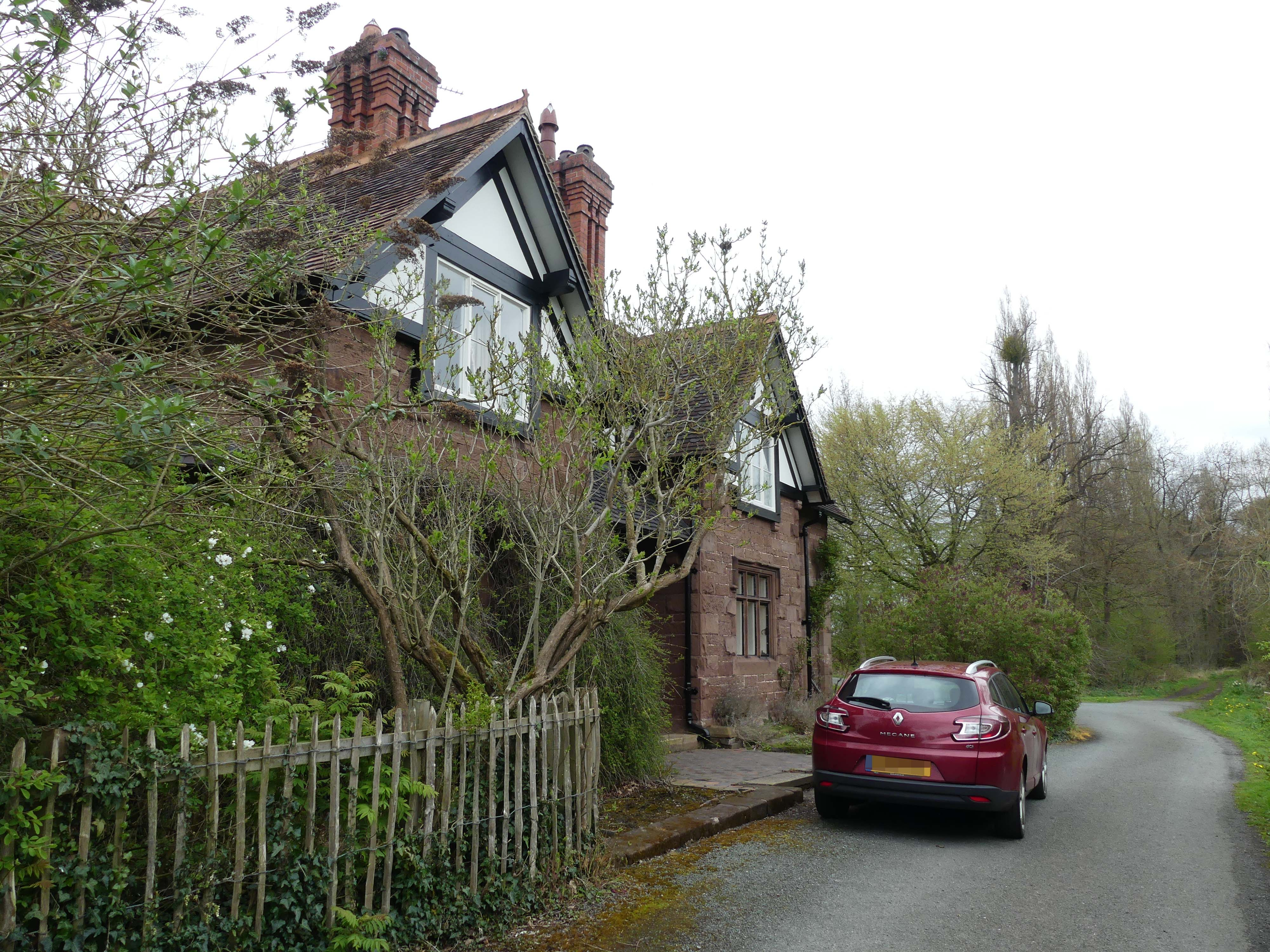

- Location in Cheshire
- 53.144°N 2.8706°W
- Location: Eaton Hall, Cheshire, England
- OS grid reference: SJ418611

History
- Built: c. 1887–80
- Built for: 1st Duke of Westminster

Site notes
- Architect: John Douglas

Listed Building – Grade II
- Designated: 2 November 1983
- Reference no.: 1129925

Eaton Boat is the name of a house within the grounds of Eaton Hall, Cheshire, England. It was originally called Gas Works Cottages. The house is recorded in the National Heritage List for England as a designated Grade II listed building.

== History ==
Eaton Boat was built in about 1877 or about 1880 to a design by the Chester architect John Douglas for the 1st Duke of Westminster.

== Architecture ==
The house is constructed in sandstone and has half-timbered gables. The roof is patterned with red and blue tiles. There are five chimneys, one of which is plain and the others are shaped. To the west is a single-storey outbuilding, constructed in common brick with a tiled roof.

== See also ==
- Listed buildings in Eaton, Cheshire West and Chester
- List of houses and associated buildings by John Douglas
