= Golden Gates, Eaton Hall =

Coordinates: 53.1404°N 2.8791°W

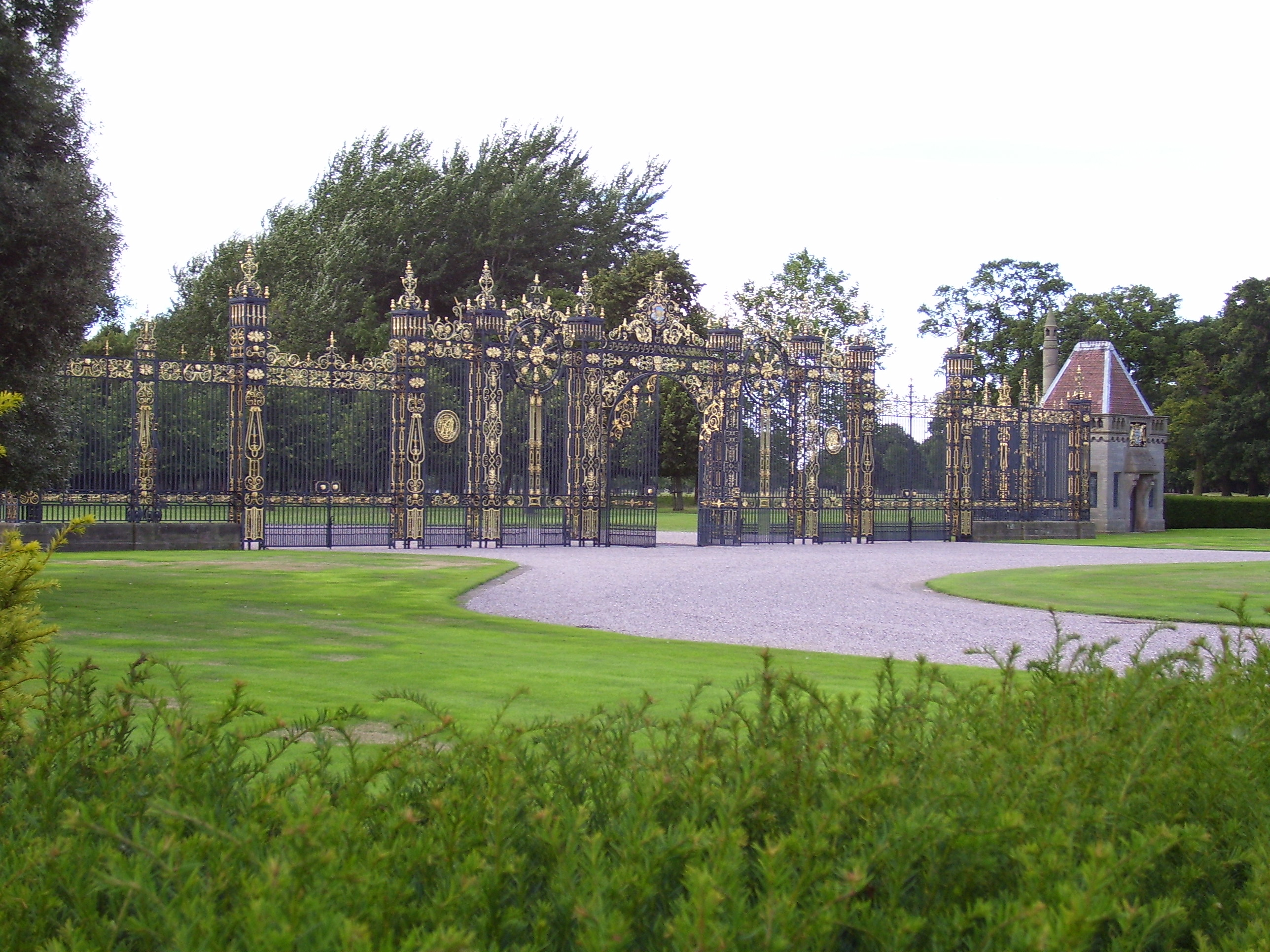
The Golden Gates with overthrow, screens and one of the wing lodges

The Golden Gates at Eaton Hall, Cheshire, England, stand at the eastern end of Belgrave Avenue (grid reference SJ412607). The gates with their overthrow, the screens at their sides and the associated wing lodges are recorded in the National Heritage List for England as a designated Grade I listed building. The gates stand in front of what was formerly the principal entrance to the forecourt of the hall. The central pair of gates and the adjacent screen railings date from the early 18th century and are by Robert and John Davies of Croes Foel. The further side gates and screens, dating from around 1880, were designed by Alfred Waterhouse and made by Skidmore of Coventry. At the extremities is a pair of lodges, which are also dated around 1880, and by Alfred Waterhouse. The lodges are designed in a French Renaissance style. They are in one storey and have one room, with a sentry-box-like porch at the front. The roofs are steeply hipped, and at the eaves is a corbelled balustrade.

== See also ==
- Grade I listed buildings in Cheshire West and Chester
- Listed buildings in Eaton, Cheshire West and Chester
