= Upper Belgrave Lodge =

- Location in Cheshire
- 53.1415°N 2.8893°W
- Location: Belgrave Avenue, Eaton Hall, Cheshire, England
- OS grid reference: SJ 406 609

History
- Built: 1877–79
- Built for: 1st Duke of Westminster

Site notes
- Architect: John Douglas
- Architectural style: Jacobethan

Listed Building – Grade II
- Designated: 2 November 1983
- Reference no.: 1136146

Upper Belgrave Lodge is a house at the east end of Belgrave Avenue, the road connecting the B5445 road between Chester and Wrexham, and Eaton Hall, Cheshire, England. It is recorded in the National Heritage List for England as a designated Grade II listed building.

== History ==
The lodge was built in 1877–79 and designed by the Chester architect John Douglas. The patron was the 1st Duke of Westminster.

== Architecture ==
The house is built in a T-plan with 1½ storeys in Jacobethan style. It is constructed in red brick with scattered sandstone blocks; the hipped roofs are tiled and have terracotta finials. The upper storey of the main part of the house is timber framed and jettied with pargeting in the panels; the gable end contains a four-light window and above this is tile hanging. Under the gable is a carved bressumer. To the west is an oak-framed porch on a sandstone plinth. The doorway has a Tudor arch above which is a pargeted panel. The rear wing is single-storeyed.

== See also ==
- Listed buildings in Eaton, Cheshire West and Chester
- List of houses and associated buildings by John Douglas
