= St Lawrence's Church, Aldfield =

Church in Aldfield, North Yorkshire, England

Coordinates: 54°07′14″N 1°35′41″W

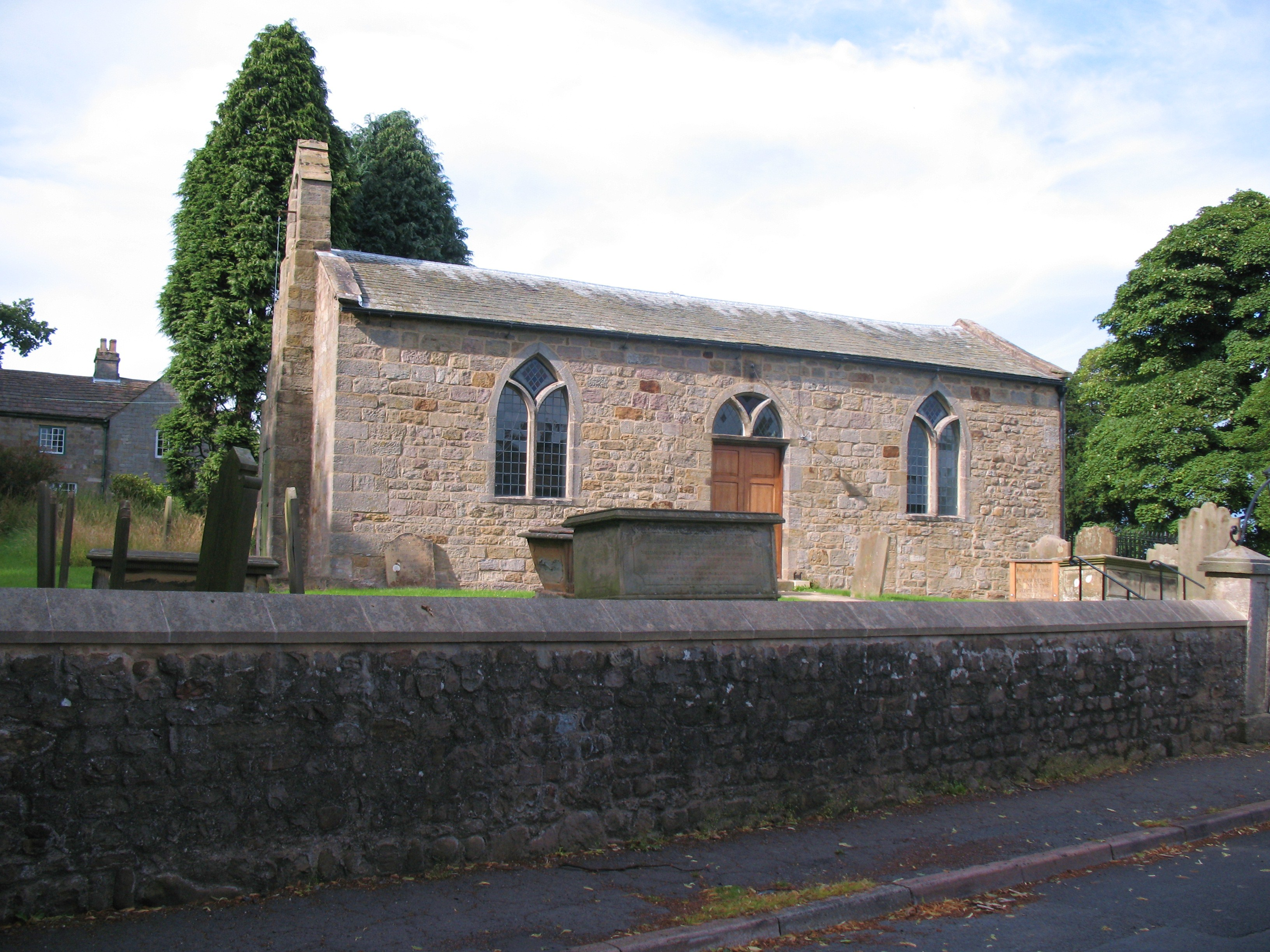
The church, in 2010

St Lawrence's Church is the parish church of Aldfield, a village in North Yorkshire, in England.

The first church on the site was built in the 14th century. It was rebuilt in the 1780s. In 1878, St Mary's, Studley Royal was completed, and superseded St Lawrence as the parish church, but in 1969 St Lawrence was restored to the role. The church was Grade II* listed in 1967.

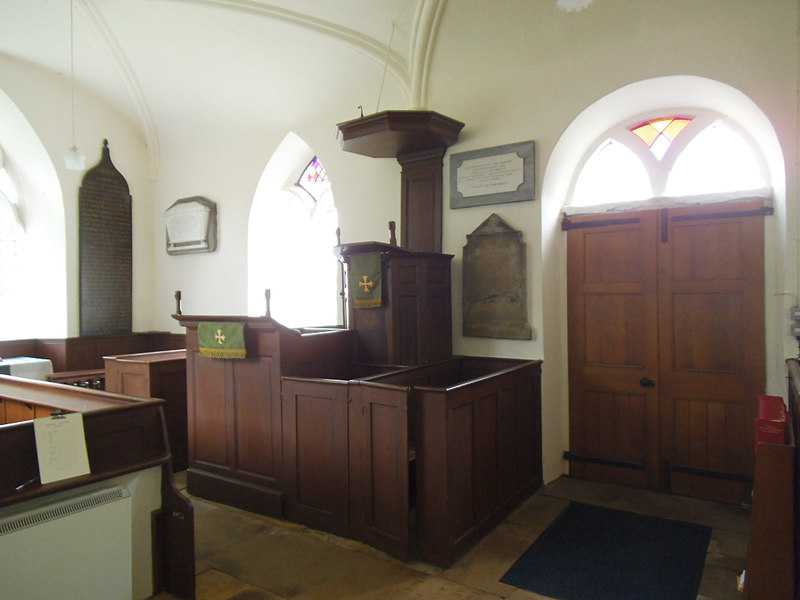
The pulpit, seen in 2017

The church is built of gritstone rubble, with a slate roof. It has a three-bay nave, with a bellcote at the west end. There is a north transept with a vestry, and just a small east projection as a sanctuary. The building is in the Gothick style, with pointed windows, many of which have Y-shaped tracery. There is a sundial, which is inscribed "1696 Mr. A. SMITH R.W R.L." Inside, there is a three-decker pulpit, with a sounding board and original candlesticks, box pews throughout, and an organ at the west end.

== See also ==
- Listed buildings in Aldfield
