= Aldfield =

Village and civil parish in North Yorkshire, England

Coordinates: 54°07′11″N 1°35′53″W

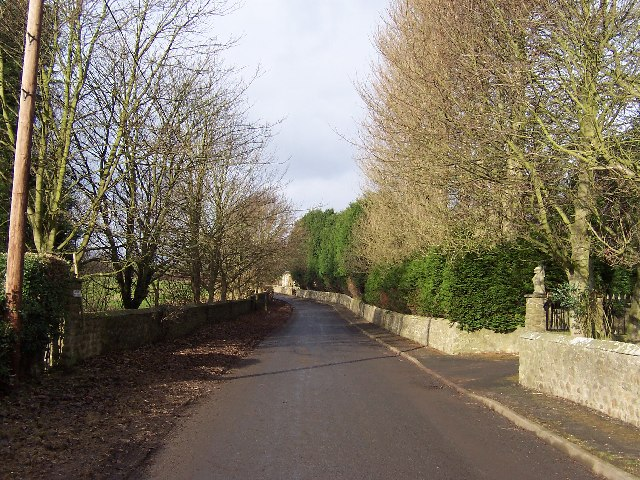
- Aldfield

- Location within North Yorkshire
- OS grid reference: SE263693
- Unitary authority: North Yorkshire
- Ceremonial county: North Yorkshire
- Region: Yorkshire and the Humber
- Country: England
- Sovereign state: United Kingdom
- Post town: RIPON
- Postcode district: HG4
- Police: North Yorkshire
- Fire: North Yorkshire
- Ambulance: Yorkshire
- UK Parliament: Skipton and Ripon

Aldfield is a village and civil parish in the county of North Yorkshire, England, about three miles west of Ripon. It is the closest village to Fountains Abbey and became part of the abbey estate in 1356. The population of the parish was estimated at 80 in 2013. The parish now shares a grouped parish council with the civil parishes of Studley Roger and Lindrick with Studley Royal and Fountains, known as Fountains Abbey Parish Council.

St Lawrence's Church, Aldfield, is a grade II* listed building, dating from the 1780s.

== History ==
The name Aldfield derives from the Old English aldfeld meaning 'old field'.

Aldfield was listed in the Domesday Book of 1086.

Sulphurous mineral springs were discovered near Aldfield in around 1698 leading to the establishment of Aldfield Spa. Lord de Grey, on whose land the spring was, adapted an adjacent cottage so that the water could be used there for the treatment of various ailments. It closed in the 1930s but the ruined buildings are still visible.

Aldfield was the birthplace of the artist William Powell Frith in 1819.

Historically, the village lay in the Claro Wapentake of the West Riding of Yorkshire. From 1974 to 2023 it was part of the Borough of Harrogate, it is now administered by the unitary North Yorkshire Council.

== See also ==
- Listed buildings in Aldfield
