= Listed buildings in Studley Roger =

Studley Roger is a civil parish in the county of North Yorkshire, England. It contains eight listed buildings that are recorded in the National Heritage List for England. All the listed buildings are designated at Grade II, the lowest of the three grades, which is applied to "buildings of national importance and special interest". The parish contains the village of Studley Roger and the surrounding countryside. The listed buildings consist of houses, a bridge, and structures around the entrance to the grounds of Studley Royal Park.

== Buildings ==
Name and location	Photograph	Date	Notes
Plumpton Hall; 54.12165°N 1.55639°W		Mid-17th century	The farmhouse is in stone on a plinth, with quoins, and roofs of stone slate and Westmorland slate with gable coping. There are two storeys, a front block of three bays, and a three-bay rear wing. The left bay on the east front has a canted bay window, and the other windows are sashes. The left wing has an attic window with three stepped round-headed lights, and a stepped hood mould. The doorway has an elaborately moulded surround, and a lintel with three panels containing inscriptions and a date. Elsewhere, there are blocked mullioned windows.
Laurence House and Downing House; 54.12597°N 1.55693°W	—	Late 17th century	A large house divided into two, it is in brown brick, with stone quoins, a dentilled eaves cornice, and a stone slate roof. There are two storeys and attics, and five bays, the outer bays with pedimented gables and extended to the rear to form a U-shaped plan. The central doorway has pilasters, a semicircular fanlight, an entablature and a dentilled pediment, and the windows flanking and above it are sashes with incised lintels and keystones. The outer bays contain two-storey canted bay windows with sashes and dentilled cornices, and above them are lunette windows.
Old Post House; 54.12681°N 1.55753°W	—	Mid to late 18th century	The house is in stone, with limestone quoins and a pantile roof. There are two storeys and three bays. The doorway has a five-light fanlight and a cambered head, and the windows are sashes in architraves.
Piers and railings east of Studley Lodge; 54.12532°N 1.55616°W		Mid to late 18th century	Flanking the entrance to the drive to Studley Royal Park are square stone piers with moulded cornices and flat caps. Outside these piers are railings with similar intermediate and end piers.
Piers and railings west of Studley Lodge; 54.12440°N 1.55982°W	—	Mid to late 18th century	Flanking the entrance to the drive to Studley Royal Park are square wooden piers with pyramidal caps. Outside these are railings with intermediate and end square stone piers with moulded cornices and flat caps.
Duck House; 54.12796°N 1.54909°W	—	Late 18th century	The house is in limestone, with gritstone on the upper storey, quoins, a floor band, and a stone slate roof. There re two storeys, a square plan, three bays, and a single-storey rear extension. The central doorway has a moulded surround and a pointed head, the windows on the front are casements in architraves with pointed heads, and there are two gabled dormers. On the left return are sash windows, and the right return has a two-story bay window.
Bridge near Duck House; 54.12701°N 1.55012°W	—	Late 18th century	The bridge is in gritstone, and consists of two shallow arches with rusticated voussoirs. There are rounded cutwaters carried up as pilasters to a projecting band. The railings are in wrought iron, they have urns and scrolls to the finials, and the terminals have elaborate scrolled panels with urns.
Studley Lodge; 54.12505°N 1.55641°W	—	Late 18th to early 19th century	The estate lodge, later a private house, is rendered, and has a hipped stone slate roof. There is a single storey, a two-bay main block, and a projecting central bay containing a gabled porch. The windows have flat or pointed heads and stepped hood moulds.
