= Belgrave Lodge =

Grade II listed house, Belgrave Avenue, Cheshire, England

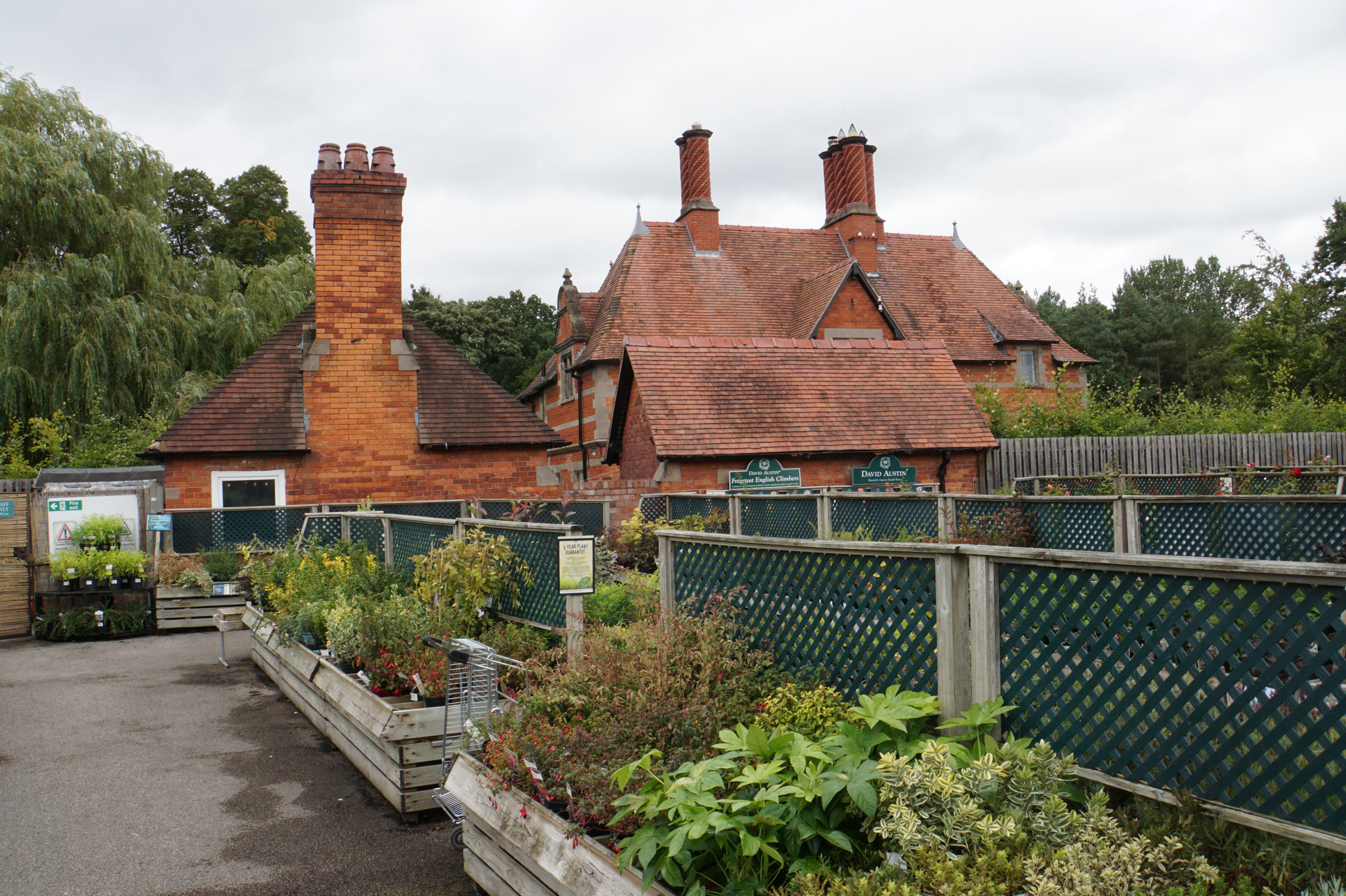
- Belgrave Lodge behind buildings of Grosvenor Garden Centre

- Location in Cheshire
- 53.1437°N 2.9183°W
- Location: Belgrave Avenue, Eaton Hall, Cheshire, England
- OS grid reference: SJ 3867 6112

History
- Built: 1889
- Built for: 1st Duke of Westminster

Site notes
- Architect: John Douglas

Listed Building – Grade II
- Designated: 2 November 1983
- Reference no.: 1129922

Belgrave Lodge is a house at the west end of Belgrave Avenue, the road connecting the B5445 road between Chester and Wrexham, and Eaton Hall, Cheshire, England. It is recorded in the National Heritage List for England as a designated Grade II listed building.

== History ==
The lodge was built in 1889 to a design by the Chester architects Douglas and Fordham for the 1st Duke of Westminster. The ground floor has since been converted into a restaurant.

== Architecture ==
The house is built in brick with stone bands and dressings on a stone plinth. The hipped roof has red tiles with lead finials. As a whole the house has 1½ storeys and is in two bays. It has three chimneys with red-brick barley-sugar flues and stone plinths and caps. The window openings are mullioned, and contain casement windows. There are two single-storey buildings at the rear, one with a gabled roof, the other with a hipped roof.

== See also ==
- Listed buildings in Eaton, Cheshire West and Chester
- List of houses and associated buildings by John Douglas
