= Studley Roger =

Village and civil parish in North Yorkshire, England

Coordinates: 54.116667°N 1.55°W

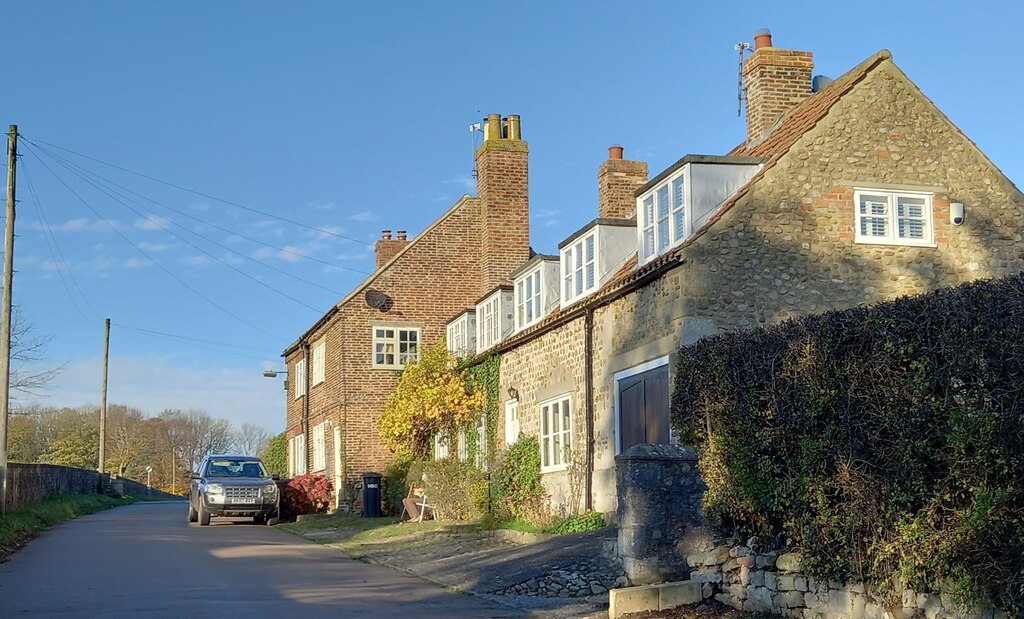
- Housing in Studley Roger

- Location within North Yorkshire
- Population: 175 (2011)
- Unitary authority: North Yorkshire
- Ceremonial county: North Yorkshire
- Region: Yorkshire and the Humber
- Country: England
- Sovereign state: United Kingdom
- Post town: Ripon
- Postcode district: HG4
- Police: North Yorkshire
- Fire: North Yorkshire
- Ambulance: Yorkshire
- UK Parliament: Skipton and Ripon

Studley Roger is a small village and civil parish in the county of North Yorkshire, England, and it is about 1 mile west of the cathedral city of Ripon. The population of the civil parish was 175 at the 2011 Census. The parish now shares a grouped parish council with the civil parishes of Aldfield and Lindrick with Studley Royal and Fountains, known as Fountains Abbey Parish Council. Neighbouring the village of Studley Roger is Studley Royal Park which contains the remains of Fountains Abbey and is a World Heritage Site.

The word stōd, means a stud, where horses are kept. lēah, a forest, Wood, Glade or Clearing.

Until 1974 it was part of the West Riding of Yorkshire. From 1974 to 2023 it was part of the Borough of Harrogate, it is now administered by the unitary North Yorkshire Council.

== Studley Roger and the surrounding area ==
Studley Roger and its surrounding area

Studley Roger is located a mile west of the market town of Ripon. To the south west in the local area of Studley Roger is Studley Royal Park, which contains the ruins of Fountains Abbey. Studley Park and the Fountains Abbey is now a UNESCO world heritage site, it is considered an area of outstanding beauty

"A striking landscape was created around the ruins of the Cistercian Fountains Abbey and Fountains Hall Castle, in Yorkshire. The 18th-century landscaping, gardens and canal, the 19th-century plantations and vistas, and the neo-Gothic castle of Studley Royal Park, make this an outstanding site."

Studley Roger Does also lack in any local amenities, the village has no school so students head in the local town of Ripon for their education. The parish also lacks a church and pub in the area. Meaning Fountains abbey is the main attraction for visitors to the village.

== Population ==
According to the 2011 census Studley Rogers total population was 175 people. The population has fluctuated over the years with a notable increase in population from the 1950s. But has however stayed in a small population size, however notable during the wars the population drops. You can also say that the recent drop in population would also match the national trend of people moving out of rural areas and into urban ones. The census data also shows the population of Studley Roger to have a population in every age group, also in the different brackets of economic activity, with economically active full-time persons being the highest among the population of Studley Roger. Studley Roger currently has ten students aged four and over. Showing that Studley Roger has a high age average being 45. with many older working professionals, and an ageing population in the local area.

== See also ==
- Listed buildings in Studley Roger
