= Dutch Tea House, Eaton Hall =

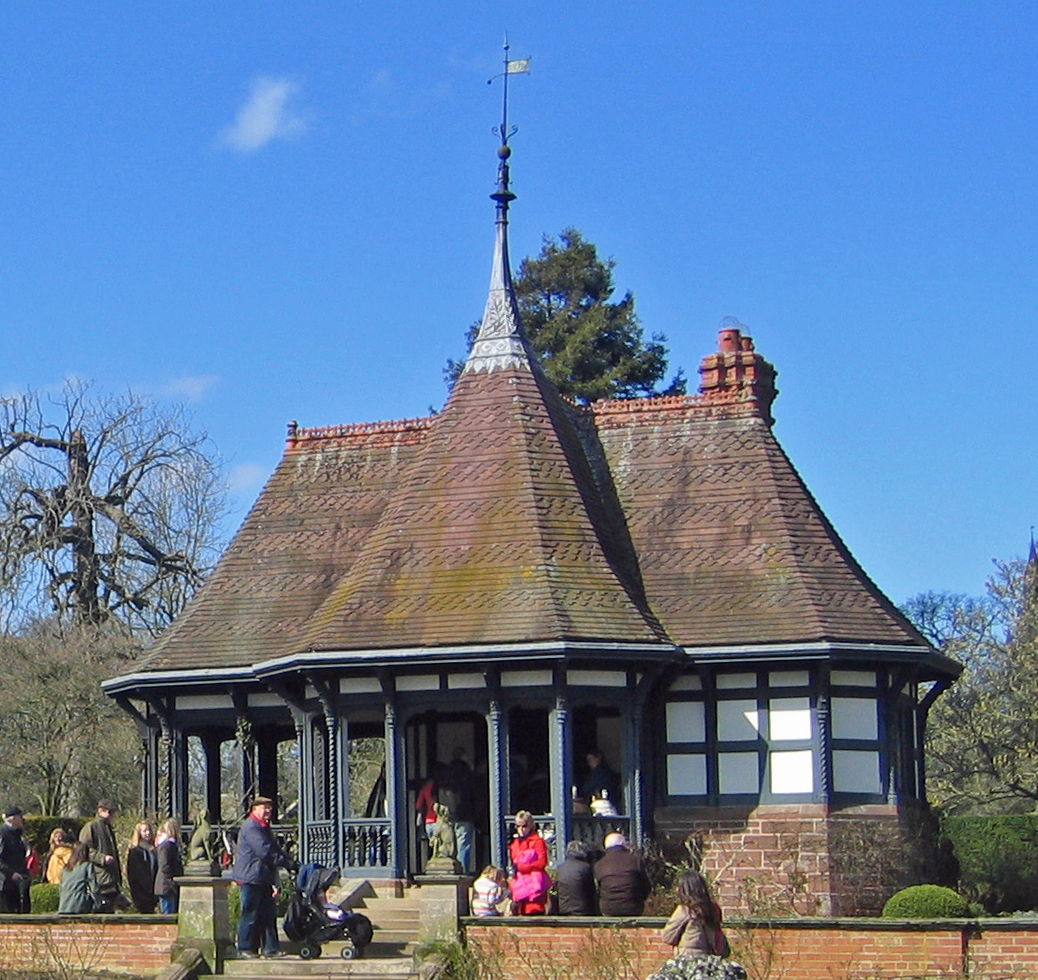
- Dutch Tea House in Eaton Hall gardens on an open day

- Location in Cheshire
- 53.1374°N 2.8759°W
- Location: Eaton Hall, Cheshire, England
- OS grid reference: SJ 415 604

History
- Built: 1872
- Built for: 2nd Earl Grosvenor

Site notes
- Architect: John Douglas

Listed Building – Grade II
- Designated: 2 November 1983
- Reference no.: 1330197

The Dutch Tea House is in the grounds of Eaton Hall, Cheshire, England. It is recorded in the National Heritage List for England as a designated Grade II listed building.

The building was designed by the Chester architect John Douglas for the 2nd Earl Grosvenor (later the 1st Duke of Westminster) in 1872. It stands at the north end of the Dutch Garden which was designed by C. E. Mallows.

The tea house has a cruciform plan. It is a timber-framed building on a red sandstone plinth with a red tiled roof that rises with a concave profile to a point. On the apex is a large lead finial with a small weather vane. At the front is a verandah, the tearoom is in the centre and to the left, and the kitchen is on the right. The wooden posts supporting the verandah are carved, and above these is a pargetted frieze. A flight of six steps leads down to the Dutch Garden.

== See also ==
- Listed buildings in Eaton, Cheshire West and Chester
- List of non-ecclesiastical and non-residential works by John Douglas
