= Eaton Hall, Cheshire =

Country house in Cheshire, England

Eaton Hall
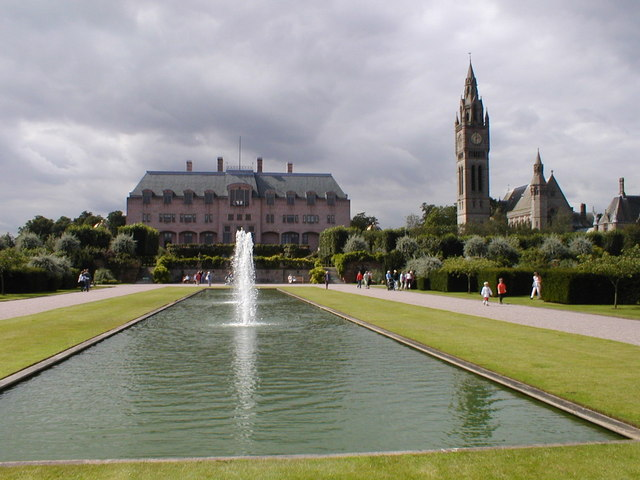
- Eaton Hall from the east, showing the current house at left and the Victorian Eaton Chapel at right

- Location within Cheshire

General information
- Location: Eccleston, Cheshire, England, United Kingdom
- Coordinates: 53.1403°N 2.8775°W
- Owner: The Duke of Westminster

Website
- https://www.grosvenor.com/rural-estates/eaton-estate
Designations

Eaton Hall is the country house of the Duke of Westminster. It is 1 mile (2 km) south of the village of Eccleston in Cheshire, England. The house is surrounded by its own formal gardens, parkland, farmland and woodland. The estate covers about 10,872 acres (4,400 ha). (Note: 1.9% of the reduced, modern county)

The first substantial house on the site was built in the 17th century. During the early 19th century it was replaced by a much larger house designed by William Porden. This in turn was replaced by an even larger house, with outbuildings and a chapel, designed by Alfred Waterhouse. Its construction started in 1870 and concluded about 12 years later. By 1960 the fabric of the house had deteriorated and, like many other mansions during this period, it was demolished, although the chapel and many of the outbuildings were retained. A new house was built but its design was not considered to be sympathetic to the local landscape, and in the late 1980s it was re-cased and given the appearance of a French château.

The house has been surrounded by formal gardens since the 17th century, the design of which has changed over the centuries in accordance with contemporary ideas and fashions, as has the surrounding parkland. A variety of buildings are included in the estate, some decorative, others built for the business of the estate; many of these are listed buildings. The house and estate are not normally open to the public, but the gardens are open on three days a year to raise money for charity, and some of the estate's buildings can be hired for charitable purposes.

== Halls ==
Eaton Hall has been the country house of the Grosvenor family since the 15th century. There is evidence of a two-storey house on a moated site in the estate in a 17th century estate map and an 18th century engraving. A survey undertaken in 1798 showed that the building was still present.

=== Samwell Hall ===
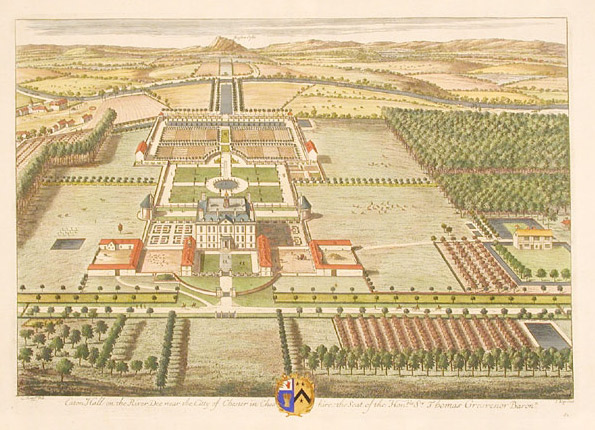
The estate showing the Samwell Hall in 1708. The former house can be seen in the bottom right corner.

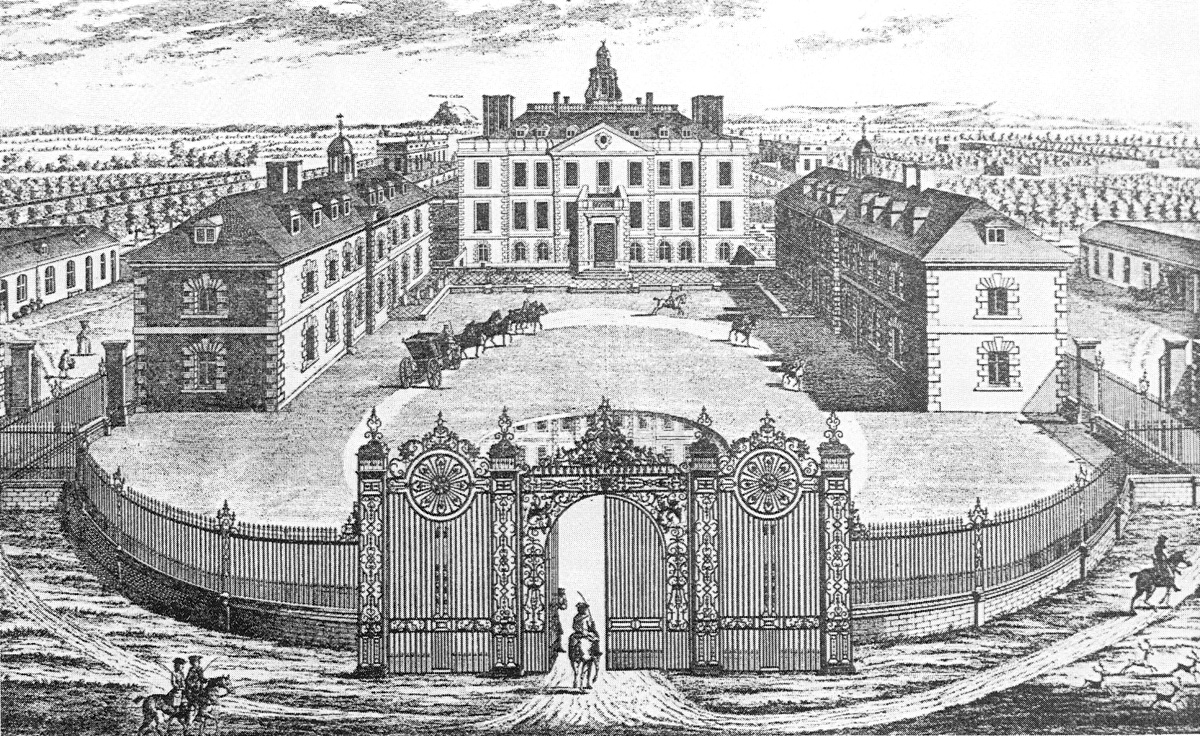
The entrance front of the Samwell house

The first substantial house was built for Sir Thomas Grosvenor, 3rd Baronet. He inherited the estate at the age of 8 when he succeeded his grandfather, Sir Richard Grosvenor, 2nd Baronet, who died in 1665. The new owner commissioned the architect William Samwell to design the house. Building started in 1675; much of the stone used was brought from the ruined Holt Castle in north Wales. By 1683 the cost of building the house had risen to over £1,000 (equivalent to £660,000 in 2025). An engraving of the time shows it to have been a substantial square house with three storeys and dormers. The entrance front had nine bays and a portico. The engraving also shows the earlier moated house to the south of the new house.

=== Porden Hall ===
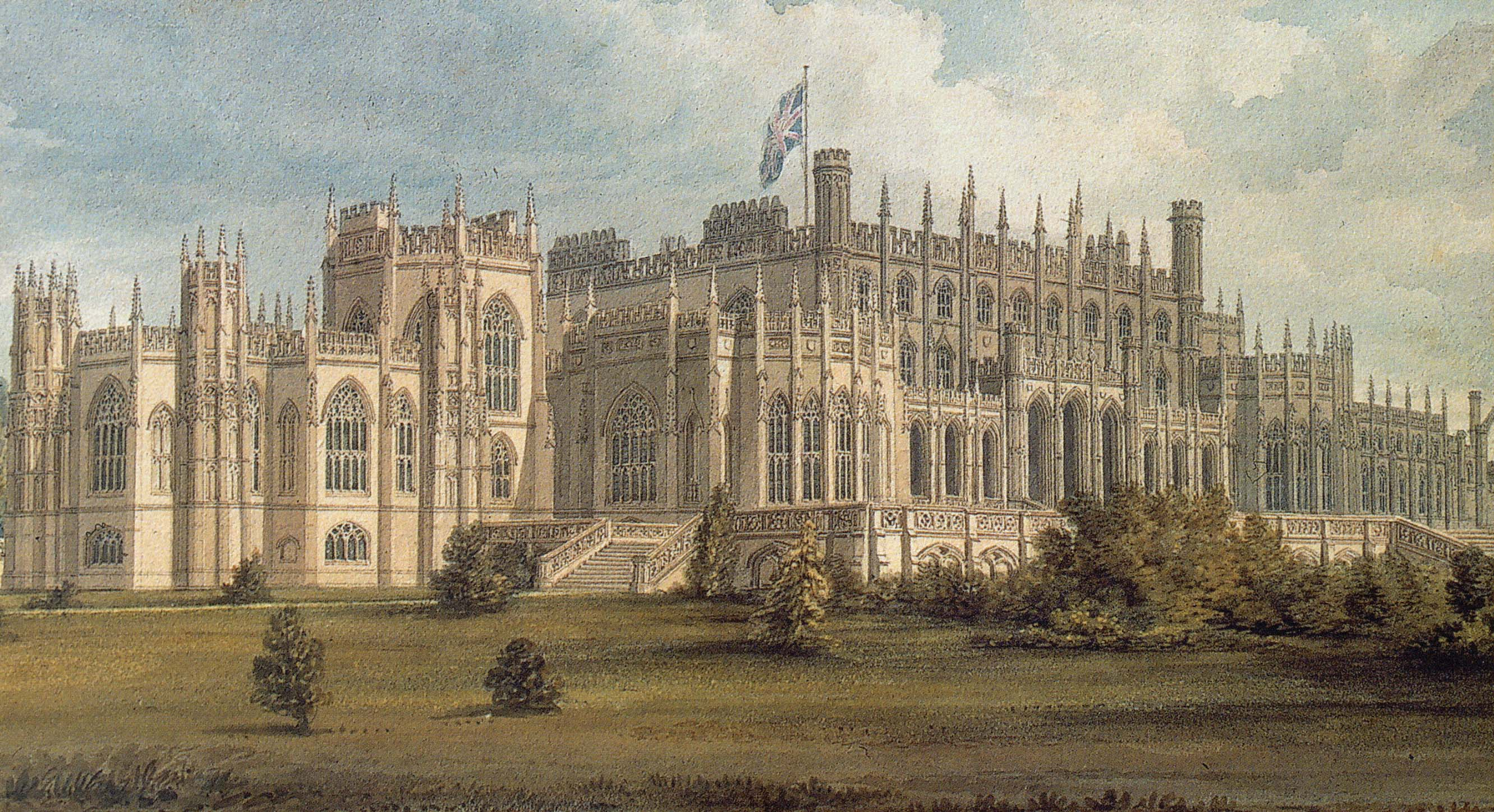
Hall as designed by William Porden

By the time that Robert Grosvenor, then the 2nd Earl Grosvenor, and later the 1st Marquess of Westminster, inherited the estate in 1802, the Samwell Hall had become old-fashioned and in need of renovation. Grosvenor appointed William Porden to plan the improvements. Building started in 1803 and Porden (later assisted by Porden's son-in-law Joseph Kay) estimated it would take three years to build at a cost of £10,000 (equivalent to £780,000 in 2025). In the event it took just under 10 years and cost over £100,000 (equivalent to £6,000,000 in 2025). The previous house was encased and surrounded by "every possible permutation of the gothic style"; including turrets, pinnacles, arched windows, octagonal towers, and buttresses (both regular and flying). Two new wings were added in the first stage, and in the 1820s more wings were added, by this time under the direction of Benjamin Gummow. The interior of the house was as lavish as the exterior, with more Gothic detailing. The hangings for the state bed included 97 yards (89 m) of purple damask and 103 yards (94 m) of sarsenet (fine silk) trimmed with gold lace. When the future Queen Victoria visited in 1832 at the age of 13, she wrote in her journal: "The house is magnificent". Others described it as being "as extravagant and opulent as the very latest upholsterer-decorators could make it". A critic found it "the most gaudy concern I ever saw" and "a vast pile of mongrel gothic which ... is a monument of wealth, ignorance and bad taste". Richard Grosvenor, 2nd Marquess of Westminster, succeeded his father in 1845 and commissioned the Scottish architect William Burn to make alterations to the house. Burn raised the centre of the south front to make it look like a tower, and changed some of the external Gothic features. The architectural historian Nikolaus Pevsner described this house as a "spectacular Gothic mansion".

=== Waterhouse Hall ===
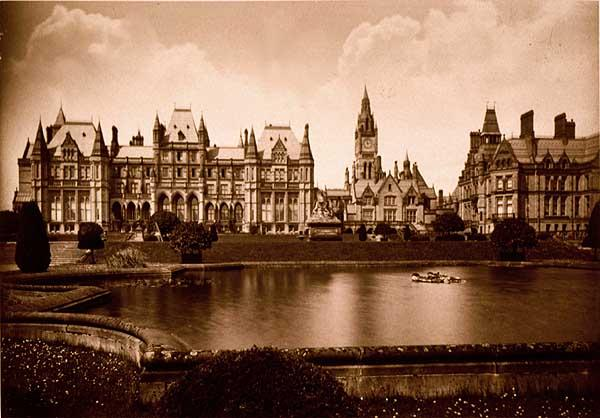
The garden front of the Waterhouse Hall about 1880 showing the main block on the left, the family wing on the right, and the clock tower of the chapel between them

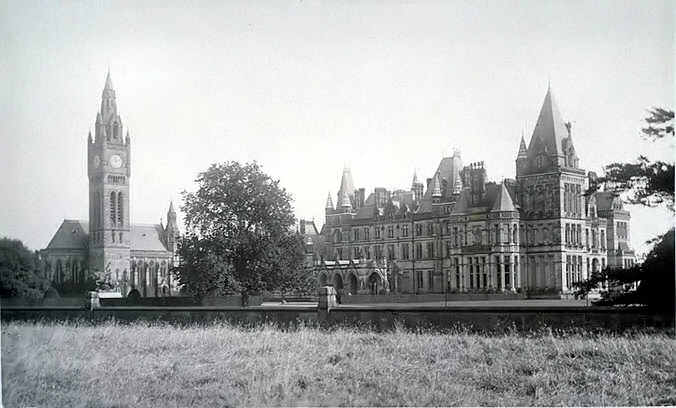
The entrance front of the Waterhouse Hall about 1907 showing the main block on the right and the chapel on the left, photographed by John Steggall

The 2nd Marquess died in 1869 and was succeeded by his son Hugh Lupus Grosvenor, initially the 3rd Marquess and from 1874 the 1st Duke of Westminster. He appointed Alfred Waterhouse to design another new hall. Again the core of the previous hall was retained; parts were refaced and re-modelled, other parts were completely rebuilt. A private wing was built for the use of the family, and this was joined to the main part of the hall by a corridor. Waterhouse also designed the chapel and a clock-house, and rebuilt most of the stabling. The work began in 1870, took 12 years to complete, and cost £803,000 (equivalent to £83,520,000 in 2025). The library was 90 feet (27 m) long, the dining room with its ante room was 105 feet (32 m) long, and the octagonal great hall contained an organ. For the interior, Henry Stacy Marks painted a frieze of the Canterbury Pilgrims for the morning room, Gertrude Jekyll painted panels for the drawing room, and in other rooms were paintings by Gainsborough, Stubbs and Reynolds. Pevsner wrote that it "was an outstanding expression of High Victorian originality", and added "this Wagnerian palace was the most ambitious instance of Gothic Revival domestic architecture anywhere in the country". The Daily Telegraph described it as "one of the most princely and beautiful mansions that these islands contain".

In 1902 the 2nd Duke gave the large alabaster, porphyry and green serpentine chimneypiece from the Ante-Drawing Room as a wedding present to his sister Lettice, Countess Beauchamp. In 1910 it was carefully dismantled and re-erected at her house, Madresfield Court, Malvern, by the architect Randall Wells, to become the focus of his new top-lit Staircase Hall, where it survives.

During both World Wars, parts of the hall were used as a hospital. In 1943, the Britannia Royal Naval College moved to the hall from Dartmouth when the college there was bombed. It moved back to Dartmouth in 1946, after which the hall was used as an officer cadet training unit until the end of National Service in 1958.

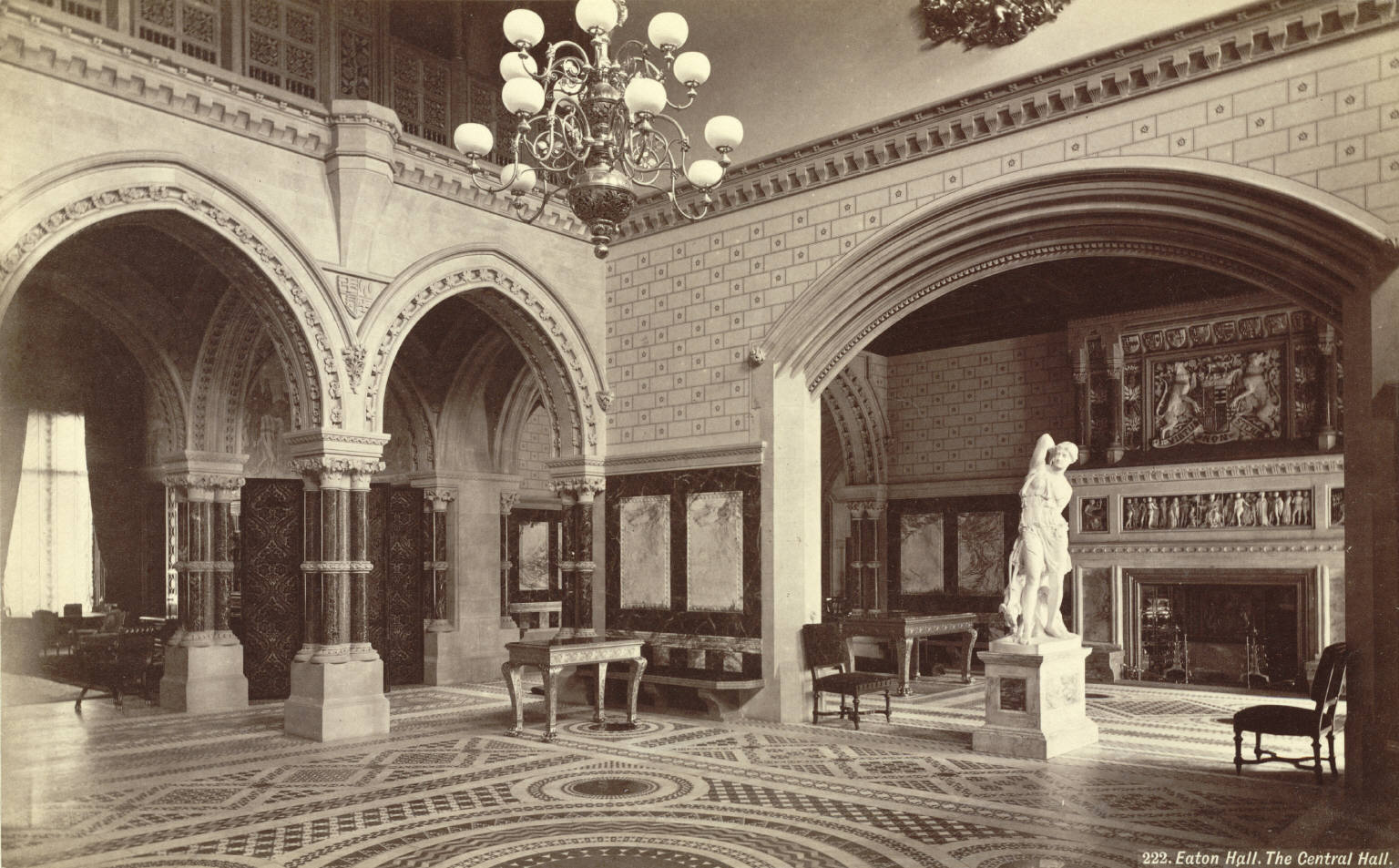
Waterhouse's Central Hall

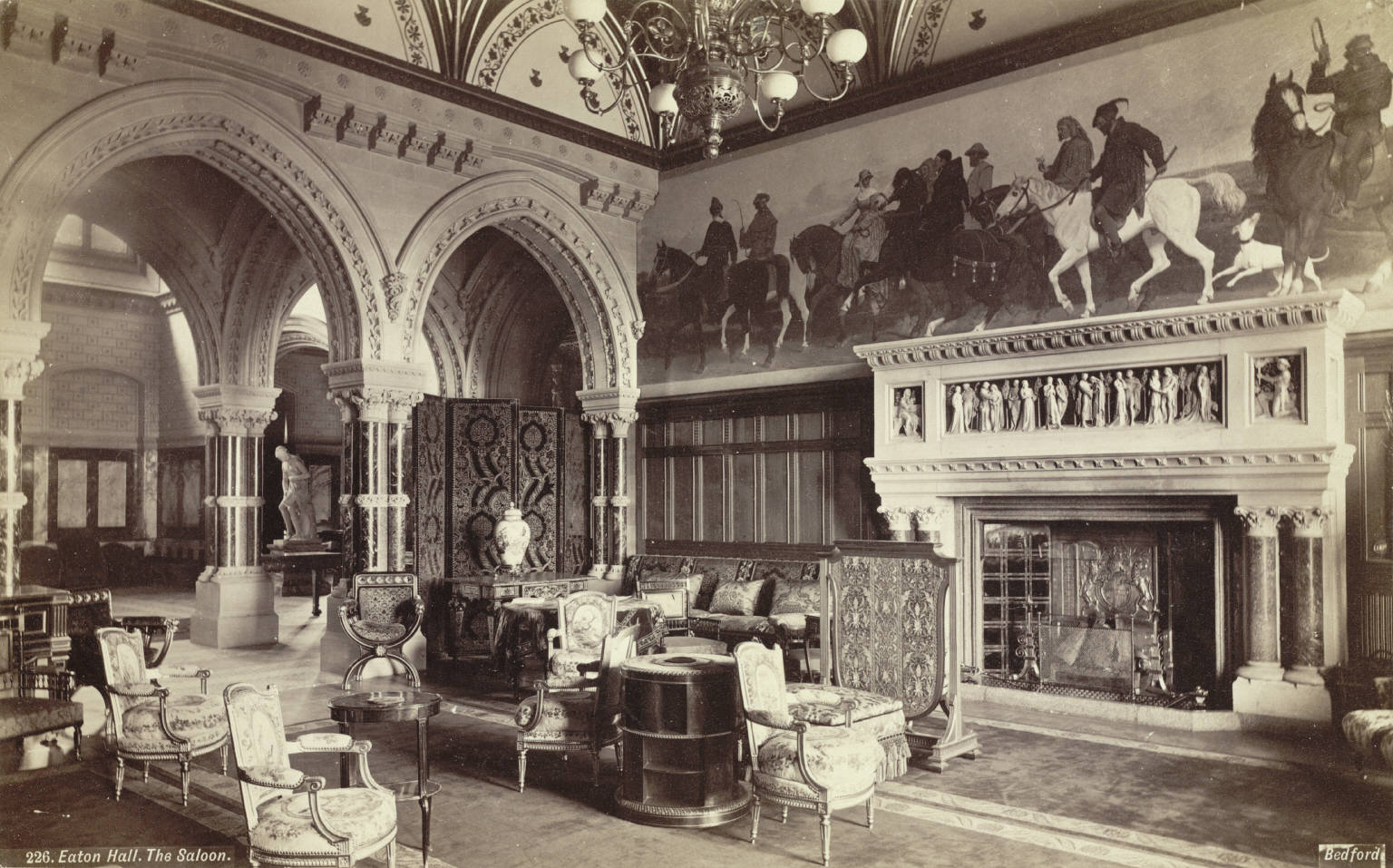
Waterhouse's Saloon

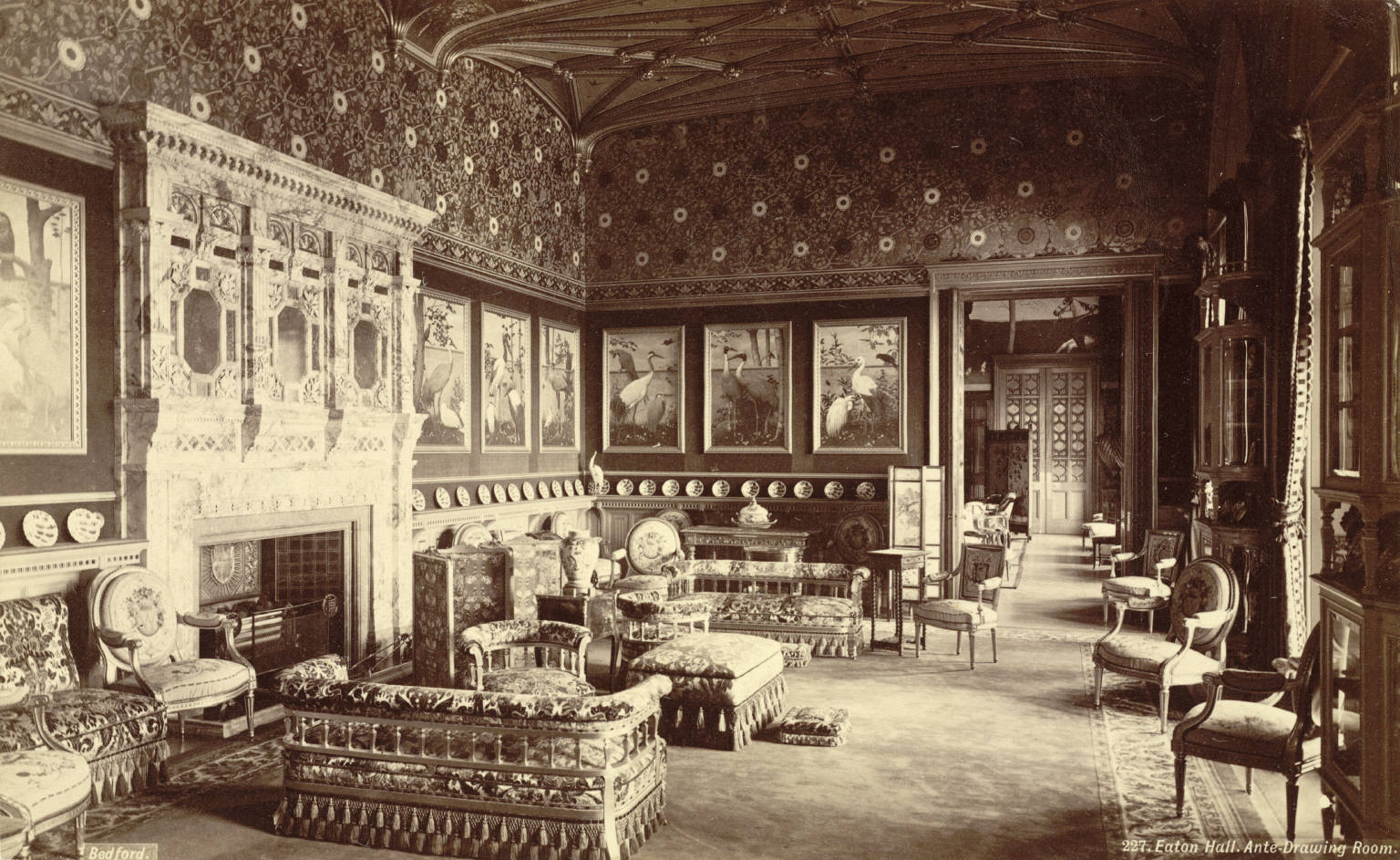
Waterhouse's Ante-Drawing Room

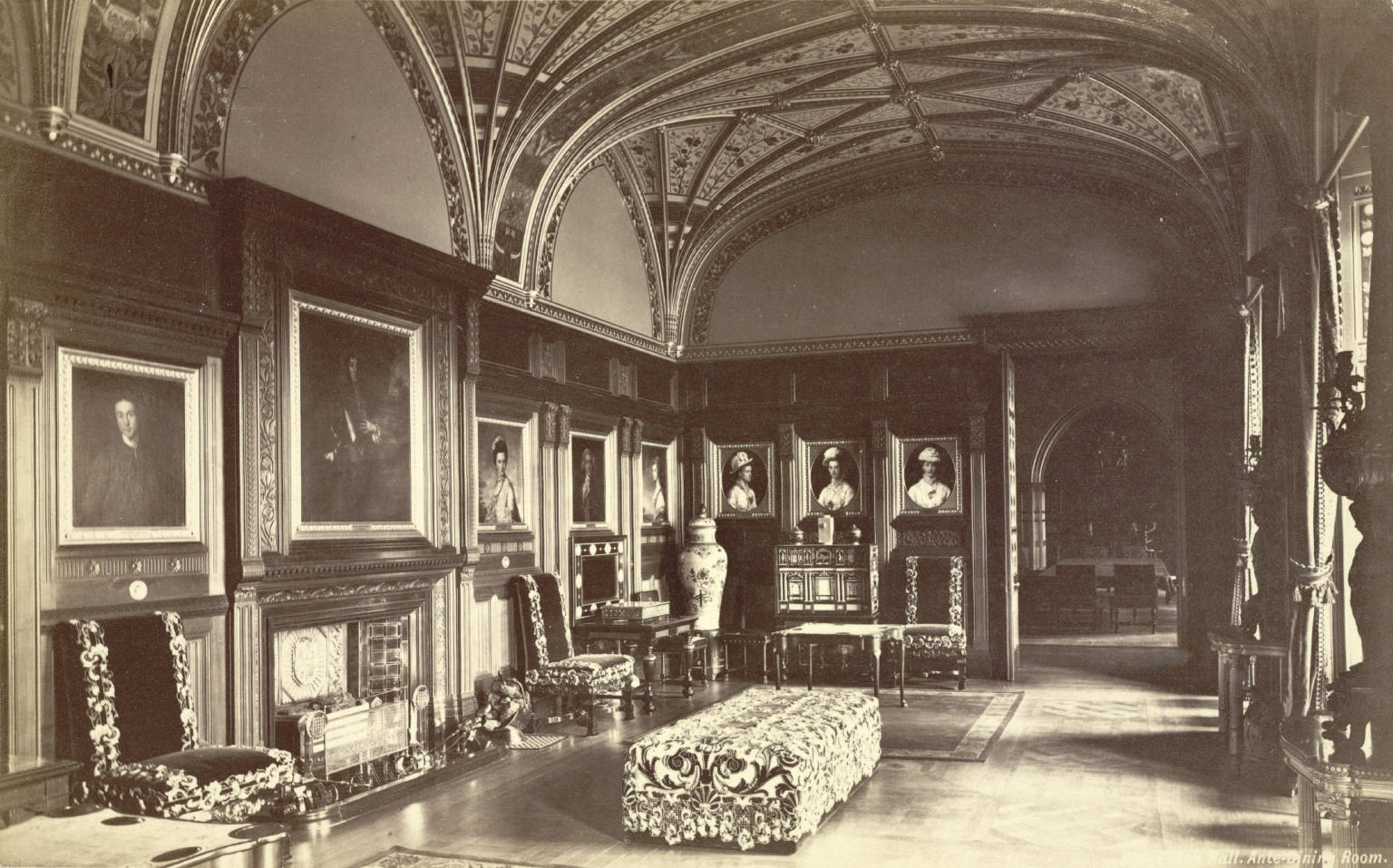
Waterhouse's Ante-Dining Room

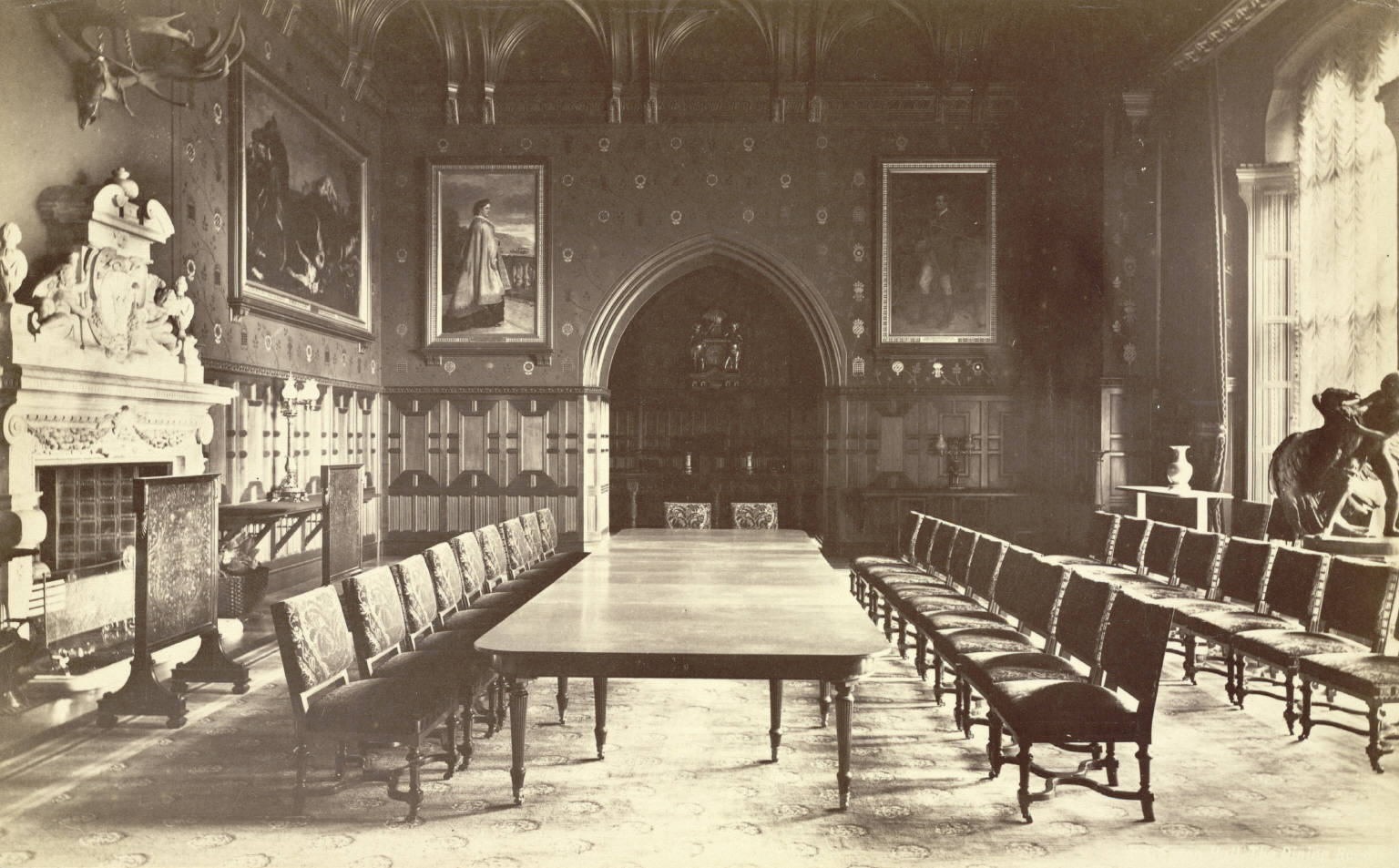
Waterhouse's Dining Room

=== Dennys Hall and the present hall ===
By 1960 the hall needed repair and decoration, and dry rot was found in the roof. In 1963 Gerald Grosvenor, 4th Duke of Westminster, decided to demolish the main part of the Waterhouse building and the private wing whilst retaining the chapel, clock tower and stables. A new building was commissioned by the Duke, who appointed John Dennys, his wife's brother-in-law, as architect. Dennys had earlier worked on Saighton Grange on the Eaton estate.

The intention was to build a modern, manageable home. The result was a rectangular, flat-roofed building, faced with white Travertine, its "whiteness [being] a stark contrast to the softness of the Cheshire landscape". Its construction began in 1971, it took less than 2 1/2 years to build, and cost £459,000 (equivalent to £5,380,000 in 2025). The exterior had a central porte-cochère on the entrance front. The house followed an asymmetrical plan, with two storeys plus a basement containing a swimming pool. A central two-storey hall gave access to the principal rooms, with the main reception rooms being on the first floor. The decor included wall coverings in silk and woodblock floors.

Subsequently, the Dennys Hall was considered to be unsympathetic to its setting, and it was decided to change its exterior. This was undertaken by the Percy Thomas Partnership. Work on recasing the Dennys Hall to make it look more like a French château began in 1989 and was completed in 1991. The result has not been widely praised; the 2011 Cheshire volume in the Pevsner Buildings of England series describes the building as "Château style, (Waterhouse's) Eaton style, but also Tesco style".

=== Associated structures ===
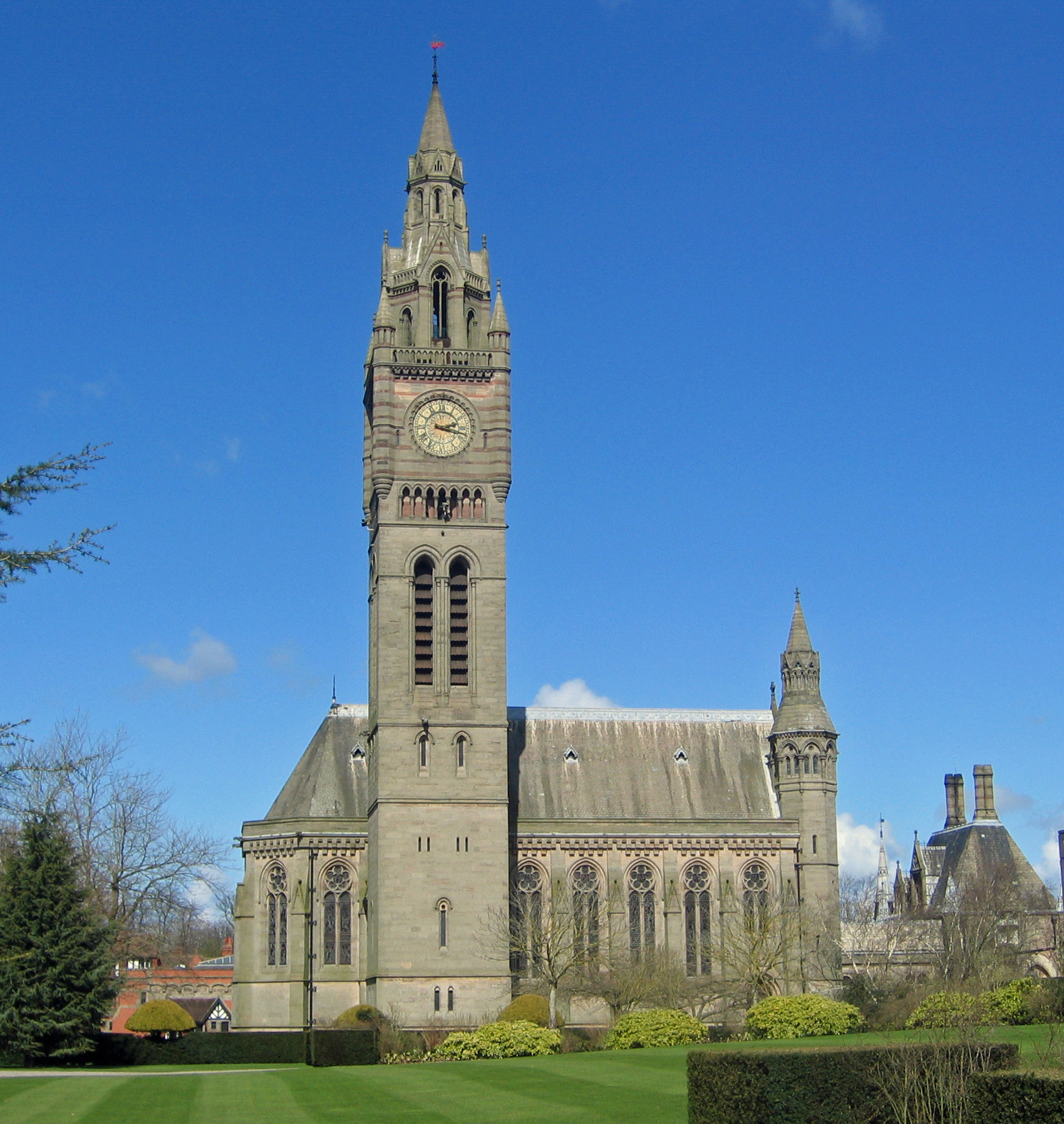
Eaton Chapel from the south

Adjacent to the hall are the remaining structures designed by Waterhouse. To the north is Eaton Chapel; this, with its clock tower, is a Grade I listed building. The decorative scheme of the interior of the chapel is based on the 'Te Deum'; it involves stained glass and stone mosaic, and was developed by Frederic Shields. Immediately to the north of the chapel is the Stable Court; this is listed at Grade II*. The buildings in the Stable Court are in brick, red stone, and half-timbering, with red tile roofs. The west range has a half-timbered upper storey with two gables, and a central gatehouse with turrets which are polygonal at the base and circular higher up and have conical roofs. On each side of the gatehouse are two-storey arcades with gables above. In the courtyard is a statue of a horse by Joseph Boehm, which is listed at Grade II. At the southeast corner of the stable yard is a postillion's house, dated 1873 and listed at Grade II*. In a lobby between the stable yard and the chapel is an artificial grotto, listed at Grade II. In the area around the Stable Court are further structures listed at Grade II. To the north is the Coachhouse Court, which consists of a coach-house, a covered court and a riding school. These were designed in the 1870s for the 1st Duke. To the north of this are Eaton Hall Cottages, four attached cottages, which were designed about the same time. In the forecourt between the Coachhouse Court and the cottages is a lodge, with gates, piers and screens. Near to the cottages is the former engine shed of the Eaton Hall Railway. To the east of the stable yard is a chapel-like sandstone game pantry dating from the 1870s.

From 1896 until 1947, the estate was served by the 15 in (381 mm) gauge Eaton Hall Railway. The line ran from the hall to a depot at Balderton on the Chester-Wrexham line, and a spur went to Cuckoo's Nest, where there was a repair yard. Part of the old railway route was re-opened in 1996.

== Grounds ==
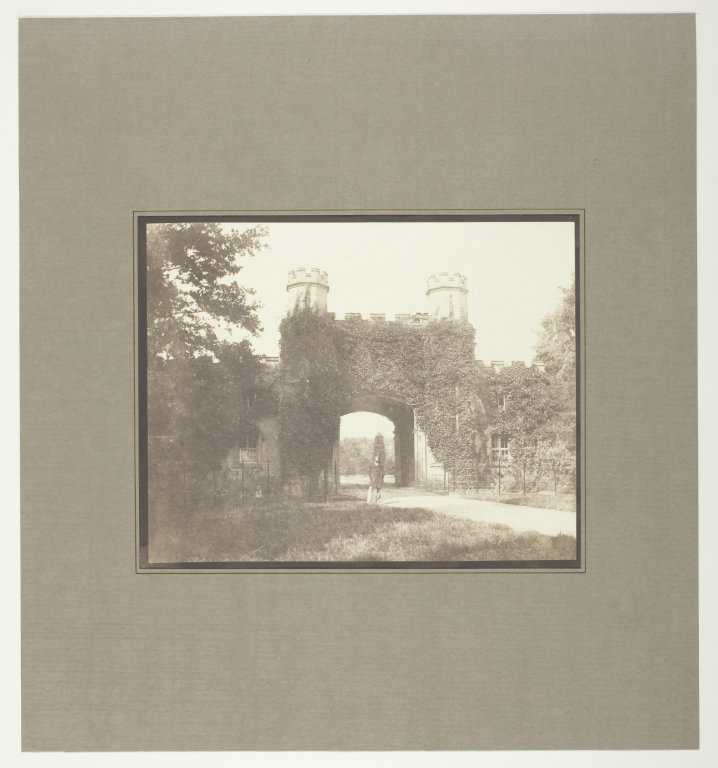
Entrance Lodge, Eaton Hall, Cheshire by Henry Fox Talbot, c. 1845.

The estate covers an area of about 10,872 acres (4,400 ha), within which about 1,235 acres (500 ha) of parkland and about 50 acres (20 ha) of formal gardens. These are listed at Grade II* on the National Register of Historic Parks and Gardens. The boundaries of the estate generally follow field boundaries but on the east side they follow the line of the River Dee.

=== History ===
In the 17th century, formal gardens were created around the Samwell Hall; these included such features as parterres and canals. However they were costly to maintain, and in the later part of the 18th century fashions changed to favour a more informal type of garden layout. Credit for designing the informal gardens at Eaton Hall has been given to Lancelot "Capability" Brown. Although one of Brown's documents dated 1764 shows that payment was made to him by the estate, it also notes that a plan for the garden had been drawn up by William Emes. From this, Marion Mako concludes that, as Brown was an engineer as well as a landscape gardener, the payment was for an engineering project rather than for landscaping. Emes had been influenced by Brown, although he had not been his pupil. With his clerk of works, Thomas Leggett, Emes worked in the estate for the next 10 years. When Robert Grosvenor (later the 1st Marquess) inherited the estate at the beginning of the 19th century, it had become run-down. The marquess appointed John Webb, a pupil of Emes, to improve the garden and the landscaping. Among Webb's innovations were new terrace walls behind the house, the levelling of Belgrave Avenue and the planting of 130,000 trees along it, and a serpentine lake to the east of the house alongside the River Dee. He also arranged for the construction of greenhouses and a kitchen garden.

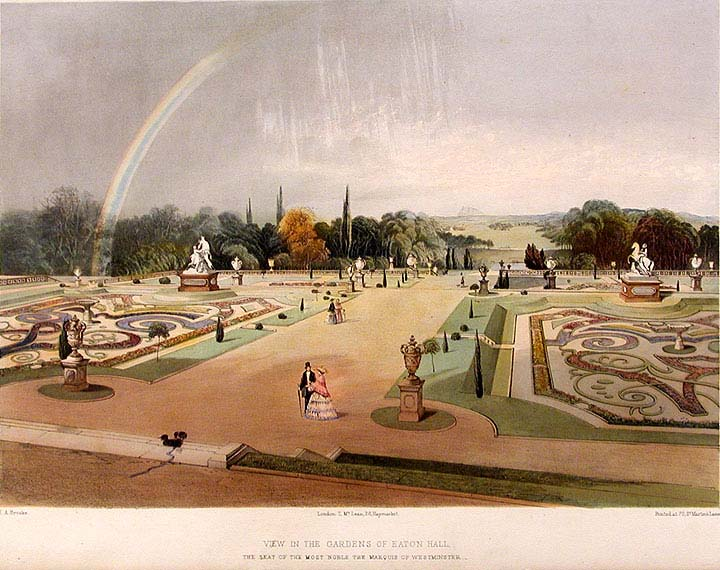
Formal garden in the mid-19th century

Fashions changed again, and in the 1820s William Andrews Nesfield was employed to design new parterres. He also built more terracing and a balustraded wall. Statues, stone urns and vases on pedestals were added to the garden. In 1852 the Camellia House was built; this was extended in 1870 to its final size of 385 feet (117 m) long, 10 feet (3 m) wide, and 18 feet (5 m) high. The present kitchen garden was created the same year; this provided the food not only for the hall, but also for Grosvenor House in London. More greenhouses were built and, by about 1880, 56 gardeners were employed. There were other building works in the grounds. Waterhouse created a grotto between the chapel and the stable yard, and designed the Parrot House and a loggia (now known as the Temple). The Chester architect John Douglas designed the Dutch Tea House in the Tea Garden, and a number of service buildings in the estate. In 1897–98 Edwin Lutyens started to improve what had been known as the Italian Garden (and is now the Dragon Garden).

Work continued in the gardens and grounds during the 20th century. The 2nd Duke commissioned Detmar Blow, a pupil of Lutyens, to re-design parts of the gardens. With Fernand Billerey, he removed the parterres, built a canal leading away from the house, added hedged compartments to the terraces, and a pond at the base of the terraces (now the Lioness and Kudu Pond). During the Second World War, part of the parkland was requisitioned as an airfield for RAF Poulton, and in 1940 some of the garden buildings were damaged by a cluster of incendiary devices. After the war, improvement of the gardens did not resume until the 1960s, when the wives of the 4th and 5th Dukes worked with the designer James Russell. Since the early 1990s, the gardens have been further developed under the 6th Duke and his wife, Natalia, working with the garden designers Arabella Lennox-Boyd and Vernon Russell Smith.

=== Formal gardens ===
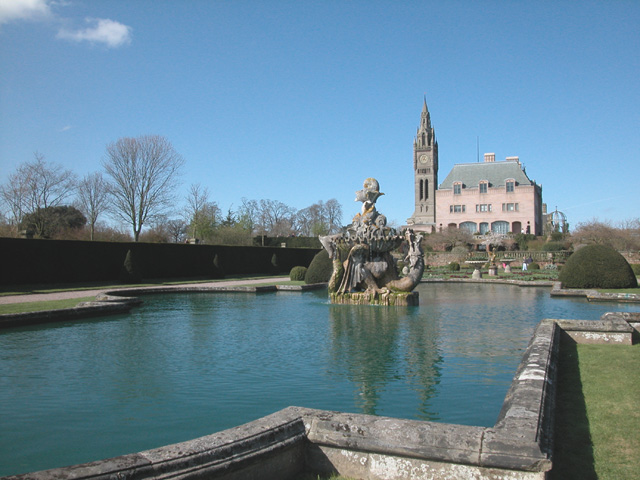
Eaton Hall from the Italian Garden in 2006

To the east of the house a series of terraces leads down to the Fish Pond. The retaining walls at the southern end of the upper terrace are listed at Grade II, as are the retaining walls at the end of the upper terrace and the steps leading down to the middle terrace. Stretching along the middle terrace is a long rectangular pool containing a three fountains. The retaining walls of this pool are listed at Grade II, as are the railings on the north and the south side of the terrace. On each side of the pool are two compartments framed by yew hedges. Between these compartments, on each side, is a statue by Raymond Smith. Both of these were made in 1852 for the 2nd Marquess and are listed at Grade II. The one to the north depicts a stag at bay, and that to the south a hunter on a rearing horse.

From the end of the pool, steps lead down to a smaller rectangular pool at right-angles to the first. The steps and the retaining wall at the end of the terrace are listed at Grade II. The retaining walls of the pool are also listed at Grade II. This area contains two statues by Jonathan Kenworthy. From this pool a path, known as the Broad Walk, stretches to the north and the south. At each end of the Broad Walk is a building designed by Waterhouse for the 3rd Marquess. At the north end is the Parrot House, dating from 1881–83, which is built in yellow terracotta. It is the form of a round colonnaded Ionic temple with a shallow domed roof. Above the colonnade and the inner drum are concentric balustrades. A flight of eleven steps leads up to the south entrance. The Parrot House is listed at Grade II. At the south end of the Broad Walk is a loggia, dating from about 1880. This is built in buff and red sandstone. At its front are three arches between Ionic columns. The loggia was built to enclose a Roman altar which was found in 1821 at a spring near Boughton and brought to Eaton in 1822. The loggia is listed at Grade II. To the east and west of the loggia are reconstructed Roman columns, each of which is listed at Grade II.

South of the loggia is the Dutch Tea Garden, which was laid out by C. E. Mallows in about 1905. The garden contains the Tea House which was designed by John Douglas. This has a cruciform plan and is a half-timbered building on a sandstone plinth. The roof is of red tiles, and sweeps upwards to a small spire surmounted by a weathercock. It is listed at Grade II. In the centre of the garden is a statue of Mercury and in front of the Tea House are two stone Talbots. To the north of the Tea House, on the path leading to the Broad Walk, is a pair of wrought iron gates made in 1913 for the 2nd Duke. The gates and their overthrow are listed at Grade II.

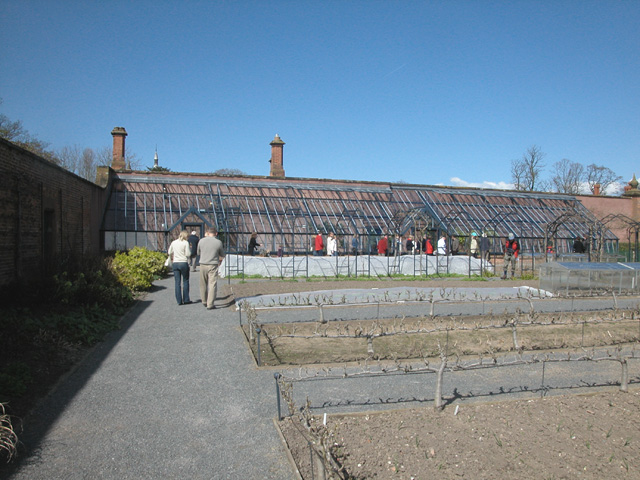
Kitchen Garden

To the south of the hall is a formal garden known as the Italian Garden. This contains a pool at the centre of which is the Dragon Fountain. The fountain is listed at Grade II. In the Italian Garden are two statues, also listed at Grade II, which were taken from the old hall when it was demolished; these are a statue of Joan of Eaton, and of the Norman Bishop Odo.

Leading from the north of the house is the Spring Walk, leading to the Kitchen Garden, in which food is grown for the family. To the east of the Kitchen Garden is the Camellia Walk, a long greenhouse filled with camellias. This is 388 feet (118 m) long and is believed to be the longest glass corridor in the world. It is listed at Grade II. Some of the gates in this garden are believed to have been designed by Lutyens, and are listed at Grade II. Other walls and gates around the garden were designed by Waterhouse in about 1870, and are listed at Grade II*.

To the east of the house is the forecourt, which has as its centrepiece a pool containing an equestrian statue of the 1st Duke. This depicts the Duke on horseback holding aloft a falcon. It is in bronze and was made between 1870 and 1879 for the Duke by G. F. Watts. It is listed at Grade II*. The retaining walls of the pond are listed at Grade II. To the west of the forecourt are the Golden Gates which, together with their screens and lodges, are listed at Grade I. The other listed building in the gardens is a large stone urn on the east side of the Fish Pool dating from about 1880. This is richly carved, is 10 feet (3 m) high, and stands on a circular pedestal which forms the final feature of the eastern view from the hall. It is listed at Grade II.

=== Other features ===
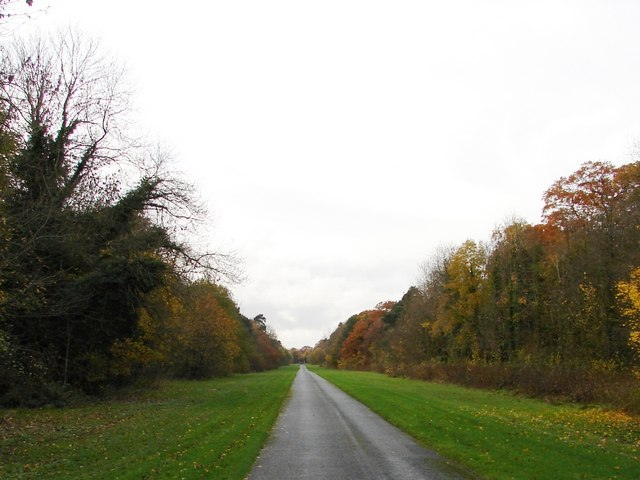
View along Belgrave Avenue

The grounds can be entered by a number of approaches, each of which contain structures of architectural importance. Belgrave Avenue, some 1.75 miles (3 km) long, is a straight drive which leads from the Wrexham Road (B5445) to the Golden Gates and the forecourt on the east of the hall. Belgrave Lodge, on the south side of the avenue was built in 1899 to a design by John Douglas for the 1st Duke. It is built in red bricks with yellow stone plinths, bands and other dressings and is listed at Grade II. The associated lodge gates, piers and wing walls were designed at the same time by Douglas and are also listed at Grade II. Part way along the avenue, on its north side, is Upper Belgrave Lodge. This was also designed by Douglas for the 1st Duke, it is dated 1877, and is Grade II listed. Further along the avenue is a Grade II listed obelisk in red sandstone with a copper cap, dated 1890, designed by Douglas and Fordham.

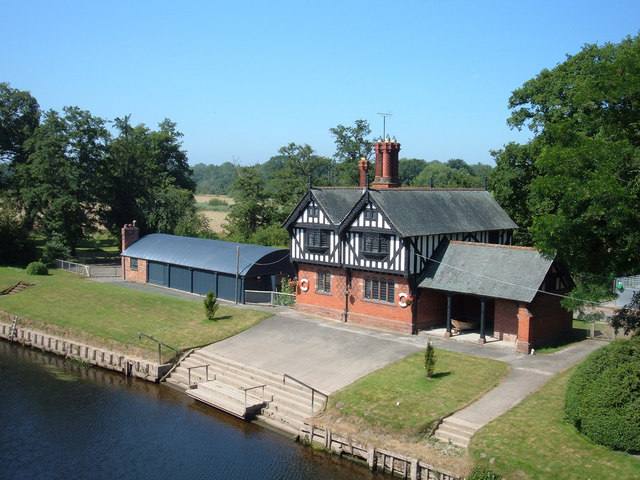
Iron Bridge Lodge

The Aldford Approach leads from the village of Aldford and crosses the River Dee by the Grade I listed Aldford Iron Bridge, which was built in 1824 by William Hazledine for the 1st Marquess. Iron Bridge Lodge, adjacent to this bridge, was designed by Douglas and Fordham in 1894 and is listed at Grade II. Also on this approach is Coachmore Hill Lodge which was designed in the 1880s by Douglas; it is listed at Grade II. On the approach, near the Dutch Tea Garden are gates with an overthrow, and piers dating from about 1870 in Classic Revival style, listed at Grade II.

From the north of the hall are two further approaches. The Eccleston Approach goes to the village of Eccleston, and slightly to the west, the Chester Approach bypasses the village, going through Eccleston Hill. Associated with these approaches are further listed buildings. Of these, the major structure is Eccleston Hill Lodge which was designed in 1881–82 by Douglas for the 1st Duke and is listed at Grade II*. This is a three-storey gatehouse tower with multiple attached smaller towers and a steeply hipped roof. The other structures are listed at Grade II and comprise Eccleston Lodge which was designed by Douglas and Fordham in 1894, its associated gates, piers and wing railings, a sandstone balustered causeway south of the lodge carrying the drive, a house called Eaton Boat, designed by Douglas about 1880, Garden Lodge designed by Waterhouse in 1881–83, a pair of gates, railings and screen walls adjoining the lodge dating from 1881–83 by Waterhouse, Stud Lodge storehouse and domestic offices, designed in 1883 by Douglas, the Stud Riding School, the Stud Stables, the house east of Stud, Eaton Estate Office, designed by Waterhouse in 1880, the North Lodge of 1881 by Waterhouse, the North Lodge gate and post from about 1881 also by Waterhouse, the Garden House of 1893 by Douglas and Minshull, and gates and gate piers to the south of Garden House.

== Present day ==
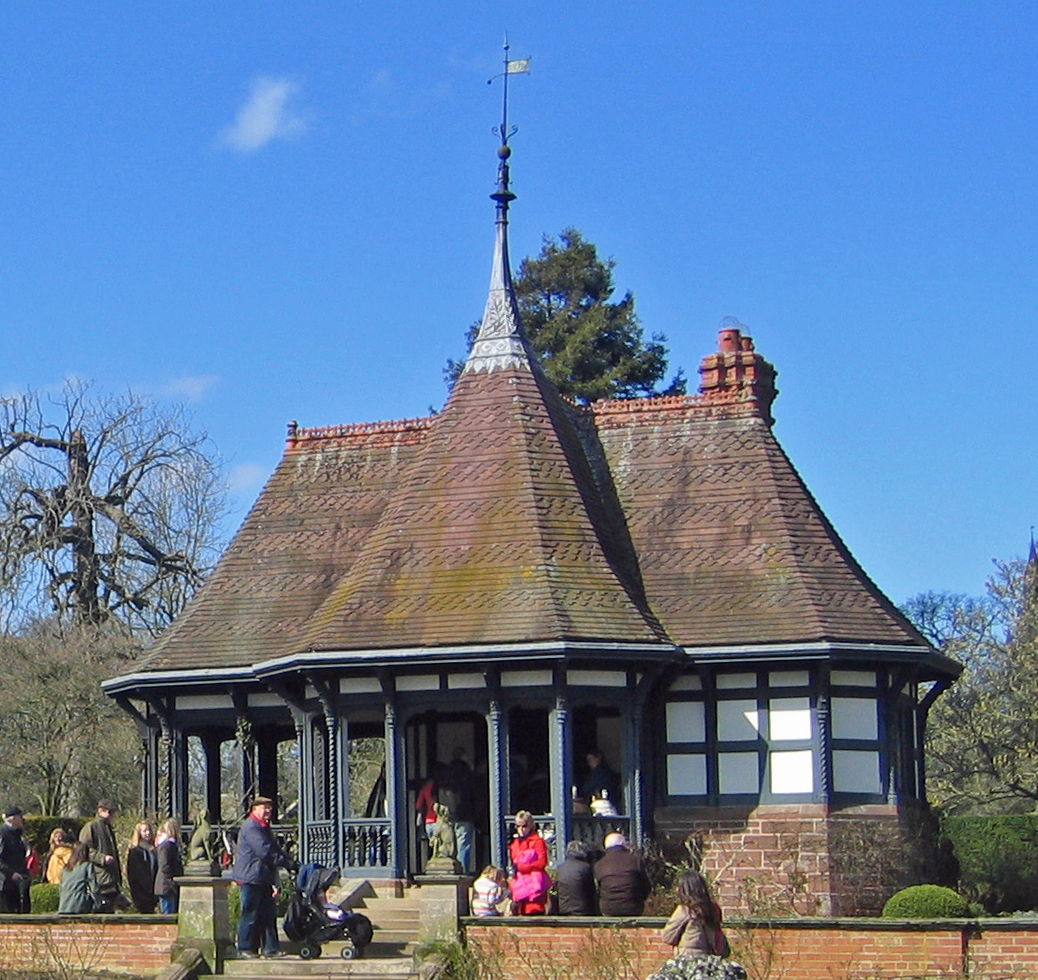
Dutch Tea House on an open day in 2010

Eaton Hall is a private residence and is not open to the public, but the gardens are open three days each year to raise money for charity. In the area of the Stable Court are a number of rooms which are used for exhibitions. The Carriage Museum holds the Westminster Collection of Carriages. The Exhibition Room houses a collection of items relating to the Grosvenor family, and the History Room contains items about the history of the family and illustrations of the hall at various stages in the past. The Stables include items relating to the family's horses. In the garden, the Parrot House contains an exhibition of paintings by the Victorian artist Henry Stacy Marks.

Some of the areas in the stable court are available for hire for charitable fund raising. The Long Room, which was refurbished in 1992 and now has the character of a large country house drawing room, can hold 150 people. The former saddle room is now a dining room. The carriage room and adjoining buildings have been converted into the Wolf Room, which has a movable stage and audio-visual facilities. It can seat 200 people and contains eight black-chalk pictures of birds by Joseph Wolf. The chapel is usually reserved for the family but in December each year it is used for carol concerts to raise money for charity.

== See also ==
- Eaton Hall Railway
- Grade I listed buildings in Cheshire West and Chester
- Listed buildings in Eaton, Cheshire West and Chester
- Grosvenor Group

== Notes and references ==
Notes

Bibliography

- Anon. (2002), Eaton Halls, Eaton: Eaton Estate
- de Figueiredo, Peter; Treuherz, Julian (1988), Cheshire Country Houses, Chichester: Phillimore, ISBN 978-0-85033-655-9
- Groves, Linden (2004), Historic Parks & Gardens of Cheshire, Ashbourne: Landmark, ISBN 978-1-84306-124-3
- Newton, Diana; Lumby, Jonathan (2002), The Grosvenors of Eaton, Eccleston, Cheshire: Jennet Publications, ISBN 978-0-9543379-0-2
- Mako, Marion (2009), The Gardens at Eaton Hall, Eaton: Eaton Estate
- Ormerod, George; Thomas Helsby (Ed.) (1882), The History of the County Palatine and City of Chester (2nd ed.), London: George Routledge and Sons
- Pevsner, Nikolaus; Hubbard, Edward (2003) [1971], Cheshire, The Buildings of England, New Haven and London: Yale University Press, ISBN 978-0-300-09588-3
- Hartwell, Clare; Hyde, Matthew; Hubbard, Edward; Pevsner, Nikolaus (2011) [1971], Cheshire, The Buildings of England, New Haven and London: Yale University Press, ISBN 978-0-300-17043-6
- Taylor, Keith; Stewart, Brian (2006), Call to Arms: Officer Cadet Training at Eaton Hall 1943-1958, ISBN 978-0-9554528-0-2
