= Overthrow (structure) =

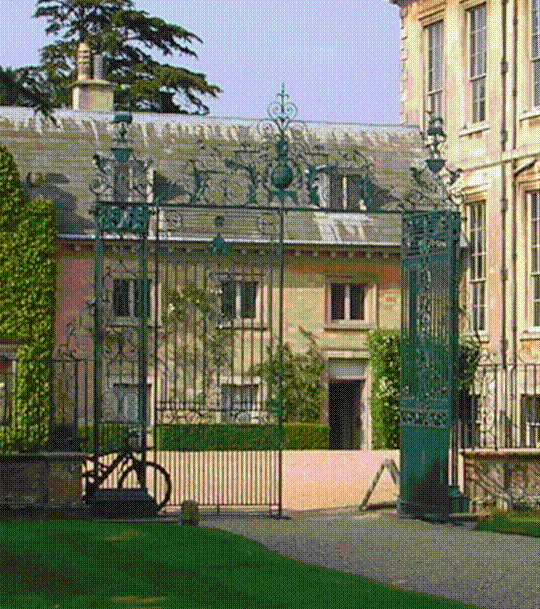
Belton House, Lincolnshire: the overthrow is the section of ironwork which passes over the gate itself, connecting the piers

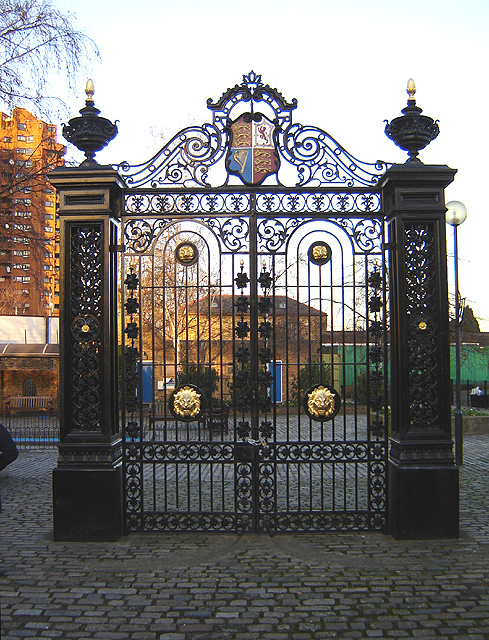
Mid-19th century Neo-baroque gates with overthrow from Cremorne Gardens, London

In wrought ironwork, the overthrow, particularly popular in the Baroque era commencing in the 17th century, refers to the crowning section of ornamental wrought ironwork which forms a decorative crest above a wrought-iron gate; the overthrow provides some stabilizing structure tying together supporting piers on either side of the swinging sections. The piers may be masonry or of assembled sections of wrought iron. Aside from this stabilizing feature, the overthrow was largely freed of constraints of barring passage of animals or people. Consequently, the iron master was free to express his fancy. Overthrows often feature monograms or cyphers, armorial crests or supporters, and even fully realized coats of arms.

== Examples ==
Some outstanding English and Welsh examples of overthrows:

- Chirk Castle, Denbigh. 1719. By Robert Davies, a pupil of Jean Tijou.
- Leeswood, Mold, Clwyd. The "White Gates". 1726 By Robert Davies.
- Eaton Hall, Cheshire. Golden Gates. c. 1730. By the Davies Brothers of Croes Foel.
- Okeover Hall, Staffordshire. 1756. By Benjamin Yates, a pupil of Robert Bakewell
- Clandon Park House, Surrey. 18th century. Installed by Lancelot 'Capability' Brown.
