= Listed buildings in Southwell, Nottinghamshire =

Southwell is a civil parish in the Newark and Sherwood district of Nottinghamshire, England. The parish contains over 240 listed buildings that are recorded in the National Heritage List for England. Of these, two are listed at Grade I, the highest of the three grades, five are at Grade II*, the middle grade, and the others are at Grade II, the lowest grade. The parish includes the market town of Southwell and the surrounding area, including the hamlet of Brinkley. The most important buildings in the parish are Southwell Minster, and the Bishop's Manor and the remains of Bishop's Palace, both listed at Grade I. Associated with the Minster are a number of other listed buildings, including prebends (houses occupied by prebendaries of the Minster).

Most of the other listed buildings are houses, cottages and associated structures, shops and offices. The rest include churches and associated structures, farmhouses and farm buildings, hotels and public houses, a milestone, a former spinning mill and associated structures, a former grammar school, a bridge, civic buildings, a former Sunday school, a war memorial and three telephone kiosks.

== Key ==
| Grade | Criteria |
|---|---|
| I | Buildings of exceptional interest, sometimes considered to be internationally important |
| II* | Particularly important buildings of more than special interest |
| II | Buildings of national importance and special interest |

== Buildings ==
| Name and location | Photograph | Date | Notes | Grade |
|---|---|---|---|---|
| Southwell Minster and chapter house 53.07686°N 0.95399°W | | c. 1120 | The minster has been altered and extended through the centuries, the chapter house was added between 1290 and 1300, and there have been restorations particularly in the 19th century. The minster is built in stone with lead roofs, and consists of a nave with a clerestory and twin west towers, north and south aisles, a north porch, north and south transepts, a tower at the crossing, a choir with chapels, a pilgrim chapel, a cloister and a vestibule, and a chapter house. The west towers are square with six stages, flat angle buttresses, blind arcading, corbel tables and square spires. Between the towers is a Romanesque doorway with four orders, above which is a seven-light Perpendicular window, and an embattled parapet. The north porch has a coped gable with a beast finial and pinnacles with conical caps, and it contains a round-arched doorway with a moulded, surround, two orders and a hood mould, above which are three round-headed windows. The chapter house is octagonal and has gabled angle buttresses rising to crocketed pinnacles, and a pierced balustrade with quatrefoils. | I |
| Gateway and churchyard walls, Southwell Minster; 53.07721°N 0.95582°W | | Mid 14th century | The gateway is in stone with gabled coping, and it contains a double chamfered round arch with chamfered imposts. The walls are stepped and gabled. At the top is a finial with a pyramidal roof, and on its east and west sides are cusped niches, each with an ogee hood mould. The flanking churchyard walls curve to square piers with pyramidal caps, and beyond are straight sections, each about 15 metres (49 ft) long. | II* |
| Gateways and boundary wall, Southwell Minster; 53.07743°N 0.95386°W | | 14th century | The wall enclosing the churchyard is in stone with gabled coping, and it extends for about 120 metres (390 ft). It contains two gateways, each with a stepped flat-topped gable and a plain round-headed opening. The left gateway is larger, and contains a pair of wrought iron carriage gates, and the other gateway has a gate for walkers. | II |
| Bishop's Manor and remains of Bishop's Palace; 53.07641°N 0.95424°W | | c. 1379 | The Bishop's Palace was extended in the 15th century, largely demolished in the 17th century, and is now a ruin. A house was built in the former great hall in the 18th century. The ruin is roofless, it consists of walls around four sides of a courtyard, and includes garderobe towers and a stair turret. The Bishop's Manor, incorporating the previous house and some of the Palace, was built in 1907–09, and designed by W. D. Caröe. The Manor is roughcast and colourwashed, on a plinth, and has a tile roof. The entrance front has three storeys and eight bays, and has a three-storey tower porch with diagonal buttresses and a segmental-haded doorway. In the south side is a block with two storeys and three bays, containing a two-storey bay window, and a central 14th-century doorway with a moulded surround. Most of the windows are mullioned or are cross windows. | I |
| South Muskham Prebend; 53.07667°N 0.95136°W | | Mid 15th century | A prebend house that was remodelled in the early 18th century and in about 1800, later a private house, it has a timber-framed core, encased in rendered and colourwashed brick, on a plinth, with stone dressings, and roofs in slate and tile with coped gables. There are two storeys and an H-shaped plan, with a middle range of four bays and cross wings. Along the front is a verandah with iron posts and a crest, and inside it is a doorway. The windows are sashes. | II |
| Saracen's Head Hotel; 53.07804°N 0.95543°W | | c. 1460 | A hotel to which an assembly room was added in 1805. The hotel is in close studded timber framing with rendered nogging, a colourwashed brick underbuild, on a plinth, and with roofs of slate and pantile. There are two storeys, a U-shaped plan with long rear wings, and a front of five bays. On the front is a carriage opening and sash windows. To the left is the façade of the assembly rooms. This is in brick, the ground floor colourwashed, on a plinth, with a moulded sill band, coved eaves, and a hipped slate roof. There are three storeys and four bays. In the centre is a Doric portico infilled with windows. The windows elsewhere are sashes with multi-keystoned lintels. | II* |
| 6 Market Place; 53.07817°N 0.95528°W | | Early 16th century | A house to which a rear wing was added in the early 18th century, later a shop, it is in brick, the north gable is timber framed with rendered nogging, and the rear wing is colourwashed. It has a plinth, stone dressings, a coped parapet and slate roofs. There are two storeys and three bays. In the ground floor is an early 19th-century shop front with reeded pilasters and paterae, containing a doorway with a fanlight flanked by windows with Gothic glazing. The upper floor contains sash windows with splayed lintels, and in the rear wing is a doorway, a shop window and casement windows. | II |
| 40 and 42 Westhorpe; 53.07586°N 0.97063°W | | Early 16th century | Originally an aisled hall house, it has a timber-framed core, it is clad in brick and has a pantile roof. There is a single storey and an attic, and on the front is a lean-to porch. Most of the windows are casements and there is a cross-eaves dormer. Added to the west is a 19th-century brick cottage. It has a single storey and an attic, and contains horizontally-sliding sash windows. | II |
| 64, 64A and 66 King Street; 53.07909°N 0.95258°W | | Early 17th century | Two houses, later three, in brick with some timber framing, roughcast on the front, with a pantile roof. There are two storeys, No. 66 on the left has a single bay, a casement window in each door, and exposed close studding and rendered nogging in the gable. To the right are three bays, a rendered plinth, quoins, and casement windows with Gothic glazing. In the centre is a doorway with a moulded surround and a Tudor arch. | II |
| Dunham House; 53.07703°N 0.95687°W | | Early 17th century | Originally a prebend house, it was remodelled in about 1780, extended in 1805, and later used for other purposes. It is in stuccoed brick with stone dressings, slate roofs and two storeys. The entrance front is symmetrical, with a plinth, a moulded parapet, coped gables, and seven bays. In the centre is a square porch with a segmental-headed opening, a string course, a partly balustraded parapet, and a doorway with a moulded surround, and the windows are sashes. The garden front is irregular, with twelve bays, and contains two two-storey bow windows and two French windows. To the right is a projecting wing with three windows, the middle one with a cast iron balcony. | II |
| Rampton Prebend; 53.07742°N 0.95650°W | | Early 17th century | A prebend house, later a private house, in brick on a plinth, with stone dressings, and roofs of tile and slate with coped gables. There are three storeys and three gabled bays. In the centre is a doorway with a moulded surround, pilasters, a fanlight and a hood. Most of the windows are sashes with segmental heads, and in the top floor of the middle bay is a semicircular window. There is another doorway in the left return. | II |
| 24 and 28 Westhorpe; 53.07590°N 0.96972°W | | Mid 17th century | Three, later two, cottages in brick, with remains of timber framing and pantile roofs. There are two storeys and four bays. The windows are a mix of casements and sashes, some horizontally-sliding, and some have segmental heads. At the rear is exposed close studding with rendered nogging. | II |
| 4 Market Place; 53.07832°N 0.95540°W | | Late 17th century | A house, later extended and used for other purposes, in brick, mainly colourwashed, with a partial plinth, stone dressings, and a pantile roof with moulded stone copings and kneelers at the Queen Street end. There are two storeys and attics, a main range of four bays, and a later two-storey extension. The main doorway has a fanlight, most of the windows are casements, and in the gable end is a shop window. | II |
| 44 Westgate; 53.07529°N 0.95912°W | | Late 17th century | The house, later used for other purposes, may have internal timber framing. It is in brick, rendered at the front with applied timber framing, and has a pantile roof, coped on the right. There are two storeys and two bays. In the ground floor is a doorway flanked by shop windows. The upper floor contains a casement window on the right, and a horizontally-sliding sash window to the left, and further to the left is a re-sited stone gargoyle. In the archway to the left is a doorway. | II |
| Gadsby's of Southwell and Gossips Coffee House; 53.07869°N 0.95427°W | | Late 17th century | A pair of houses, later used for other purposes, in brick, colourwashed on the front, with slate roofs and three storeys. No. 24 on the right is gabled, in the ground floor is a shop front with pilasters, a central doorway flanked by windows, and a corniced fascia. The middle floor contains a canted oriel window, and above it is a sash window with a segmental head. The left bay has cogged eaves, in the ground floor is a shop window and a round-headed entry, and above are sash windows with keystoned lintels. | II |
| Home Farmhouse and barn 53.08621°N 0.94214°W | | Late 17th century | The farmhouse and barn are in brick with pantile roofs. The farmhouse has coped gables and kneelers, two storeys, an L-shaped plan, and a front range of two bays, and to the left is a lower two-storey block. On the front is a porch, and most of the windows are casements, some with segmental heads. The barn is dated 1765 in brickwork, and has cogged eaves, doors and two tiers of vents. | II |
| The Hollies; 53.07920°N 0.95787°W | | Late 17th century | The house is in brick, and has a slate roof with coped gables and kneelers. There are two storeys and attics and an L-shaped plan, with a front range of three bays, and a rear wing. The windows on the front are sashes, and in the gables are sash windows in the lower two floors and casements in the attic, all with segmental heads. | II |
| Westhorpe Lodge; 53.07533°N 0.96810°W | — | Late 17th century | A roughcast house on a plinth, with stone dressings, and a slate roof with coped gables. There are two storeys and five bays. In the south front is a projecting wing with a pedimented gable and a square bay window. To the right of the wing is a hipped bay window, and to the left is an extension containing a doorway with a moulded surround and a fanlight. Most of the windows are sashes with moulded surrounds. | II |
| The Residence, Vicars Court and walls 53.07673°N 0.95246°W | | 1689 | The buildings have been altered and extended through the centuries. They are in brick with stone dressings, and have roofs of tile and slate. The buildings form three sides of a courtyard, with The Residence at the east end, and two houses in line on each side constituting Vicars' Court. The Residence has a plinth, a sill band, an eaves cornice and a balustrade. There are two storeys and a basement, and a front of five bays, the middle three bays projecting under a pediment. In the centre is a Doric doorcase with a pediment. The vicars' houses have plinths, chamfered eaves and hipped roofs. Each has two storeys and attics and five bays, and a central doorway with a fanlight. Most of the windows are sashes, and the vicar's houses have two flat-roofed dormers. There are various linking and boundary walls. | II* |
| 63 King Street; 53.07929°N 0.95270°W | | c. 1700 | A brick cottage, rendered at the front, with a pantile roof. There is a single storey and attics, and two bays. On the left is a doorway, to its right are two casement windows, and in the attic are two gabled dormers with casements. | II |
| 10 Westgate; 53.07652°N 0.95703°W | | c. 1700 | The house, which was altered in the 19th century, is in brick on a plinth, with stone dressings, a sill band, dentilled eaves at the front, cogged eaves at the rear, a parapet, and a tile roof with coped gables. There are two storeys and a dummy attic, four bays, and single-storey extensions on the sides. In the centre is a flat-roofed porch, flanked by canted bay windows with iron crests. The upper floor contains sash windows with segmental heads, and in the attic are dummy windows. | II |
| Cranfield House and walls 53.07773°N 0.95281°W | | 1709 | Originally Oxton I prebend, later a private house, it is in brick on a plinth, with stone dressings, rusticated quoins, a floor band, moulded eaves and a hipped slate roof. There are two storeys and attics, and five bays. In the centre, steps lead up to a doorway with a moulded surround, a fanlight and a segmental pediment. The windows are sashes, the window above the doorway with a segmental pediment breaking into the eaves, and the others with plain surrounds. In the attic are three pedimented dormers. The garden walls are in brick with gabled coping, and on the street side is a central pair of square stone gate piers and wrought iron gates. | II* |
| 37 Easthorpe; 53.07612°N 0.94613°W | | Early 18th century | Two houses, later extended and combined, possibly with a timber-framed core, it is rendered and has a pantile roof. There are two storeys and an L-shaped plan, with a front range of three bays. The doorway has a hood, and the windows are casements. | II |
| 13 and 15 Market Place; 53.07778°N 0.95540°W | | Early 18th century | A pair of houses later used for other purposes, in brick, stuccoed on the front, on a partial stone plinth, with stone dressings, a low coped parapet, and a slate roof with coped gables. There are two storeys and attics, and four bays. In the ground floor are two shop fronts, the upper floor contains a shop window on the left and two sash windows on the right, and in the attic are four gabled dormers. | II |
| Admiral Rodney Hotel; 53.07853°N 0.95477°W | | Early 18th century | The public house is in brick, stuccoed at the front, on a plinth, with stuccoed quoins, a frieze with the name in relief, deep moulded eaves, a parapet, and roofs of slate and pantile. There are two storeys and attics and an L-shaped plan, with a front range of four bays, and a rear wing. In the left bay of the ground floor is a carriage entrance converted into a recessed doorway, the windows are sashes, and in the attic are two gabled dormers. | II |
| Clyde House; 53.07589°N 0.95713°W | | Early 18th century | The house is in brick, partly rendered, with stone dressings and a tile roof. The front facing the street has two storeys and three bays, a plinth and cogged eaves. The doorway has a moulded surround, a fanlight and a cornice, and most of the windows are sashes. The garden front has three storeys and modillion eaves, a central doorway with a moulded surround, a fanlight and a cornice, flanked by three-light casement windows, and to the right is a two-storey extension. | II |
| Elmfield House and walls 53.07945°N 0.95000°W | | Early 18th century | The house is in brick on a plinth, with stone dressings, a floor band, deep eaves with modillions, and a sprocketed hipped roof. There are three storeys and three bays. In the centre is a doorway with a moulded surround, a fanlight and a pediment. The windows are sash windows, tripartite in the ground floor, and with keystoned lintels in the lower two floors. On the right side is a two-storey canted bay window. The garden walls are in brick with coping, and extend for about 120 metres (390 ft). To the north is a curved section containing garage doors and a square pier. | II |
| Lloyds, Chemists; 53.07831°N 0.95485°W | | Early 18th century | Two houses, later a shop, with a stuccoed front, moulded eaves, and a slate roof. There are two storeys and five bays. In the ground floor are two late 19th-century shop fronts with corniced fascias. The upper floor contains sash windows, the middle bay blind with a wrought iron sign bracket. | II |
| Manor Farmhouse; 53.08700°N 0.94360°W | | Early 18th century | The farmhouse is rendered and colourwashed, and has a pantile roof with brick coped gables. There are two storeys, three bays, and a lean-to extension on the left. On the front is a porch and a horizontally-sliding sash window, and the other windows are casements. | II |
| Wesley Manse; 53.07442°N 0.95743°W | | Early 18th century | A farmhouse that has been extended, and later a private house, it is in brick, on a rendered plinth, with stone dressings and roofs of tile and pantile. There are two storeys and an L-shaped plan, and the original range has two gabled bays. It contains a doorway with a hood on brackets and casement windows. To the left is a recessed extension, and to the right is an extension forming a gabled wing containing a sash window and garage doors, both with segmental heads, and to the right is a lean-to addition. The garden front has a floor band and rebated eaves, and contains a central doorway with a moulded surround and a pediment on scroll brackets, and a canted bay window. | II |
| Wheatsheaf Inn; 53.07918°N 0.95315°W | | Early 18th century | The public house is in brick, roughcast and colourwashed on the front, on a plinth at the front, with a floor band, an eaves band, moulded eaves, and a tile roof with coped gables and kneelers. There are two storeys and an L-shaped plan, with a front range of four bays and a rear wing. On the front is a recessed doorway and casement windows, and in the rear wing are sash windows. | II |
| 3–7 Church Street; 53.07801°N 0.95500°W | | Mid 18th century | Three houses, later a shop and storerooms, in brick with a dentilled cornice, coved eaves and slate roofs. There are three storeys, a block of six bays to the left, and a lower block of three bays to the right. In the ground floor are shop fronts, and the upper floors contain sash windows, those in the middle floor with splayed rendered lintels. | II |
| 47 and 47A Easthorpe; 53.07597°N 0.94550°W | | Mid 18th century | A house divided into two houses, in brick on a rendered plinth, with a floor band at the rear, boxed eaves, and a roof of pantile and slate. There are two storeys and three bays. In the centre is a doorway with a segmental head, above which is a 12-pane fixed light. In the outer bays in the upper floor are horizontally-sliding sash windows, and in the ground floor are casements resembling sashes, with segmental heads. | II |
| 3 King Street; 53.07839°N 0.95494°W | | Mid 18th century | A house, later a shop, it is roughcast, and has a slate roof with brick coped gables. There are three storeys and a single bay. In the ground floor is a full-width late 19th-century shop front with a central recessed doorway, a panelled stallboard and a cornice. The middle floor contains a tripartite sash window, and in the top floor are two three-light casement windows. | II |
| 12 King Street; 53.07847°N 0.95459°W | | Mid 18th century | A house, later a restaurant, in brick, the front colourwashed, on a rendered plinth, with rebated eaves and a pantile roof. There are three storeys and two bays. On the front is an off-centre doorway and a passage doorway to the right. The windows are sashes, and in the middle floor is a sign bracket. | II |
| 15 and 15A King Street; 53.07867°N 0.95458°W | | Mid 18th century | A house and a stable range, later used for other purposes, in brick, the south gable stuccoed, with floor bands, modillion eaves, and roofs of slate and pantile with coped gables. There are three storeys and three bays, two rear wings, and a two-storey stable range. In the right bay is an elliptical-arched carriage opening, the other bays contain late 19th-century shop fronts with corniced fascias on brackets, and in the upper floors are sash windows. The stable range has casement windows, and a doorway with a segmental head. | II |
| 36 and 38 King Street; 53.07886°N 0.95385°W | | Mid 18th century | Two brick houses, roughcast on the front, with cogged eaves and pantile roofs, the right part with coped gables. There are two storeys, the left bay is taller, and to the right are three bays. There is one casement window, and the other windows are sashes. | II |
| 58 King Street; 53.07902°N 0.95300°W | | Mid 18th century | A house in brick on a rendered plinth, with a floor band, an eaves band, cogged eaves, and a pantile roof with coped gables. There are two storeys and attic and an L-shaped plan, with a front range of four bays, and a two-storey lean-to extension. The windows are sashes, and all the openings have segmental heads. | II |
| 62 King Street; 53.07907°N 0.95272°W | | Mid 18th century | A house, later an office, in brick, roughcast on the front, with a floor band, and a roof of slate and pantile. There are two storeys and attics, a double depth plan, and three bays. In the centre is a blocked doorway with a segmental head, and to its right is an ogee-headed shoe scraper. In the left bay is a modern doorway, and the windows are casements. | II |
| 1, 2 and 3 Market Place; 53.07821°N 0.95497°W | | Mid 18th century | Three houses, later shops, in brick with a slate roof, two storeys and seven bays. In the ground floor are three shop fronts; the left is in Tudor style, with a stallriser and a recessed doorway flanked by windows, the middle one dates from the late 19th century, and has a three-light window and a doorway to the right, and the right shop front dates from the late 20th century, and has a continuous fascia, a central doorway and flanking windows. In the upper floor are sash windows with segmental heads. | II |
| 42 Westgate; 53.07531°N 0.95903°W | | Mid 18th century | The house is in brick with a floor band, cogged eaves, and a tile roof with a single coped gable. There are two storeys and two bays. In the right bay is a doorway with a plain surround, and the windows are sashes with margin lights and rubbed brick heads. | II |
| 75 Westgate; 53.07488°N 0.96118°W | | Mid 18th century | A house, later a school, with the rear facing the road. It is in rendered brick, on a plinth, with a floor band on the front, and a tile roof. There are two storeys and three bays. The windows are casements with segmental heads. | II |
| 58 Westhorpe; 53.07587°N 0.97212°W | | Mid 18th century | A farmhouse, later a private house, in brick, on a plinth, with a floor band, cogged eaves, and a pantile roof with coped gables. There are two storeys, three bays, and a later single-storey wing on the right. On the front is a porch with a hood, and the windows are casements. The ground floor openings have segmental heads. | II |
| Brackenhurst Farmhouse; 53.06054°N 0.95586°W | | Mid 18th century | The farmhouse is in brick on a plinth, with floor bands, cogged and dentilled eaves, and a pantile roof with coped gables. There are two storeys, a double depth plan and three bays. In the centre is a doorway with a fanlight, and the windows on the front are sashes, those in the ground floor with segmental heads. At the rear are casement windows, and to the right is a single-storey wash house. | II |
| Home Farm Cottage; 53.07568°N 0.97360°W | | Mid 18th century | The cottage is in brick incorporating re-used timber framing, on a plinth, with dentilled eaves and a pantile roof. There are two storeys and three bays, with the gable end facing the street. On the front is a latticed porch, and the windows are casements, some with segmental heads. | II |
| Ha-ha, Norwood Park; 53.08422°N 0.97240°W | | Mid 18th century | The ha-ha consists of a brick wall with irregular stone coping, and it contains wrought iron gates. It has an irregular curving plan, and extends for about 300 metres (980 ft). | II |
| Ice house, Norwood Park; 53.08360°N 0.96729°W | | Mid 18th century | The ice house is in brick, and has a segmental-headed entrance flanked by plain buttresses with flat concrete caps. It has an egg-shaped chamber, and is covered by a mound of earth. | II |
| Railings and gateway, East Drive, Norwood Park; 53.07940°N 0.96605°W | | Mid 18th century | Flanking the entrance to the drive are square gate piers with plinths, and moulded caps with ball finials, and between them is a wooden gate. Outside the piers are incurving dwarf walls with spiked iron railing, ending in square piers with plinths and pyramidal caps. | II |
| Kitchen garden walls, Norwood Park; 53.08672°N 0.97396°W | | Mid 18th century | The walls that enclosed the former kitchen garden are in brick with flat stone coping, and form an irregular five-sided plan. In the centre of the southeast side is a gateway with square piers and ball finials, and to the left is a doorway with a segmental head. The northwest wall has ramped coping, and contains two chimney stacks, casement windows, and doorways, one with a segmental head. | II |
| Former stable range, Norwood Park; 53.08517°N 0.97479°W | | Mid 18th century | The stable range, later used for other purposes, is in brick with stone dressings, rebated and chamfered eaves, and roofs of slate and pantile. It is in one and two storeys, with a U-shaped plan around a stable yard, and a main front of nine bays. Most of the windows are sashes. The middle bay of the southwest block projects slightly and contains a round-headed doorway with a moulded surround, above it is a moulded pediment containing a clock, and on the roof is an octagonal bell turret. To the left is a water tower, and to the right is a two-storey block with seven round-headed recesses on the southeast side. At the northeast end is a single-storey carriage house with a hipped roof, and to the northwest is a single-storey four-bay range with stable doors and casement windows. | II |
| Former Shoulder of Mutton public house 53.07536°N 0.95897°W | | Mid 18th century | The public house, later a private house, is in brick with a floor band, cogged eaves and a roof of tile and pantile. There are three storeys and three bays, a projecting lean-to extension at the front, and a full-width two-storey lean-to extension at the rear. In the centre is a doorway with a segmental head, and the windows are sashes, those in the lower two floors with segmental heads. | II |
| The Cottage and wall 53.07934°N 0.95865°W | | Mid 18th century | The cottage is in stone, with an extension in rendered brick, and a pantile roof. There are two storeys and three bays. In the centre is a doorway with a moulded surround and a pediment, it is flanked by horizontally-sliding sash windows, and in the upper floor the windows are casements. All the windows have segmental heads. The boundary wall is in brick with ramped gabled coping, and it extends for about 50 metres (160 ft). | II |
| The Old Rectory; 53.07619°N 0.95085°W | | Mid 18th century | The rectory, later a private house, is in brick, mainly roughcast, on a plinth, with stone dressings, and a tile roof with coped gables and kneelers. There are two storeys and attics, a front range of five bays, and two gabled rear wings. In the centre is a flat-roofed porch, and a doorway with a fanlight. Most of the windows are sashes, those on the front with keystones. At the rear is a French window with a balcony, a conservatory, and sash windows with segmental heads. | II |
| Trinity House; 53.07491°N 0.96010°W | | Mid 18th century | The house, with its back to the street, is in colourwashed roughcast brick, with dentilled eaves, and a pantile roof with coped gables. There are two storeys and attics and an L-shaped plan, with a front of two bays. In the centre is a gabled lattice porch, the windows are sashes, and in the attics are two flat-roofed dormers with casements. At the rear is a gabled wing and a lean-to outbuilding, linked by a wall with a round-headed doorway. | II |
| West Lodge, wall and gate piers 53.07693°N 0.95607°W | | Mid 18th century | The house is in brick, colourwashed on the front, on a plinth, with stone dressings, a floor band, an eaves band, dentilled eaves, and a tile roof. There are two storeys and attics, and three bays. The central doorway has a moulded surround, a fanlight with Gothic glazing, and a cornice. The windows are sashes with segmental heads, those in the ground floor tripartite, and in the attic are gabled dormers. In front of the house is a low brick wall with ramped gabled coping containing square piers. In the centre is a pair of obelisk-shaped wrought iron skeleton gate piers and a plain spiked gate. | II |
| Westby House and wall 53.07523°N 0.95955°W | | Mid 18th century | The house is at right angles to the street, and was later extended. It is in rendered and colourwashed brick, with stone dressings and roofs in tile and slate. The east front has two storeys and five bays, the middle bay projecting slightly under a pediment. In the centre is a doorway with a moulded surround and a cornice on scroll brackets, flanked by canted bay windows, and the upper floor contains sash windows. The west front has two storeys and attics, and a mix of casement windows and sashes, some with segmental heads. The boundary wall is in brick and coped, it extends for about 60 metres (200 ft), and contains two round-headed doors. | II |
| Norwood Park and West Wing; 53.08501°N 0.97549°W | | c. 1763 | A country house in brick on a plinth, with stone dressings, a floor band, modillion eaves and a modillion pediment, low parapets and a hipped slate roof. The main block has three storeys, it is flanked by two-storey three-bay wings and two-storey pavilions. The main front has five bays, with a pediment over the middle three bays. In the centre is a full-height round-arched recess containing a doorway with a moulded surround, a fanlight, and a pediment on scroll brackets, flanked by side lights, above which is a Venetian window. The other windows are sashes with lintels and keystones. In the left wing is a French window and a round-headed window, the right wing has a conservatory, and the pavilions contain Venetian windows. In the centre of the entrance front is a two-storey canted porch, and a doorway with a fanlight and a pediment. | II* |
| Lodge cottage, Norwood Park; 53.07946°N 0.96621°W | | c. 1764 | The lodge is in brick on a plinth, with a floor band, corner pilasters, moulded eaves and a slate roof. There are two storeys and a T-shaped plan, with a main range of three bays. The projecting bays facing the road and the drive have pedimented gables, and each contains a canted bay window with a parapet, above which is a semicircular window containing a window with a segmental head. The windows are sashes, and in the angle at the front is a hip roofed verandah with round iron posts. | II |
| Normanton Prebend, walls and gates 53.07721°N 0.95157°W | | c. 1765 | A prebend house incorporating earlier material, later a private house, it is in brick with stone dressings, floor bands, dentilled eaves, and a slate roof. There are three storeys and an L-shaped plan, with a main range of five bays. To the left is a two-storey addition on piers with a double-arched balcony and a hipped roof. In the centre of the main range is a flat-roofed Tuscan porch and a doorway with a fanlight, and the windows are sashes with keystoned lintels. The garden walls are in brick, with stone coping on the street side, and wrought iron railings. In the centre are square panelled gate piers with cornices and urn finials, between which are spiked wrought iron gates. | II |
| North Muskham Prebend, wall and Kirkland House; 53.07755°N 0.95341°W | | c. 1769 | The prebend house was added to a 17th-century house, it was extended at the front in about 1809, it has since been used for other purposes, the rear wing known as Kirkland House. The house is in brick with stone dressings, chamfered eaves, and slate roofs with coped gables. There are two storeys, and an L-shaped plan, with a front range of five bays, the middle bay projecting under a pediment containing a semicircular window. In the centre is a gabled Gothic porch with fluted iron columns and a doorway with a moulded eared surround, a fanlight and a pediment. The windows are sashes with splayed lintels. The rear wing has two storeys and attics and a single bay, and to the left is a taller three-storey three bay range, its openings with segmental heads. The boundary wall is in brick with stone coping, and contains wrought iron skeleton posts and a spearhead gate. | II |
| 64 Church Street; 53.07610°N 0.94855°W | | c. 1770 | A house, shop and workshop in brick, colourwashed on the front, on rendered stone plinths, with cogged eaves and pantile roofs. There are three storeys and attics, a front of three bays, and a later two-storey rear extension. In the centre is a doorway with columns, a fanlight and a cornice, and to its right is an early 19th-century shop front. The windows on the front are sashes, the one to the left of the doorway with a segmental head. At the rear is a workshop with two storeys and six bays. | II |
| Calvert's Farmhouse; 53.07594°N 0.97035°W | | c. 1770 | A farmhouse, later a private house, at right angles to the street, in brick, with cogged eaves and a pantile roof. There are two storeys and five bays. The windows are a mix of casements and horizontally-sliding sashes, those in the ground floor with segmental heads, and some with Gothic glazing bars. | II |
| Sacrista Prebend; 53.07765°N 0.95621°W | | 1774 | A prebend house incorporating earlier material, later used for other purposes, in brick, stuccoed on the front, on a plinth, with stone dressings, chamfered eaves at the rear, and a slate roof with coped gables. There are two storeys and three bays, the outer bays gabled, and a rear wing. In the centre is a canted flat-roofed porch with a Tudor arched doorway and a pierced balustrade, flanked by canted bay windows with hipped roofs, containing five transomed lancet windows. The upper floor contains transomed lancet windows with hood moulds, and in the rear wing are sash windows. | II |
| 11 and 13 Nottingham Road; 53.07516°N 0.95812°W | | c. 1775 | A house, later divided, in brick on a rendered plinth, with a floor band, cogged eaves, and a pantile roof with the remains of coped gables. There are two storeys and three bays. In the centre is a pair of doorways, and the windows are sashes, those in the ground floor with rendered lintels. | II |
| 1 Church Street; 53.07808°N 0.95513°W | | Late 18th century | A house, later offices on a corner site, in brick on a plinth, with stone dressings, moulded dentilled eaves, and a hipped slate roof. There are three storeys, a square plan, and fronts of three bays. On Market Place is a central doorway with a fanlight and a cornice on consoles, and on Church Street is a shop front with pilasters. The windows are sashes with keystoned lintels. | II |
| 41 Church Street; 53.07644°N 0.94981°W | | Late 18th century | Two cottages combined into one house, it is in brick with rebated eaves, pantile roofs, and three bays. The left bay has a single storey and an attic, the right two bays have two storeys, the middle bay higher. On the front is a gable porch, the windows are a mix of sashes and casements, and in the left bay is a flat-roofed dormer. The ground floor openings have segmental heads. | II |
| 45 Church Street; 53.07630°N 0.94944°W | | Late 18th century | A brick house with stucco dressings, dentilled eaves and a pantile roof. There are two storeys and an attic, and three bays. In the centre is a doorway with a fanlight, the windows are sashes, and all the openings have splayed lintels. | II |
| 49 Church Street; 53.07628°N 0.94922°W | | Late 18th century | A house at right angles to the street, in brick on a stepped rendered plinth, with stone dressings, cogged eaves and a hipped tile roof. There are three storeys, three bays, and a short rear wing. The central doorway has a moulded surround, a dentilled cornice, and a fanlight. The windows on the front are sashes, there are some dummy windows, and the windows in the lower two floors have splayed lintels. On the front facing the street, the windows in the lower two floors are three-light casements with splayed lintels, in the top floor is a semicircular window, and all the windows on this front have keystones. | II |
| 65 Church Street; 53.07628°N 0.94888°W | | Late 18th century | A house and shop at right angles to the street, in brick on a rendered plinth, with cogged eaves and a hipped tile roof. There are three storeys and a basement, and three bays. Steps lead up to the central doorway that has a moulded surround and a dentilled cornice on scroll brackets. The windows are casements with splayed lintels. In the front facing the street is an early 19th-century shop front with a fluted surround, above which is a tripartite sash window with a keystone, and a dummy Diocletian window. | II |
| 24 Easthorpe; 53.07590°N 0.94612°W | | Late 18th century | The house is in brick, with a rendered plinth on the right side, cogged eaves and a pantile roof. There are two storeys and an L-shaped plan, with a front range of two bays. In the right bay is a porch and a blank window above, and the left bay has a sash window in both floors. | II |
| 31 Easthorpe; 53.07623°N 0.94635°W | | Late 18th century | A pair of cottages combined into a house, it is in brick with stone dressings and pantile roofs. There are two storeys and an L-shaped plan, with a front range of three bays, and a lean-to cart shed at right angles on the left. On the front is a gabled porch, and the windows are sashes, those in the ground floor with segmental heads. | II |
| 67 Easthorpe; 53.07591°N 0.94505°W | | Late 18th century | The house is in brick on a rendered plinth, with cogged eaves, and a pantile roof with coped gables. There are two storeys and two bays. To the right of the central doorway is an ogee-headed shoe scraper. The windows are two-light horizontally-sliding sashes, those in the ground floor with segmental heads. | II |
| 1 King Street; 53.07836°N 0.95504°W | | Late 18th century | A house on a corner site, later a shop, it is stuccoed, on a stone plinth, and has a slate roof. There are three storeys and attics, and two bays on each front. In the ground floor on each side is a late 19th-century shop front with pilasters and a corniced fascia, and on Queen Street is a shop window with a cornice. The upper floors contain sash windows, some horizontally-sliding. | II |
| 5 King Street; 53.07843°N 0.95489°W | | Late 18th century | A house incorporating a 17th-century timber-framed rear wing, later a shop. The rear wing has colourwashed brick cladding, a single storey, and a pantile roof. The front is in colourwashed brick, the ground floor is rendered, and there is a floor band, dentilled eaves and a slate roof. In the ground floor is a shop front, and above are sash windows, those in the middle floor with segmental heads. | II |
| 7 King Street; 53.07846°N 0.95483°W | | Late 18th century | A house later used for other purposes, in brick, stuccoed on the front, and with a pantile roof. There are two storeys and two bays. To the left is a round-arched entry, to the right is a shop front, and the upper floor contains sash windows. At the rear is a two-storey colourwashed range with cogged eaves, and to the left is a taller two-storey range with dentilled eaves. | II |
| 25, 25A and 27A–C King Street; 53.07896°N 0.95396°W | | Late 18th century | Two shops with flats, in brick, with cogged eaves, pantile roofs, three storeys and three bays. In the ground floor is a round-headed entry flanked by shop fronts, that on the left larger, under a continuous fascia. The left shop front has a central doorway with a round-headed fanlight flanked by windows with three round-headed lights, and the right shop front has an angled doorway and a similar three-light window. The upper floors contain sash windows, those in the middle floor with segmental heads. At the rear are two parallel two-storey ranges flanking a courtyard, and two cottages. | II |
| 56 King Street; 53.07892°N 0.95313°W | | Late 18th century | The house is in brick, with a floor band, dentilled eaves and a pantile roof. There are two storeys and three bays, and a two-storey extension to the right. The central doorway has a fanlight, the windows are sashes, and all the openings have segmental rubbed brick heads. | II |
| 58A and 60 King Street and gate 53.07898°N 0.95283°W | | Late 18th century | A house, a shop and a workshop in brick. The shop has a single storey, the gable end facing the street, with a rendered plinth and containing a shop window. There are cogged eaves and a tile roof, a doorway and a casement window. The house has two storeys, the remains of a floor band, rebated eaves and a pantile roof. On the front is a two-storey hipped porch on piers, and the windows are sashes. Beyond, is the former workshop with two storeys, a doorway and casement windows with segmental heads. Attached to the street end of the building is a wrought iron spearhead gate. | II |
| 81 and 83 King Street; 53.07952°N 0.95240°W | | Late 18th century | A pair of mirror image houses in brick with a pantile roof. There are two storeys and two bays. The doorways are in the centre, the windows are casements, and all the openings have segmental heads. | II |
| 1 Kirklington Road and wall 53.07938°N 0.95849°W | | Late 18th century | The house is in brick with cogged eaves and a pantile roof. There are two storeys and attics and an L-shaped plan, with a front range of three bays. The central doorway has plain jambs and a fanlight, the windows are casements, and all the openings on the front have segmental heads. The attached boundary wall is in brick with gabled and half-round copings. | II |
| 9 Nottingham Road; 53.07522°N 0.95807°W | | Late 18th century | A brick house with rendered lintels, moulded brick dentilled eaves and a pantile roof. There are two storeys and two bays. On the front is a doorway, and the windows are sashes. | II |
| 15 Nottingham Road; 53.07508°N 0.95797°W | | Late 18th century | The house is in brick with stone dressings, dentilled eaves and a pantile roof. There are two storeys and three bays. In the centre is a doorway with a fanlight, and the windows are sashes with margin lights. The ground floor openings have rubbed brick heads. | II |
| 4 Sheppard's Row; 53.07891°N 0.95560°W | | Late 18th century | Three cottages combined into one, in brick, with a rendered plinth at the rear, cogged and rebated eaves and pantile roofs. There are two storeys and five irregular bays. On the front are two porches, one gabled, the other a lean-to. The windows are a mix of casements and horizontally-sliding sashes, some with segmental heads. | II |
| 2 Westgate and railing 53.07776°N 0.95579°W | | Late 18th century | A house, later offices, in brick, with stone dressings, coved eaves and a hipped slate roof. There are three storeys, a front range of three bays, and a two-storey rear wing. In the centre is a Classical doorway with pilasters, a fanlight with decorative tracery, and a cornice, and above it are blank windows. The other windows on the front are sashes, and all the windows have multi-keystoned lintels. In the rear wing is a segmental-headed doorway with a fanlight. Along the front of the building is a wrought iron spearhead area railing on a stone plinth. | II |
| 4 Westgate; 53.07617°N 0.95731°W | | Late 18th century | A house, later used for other purposes, in brick on a rendered plinth with a tile roof. There are three storeys, with the gable end facing the street. The centre of the gable end projects slightly under a pediment, and is flanked by half-pediments. In the ground floor is a mid 19th-century shop front with a cornice, and the upper floors contain sash windows with segmental heads. To the left is a recessed extension containing a doorway with a fanlight. | II |
| 18 Westgate; 53.07604°N 0.95750°W | | Late 18th century | A house in brick with cogged eaves and a tile roof. There are two storeys and three bays. In the centre is a doorway, the windows are horizontally-sliding sashes, and all the openings, except for the window to the right of the door, have segmental heads. | II |
| 27 and 29 Westgate; 53.07579°N 0.95756°W | | Late 18th century | A pair of brick houses with cogged eaves, roofs of slate and pantile, and two storeys. In the centre are two doorways with segmental heads, the left one taller, each with an ogee-headed boot scraper to the left. To the left of the doorways is a shop bow window, and to the right is a two-light shop window with a cornice. The upper floor contains three horizontally-sliding sash windows with segmental heads. | II |
| 55 Westgate; 53.07499°N 0.95990°W | | Late 18th century | The house is in colourwashed rendered brick with stone dressings and a slate roof. There are two storeys and three bays. The central doorway has an open pediment on scroll brackets. Above it is a blank window, and the other windows are sashes. | II |
| 69 and 71 Westgate; 53.07487°N 0.96077°W | | Late 18th century | Two brick houses with stone dressings, cogged eaves and pantile roofs. No. 69 has three storeys and three bays, and No. 71 has two storeys and two bays. Each house has a doorway with a fanlight, and the windows in both houses are sashes. | II |
| 81 and 81A Westgate; 53.07496°N 0.96187°W | | Late 18th century | A house extended to the rear in 1824 and later divided. It is in brick, the street front roughcast and colourwashed, with stone dressings and pantile roofs. There are two storeys, a double range plan, and three bays. The windows are sash windows, those on the garden front with splayed lintels and keystones. The middle bay of the garden front projects under a pediment, and contains a flat-roofed Doric porch with curved steps, and a doorway with a moulded surround and a fanlight. | II |
| 27 and 29 Westhorpe; 53.07580°N 0.96942°W | | Late 18th century | A row of three, later two, cottages in brick, with pantile roofs, two storeys and three bays. On the front are three doorways, one with a keystone, and the windows are a mix, consisting of fixed lights, a casement window and horizontally-sliding sashes. The openings in the ground floor have segmental heads. | II |
| 31 Westhorpe; 53.07579°N 0.96955°W | | Late 18th century | Two cottages, later combined, in brick, with a pantile roof, two storeys and three bays. In the centre is a blocked doorway with a moulded surround containing a horizontally-sliding sash window, to the right is a similar window and a doorway with a segmental head and a keystone, and to the left is a carriage entry. The upper floor contains casement windows, and all the windows have segmental heads. | II |
| 35 Westhorpe; 53.07574°N 0.96979°W | | Late 18th century | A brick house with stone dressings, cogged eaves and a pantile roof. There are two storeys and attics, and two bays. The main doorway has a reeded surround and a panelled hood on curved brackets, and there is another doorway to the right. The windows are a mix of sashes, some tripartite, and casements, and there is a round-headed stair window at the rear. On the gable end facing the road is an entry doorway with a fanlight and a cornice. | II |
| 36 and 38 Westhorpe; 53.07588°N 0.97043°W | | Late 18th century | A pair of cottages with a former workshop added on the left, in brick with cogged eaves and a pantile roof. The cottages have two storeys and two bays, and the workshop is taller with two storeys and an attic, and a single bay. The windows in both parts are casements. | II |
| 46, 48 and 50 Westhorpe; 53.07587°N 0.97123°W | | Late 18th century | A row of three cottages in brick with cogged eaves and a pantile roof. There are two storeys and four bays. Most of the windows are horizontally-sliding sashes, there is a casement window, and the ground floor openings have segmental heads. | II |
| Barn and stable opposite 78 Westhorpe; 53.07518°N 0.97497°W | | Late 18th century | The barn and adjoining stable are in brick with pantile roofs. The barn, on the right, has dentilled eaves, coped gables and four bays. It contains a pair of barn doors and four blocked vents. The stable is lower and contains doors, vents and a hatch. | II |
| 82 and 84 Westhorpe; 53.07504°N 0.97627°W | | Late 18th century | A pair of cottages in brick with cogged eaves and pantile roofs. There are two storeys, one cottage has four bays and the other has three. The windows are a mix of casements and horizontally-sliding sashes. | II |
| Apiary House and wall 53.07625°N 0.94838°W | | Late 18th century | A brick house with a roof of tile and pantile, two storeys and three bays. The central doorway has a plain surround, a fanlight and an open pediment on brackets. The windows are sashes with rubbed brick heads. At the front is a dwarf wall with railings and a wrought iron gate, and the side walls are in brick with gabled stone coping. | II |
| Archway Cottages; 53.07541°N 0.95923°W | | Late 18th century | A row of four cottages in brick, with cogged eaves, pantile roofs and two storeys. The windows are a mix of casements, and sashes, some of the latter horizontally sliding. In the ground floor, some of the openings have segmental heads, and there is a round-headed passage doorway. | II |
| Bath Cottage; 53.07234°N 0.97835°W | | Late 18th century | The house is in brick with roofs of tile and pantile. There are two storeys and an L-shaped plan, a front range of three bays, and a single-storey outbuilding to the right. On the front is a gabled porch and a doorway with a segmental head. Most of the windows are horizontally-sliding sashes, those in the ground floor with segmental heads, and in the right gable is a casement window. | II |
| Barns, Bath Cottage; 53.07248°N 0.97809°W | | Late 18th century | The barns are in brick with pantile roofs and a single storey. The larger barn to the left has cogged eaves, and it contains a segmental headed doorway and a casement window. The smaller barn has a coped gable and two re-used corbels. | II |
| Blenheim House; 53.07587°N 0.94573°W | | Late 18th century | The house is in brick, the left gable rendered, on a rendered plinth, with dentilled eaves at the front, cogged eaves at the rear, and a pantile roof. There are two storeys and attics, a front range of three bays, and a single-storey rear extension. In the centre is a doorway with a fanlight, and a shoe scraper to the right, the windows on the front are horizontally-sliding sashes, and all the openings on the front have segmental heads. There are casement windows in the right gable and at the rear. | II |
| Brinkley Hall Farmhouse; 53.06874°N 0.93677°W | | Late 18th century | The farmhouse is in colourwashed brick, with a floor band, cogged eaves, and a pantile roof with coped gables. There are three storeys, a main range of three bays, and a later two-storey rendered rear wing. The central doorway has a fanlight, there is one horizontally-sliding sash window, and the other windows are casements. The openings in the lower two floors have segmental heads. | II |
| Burgage Court; 53.07872°N 0.95068°W | | Late 18th century | The house is in brick on a plinth, with stone dressings, a floor band, rebated eaves, and hipped slate roofs. There are two storeys and an L-shaped plan, with fronts of five and three bays, and a two-storey rear wing. The middle three bays of the east front are canted, and contain a central doorway with a fanlight and sash windows. The outer bays contain Venetian windows in the lower two floors, and Diocletian windows in the top floor. On the south front are two canted bay windows with dentilled cornices. The rear wing contains a semicircular projection and a hipped porch. | II |
| Burgage House and walls 53.07933°N 0.95191°W | | Late 18th century | A house, later extended and used for other purposes, in brick on a plinth, with stone dressings, rebated eaves and a hipped slate roof. There are three storeys and an L-shaped plan, with a front range of three bays, and a rear link to the former coach house. Steps lead up to the central doorway that has an open pediment and a door with a fanlight, and the windows are sashes, those in the outer bays tripartite. On the right side is a shallow two-storey bay window. To the right is a brick boundary wall with stone slab coping, containing a blocked round-headed doorway. The rear boundary wall has stepped brick coping, and contains a round-headed doorway. | II |
| Cottage Beams and The Annexe; 53.07603°N 0.94751°W | | Late 18th century | A house and three cottages combined into one house, in brick with cogged eaves, and pantile roofs with coped gables. The original house has two storeys and attics, and a front of two bays, and the other parts have two storeys. The doorway has a segmental head, and most of the windows are casements, some tripartite, and some with segmental heads. | II |
| Easthorpe Lodge and Easthorpe Court; 53.07493°N 0.94649°W | | Late 18th century | A house, later divided into two, in brick, partly rendered and colourwashed, with stone dressings, hipped slate roofs, and two storeys. The main block has a plinth, and sash windows, those at the front and the rear with keystones. The west front has three bays, a central Doric portico and a door with a fanlight. The garden front has a two-storey circular bay window, and a conservatory. There is a wing with a round-headed stair window, and a canted bay window. On the north side is a single-storey balustraded billiard roof. | II |
| Hall Farmhouse; 53.07505°N 0.97602°W | | Late 18th century | The farmhouse, later a private house, is in brick, with a floor band, cogged eaves, and a pantile roof with coped gables. There are two storeys and an attic, and an L-shaped plan, with a front range of three bays, and a rear wing. In the centre is a doorway, the windows are casements, and all the openings on the front have segmental heads. | II |
| Hilliers; 53.07672°N 0.95643°W | | Late 18th century | A house, at one time a shop, on a corner site, in brick, with cogged eaves and a tile roof. There are two storeys, two bays on the front, three on the left return, and a single-storey extension at the rear. The doorway in the right bay has a segmental head and a fanlight. The windows are sashes, the window in the ground floor with a segmental head, and on the left return are blank windows, those in the ground floor with segmental heads. | II |
| Home Farmhouse; 53.07574°N 0.97349°W | | Late 18th century | A farmhouse, later a private house, in brick, with dentilled eaves and a pantile roof. There are three storeys and two bays, and a single-storey wing at the rear. The doorway is on the left, and the windows are three-light casements, those in the ground floor with segmental heads. | II |
| Honing House; 53.07525°N 0.96271°W | | Late 18th century | The house is in brick with roofs of slate and pantile. There are three storeys and an L-shaped plan, with a front range of three bays, and two rear wings. In the centre is a flat-roofed porch with dentilled eaves, the windows in the two lower floors are sashes with segmental heads, and in the top floor are horizontally-sliding sashes, the middle one a dummy. | II |
| Kelham House; 53.07637°N 0.95674°W | | Late 18th century | A brick house with stone dressings, the eaves with half-round dentils, and a hipped slate roof. There are three storeys and three bays. The central doorway has a moulded surround and a dentilled cornice. The windows are sashes with rubbed brick heads, those in the outer bays are tripartite. To the right is a wash house with a pantile roof. | II |
| Barn and pigeoncote, Manor Farm; 53.08698°N 0.94398°W | | Late 18th century | The barn and pigeoncote are in brick with pantile roofs. The pigeoncote has two storeys and ribbed coped gables. It contains a round-headed doorway, a loading door, casement windows and pigeonholes. The barn dates from the early 19th century and has a hipped roof. It contains barn doors with a canopy, other doors, a hatch and vents. | II |
| Cowsheds and stables, Manor Farm; 53.08684°N 0.94365°W | — | Late 18th century | The farm buildings are in brick with pantile roofs, and have a single storey. The cowshed to the left has a coped gable and two half-doors, the cowshed in the middle has a half-door and a blocked doorway, and the stable to the right has a half-door and a slatted opening. | II |
| Milestone; 53.07805°N 0.95532°W | | Late 18th century | The milestone adjacent to the Saracen's Head Inn is in stone, and consists of a plain rectangular slab. The inscriptions, with are partly illegible, show the distances to London and Mansfield. | II |
| Cottages opposite former North Mill, Maythorne; 53.09327°N 0.96047°W | — | Late 18th century | The cottages are in brick with dentilled eaves and a hipped pantile roof. There are three storeys and three bays, and at the rear are two and three-storey extensions. The doorways have segmental heads, and the windows are casements, those on the front with segmental heads. | II |
| Former Manager's house, cottages and workshops, Maythorne; 53.09331°N 0.96134°W | — | Late 18th century | The buildings are in brick with stone dressings and roofs of slate and pantile. There are two storeys and a U-shaped plan, with fronts of six and three bays. The house has a round-headed doorway with a rusticated surround, a fanlight, and a keystone. The windows are casements, and sashes with rusticated keystoned lintels, and there is a square bay window. The workshop range contains sash and casement windows, and a semicircular window. | II |
| Former North Mill, Maythorne; 53.09349°N 0.96039°W | | Late 18th century | A spinning mill converted into flats, it is in brick and has a pantile roof with a single shouldered coped gable. There are three storeys and attics and seven bays, and to the right is a four-storey single-bay wing. The doorway has a flat hood, the windows are tilting casements with segmental heads, in the gable of the right wing is a round window, and in the attic are five flat-roofed dormers. | II |
| Former South Mill, Maythorne; 53.09335°N 0.96060°W | | Late 18th century | A spinning mill converted into flats, it is in brick and has a pantile roof. There are four storeys and attics and seven bays. On the front are three doors, two with fanlights, and the windows are two-light casements; all the openings have segmental heads. In the attic are five flat-roofed dormers. | II |
| Garden Temple, Norwood Park; 53.08202°N 0.97758°W | | Late 18th century | The building is in brick with a wooden front and a corrugated iron roof, and is in Classical style. It has a tetrastyle Doric front, with a metope and triglyph frieze and a dentilled pediment. The interior is rendered, and has a moulded cornice. | II |
| Park House; 53.07343°N 0.95732°W | | Late 18th century | A brick house on a plinth, with stone dressings, moulded stone eaves at the front and wooden modillions elsewhere, and a hipped slate roof. There are three storeys, four bays on the front and three on the sides. On the front is a stone Doric doorcase with an open pediment and a door with a fanlight, and in the right return is a round-headed doorway with a fanlight. The windows are sashes with splayed lintels, and those on the front also have multiple keystones. | II |
| Pathway House; 53.07609°N 0.95740°W | | Late 18th century | The house is in colourwashed brick on plinths, with stone dressings, cogged eaves, and a pantile roof with coped gables and kneelers. There are two storeys, three bays, the middle bay projecting slightly under a pediment, and two gabled rear wings. The windows are sashes, the openings in the middle bay are blank, and in the right return is a doorway with a segmental head and a fanlight. | II |
| Regency House; 53.07556°N 0.95780°W | | Late 18th century | A brick house on a plinth, with stone dressings, chamfered eaves and a hipped slate roof. There are three storeys and three bays, and a slightly recessed two-storey extension on the right. The middle bay contains a full-height round-headed recess, the windows are sashes with rubbed brick heads, and in the extension is a doorway above which are traceried panels and a cornice. | II |
| Boundary wall and gatepiers, Sacrista Prebend; 53.07756°N 0.95577°W | | Late 18th century | The boundary wall is in brick with stone coping, and extends for about 35 metres (115 ft). It contains a pair of square stone gate piers with moulded caps. | II |
| St Margaret's, wall and railing 53.07850°N 0.95572°W | | Late 18th century | A brick house, the left gable rendered, with stone dressings, dentilled eaves and a pantile roof. There are three storeys, three bays, and a full-width two-storey lean-to at the rear. The central doorway has pilasters, a fanlight and a hood on brackets. Above it is a blank window, the other windows are sashes, and all have splayed lintels. To the right is an entry door with a fanlight, and in front of the house is a dwarf brick wall with a cast iron railing and gate. | II |
| Staffords' Farm; 53.07592°N 0.97184°W | | Late 18th century | The farmhouse is in brick with moulded modillion eaves and a pantile roof. There are two storeys and three bays, and a large rear extension. In the centre is a doorway with a fanlight, and the windows are sashes with rubbed brick heads. | II |
| Cottage, stable and carriage house east of South Muskham Prebend; 53.07665°N 0.95084°W | | Late 18th century | The buildings are in brick with roofs of tile and pantile. The cottage is whitewashed, with cogged eaves, two storeys and two bays. The windows are sashes, and the openings have segmental heads. To the left is a two-storey stable range with a coped gable, a casement window, and external stairs leading to a doorway. The carriage house has a passageway and three pairs of carriage doors. | II |
| The Burgage Cottage and The Cottage; 53.07948°N 0.95141°W | | Late 18th century | Three houses, later two, in brick, with cogged eaves and pantile roofs. There are two doorways, the left with a segmental head, and the right with a fanlight. Most of the windows are horizontally-sliding sashes, those in the ground floor with segmental heads. | II |
| Westhorpe Hall; 53.07558°N 0.97536°W | — | Late 18th century | A country house divided into flats, it is stuccoed, on a plinth, with stone dressings, moulded and rebated eaves, hipped slate roofs, and an irregular plan. The eastern front has a projection containing a Classical porch with square piers, a moulded cornice, and a doorway with a fanlight. The windows are a mix of sashes and casements, some with mullions. The north front is in Gothic style, with seven bays, a plinth and an embattled parapet, and it contains two two-storey canted bay windows. To the right of the west side is a single-storey billiard room, and on the south front is a Classical porch. | II |
| Barn, Brinkley Hall Farm; 53.06859°N 0.93693°W | | c. 1780 | The barn is in brick and has a pantile roof with coped gables. There are four bays, and the openings include doorways with segmental heads, slit vents and vents in patterns, and a hatch. | II |
| Westhorpe House; 53.07592°N 0.97169°W | | c. 1780 | A farmhouse, later a private house, in brick, on a plinth, with stone dressings, dentilled eaves, and a pantile roof with coped gables and kneelers. There are three storeys and three bays. The central doorway has a fanlight and a pediment on scroll brackets, and the windows are sashes with rubbed brick heads. | II |
| 9 Church Street; 53.07794°N 0.95449°W | | 1784 | The extension to a prebendal house, extended in about 1920 as a bank, and later a private house, it is in colourwashed brick, with stone dressings and a slate roof. The house has chamfered quoins, moulded eaves, two storeys and five bays. To the left is a two-storey bay window, and the windows are sashes. The bank extension at the front has rusticated quoins, a moulded parapet, a single storey and five bays. In the left bay is a projecting porch, the right bay is blank, and the other bays contain sash windows. | II |
| Minster Lodge; 53.07790°N 0.95422°W | | 1784 | A prebendal house, later a private house, it incorporates earlier material in the rear wing. It is in brick with cogged eaves, and roofs of pantile and slate with a single coped gable. There are two storeys, a main range of five bays, a rear addition with three bays, and a rear wing with three bays, the last incorporating a portion of a 14th-century wall. Most of the windows are sashes, and there is a 14th-century double lancet in the rear wing. | II |
| Westgate House; 53.07589°N 0.95737°W | | c. 1790 | Two houses combined into one, the later house added in about 1830. It is in brick on a rendered plinth, with stone dressings, cogged eaves and slate roofs. There are two storeys and two blocks of two bays. The left block is higher and contains sash windows with keystoned lintels. To the left of the right block is a doorway with a reeded surround, a fanlight, a small hood on brackets, and a shoe scraper on the left. The windows are sashes, the window in the ground floor with a splayed lintel. | II |
| Willoughby House; 53.07765°N 0.95368°W | | c. 1795 | A house later used for other purposes, in brick, with cogged eaves, and a slate roof with coped gables and kneelers. There are three storeys and an L-shaped plan, with a front range of five bays. The lower two storeys at the front project, with moulded terracotta cornices and a parapet. The central bay is recessed and contains a recessed doorway with a moulded surround, a fanlight, and a cornice on consoles. The windows are sashes, the window above the doorway with a round head, and those in the ground floor with segmental heads. | II |
| Sunville and walls 53.07777°N 0.95404°W | | c. 1796 | The house, which was extended in the 19th century, is in brick, with stone dressings and a hipped slate roof. There are three storeys, a front range of three bays, and a two-storey rear wing. In the centre is a flat-roofed latticed porch and a doorway with a fanlight. The windows on the front are sashes with splayed lintels, and on the right return they have segmental heads. The garden walls are in brick with half-round coping, and contain square piers with stone caps. | II |
| Hill House; 53.07835°N 0.94966°W | | 1800 | A large house, later used for other purposes, in brick, on a plinth, with floor and sill bands, dentilled eaves and hipped slate roofs. There are three storeys and an irregular plan. On the northern entrance front are six bays, the third bay projecting and containing a flat porch with Tuscan columns and an entablature, and a doorway with a fanlight. The left two bays contain blank windows and in the other bays are sash windows, all these openings with multi-keystoned heads. The east front has five bays, the middle three projecting under a pediment. In the left two bays is a canted bay window with a parapet. To the right of the south side is a single-storey extension, and to its right is a loggia with two columns. | II |
| 23A Easthorpe; 53.07624°N 0.94706°W | | c. 1800 | The house is in brick on a plinth with stone dressings, rebated eaves, and a hipped tile roof. There are three storeys and three bays. The central doorway has a fanlight, a splayed lintel and a keystone. The windows in the lower two floors are sashes with splayed lintels and keystones, and in the top floor they are casements. | II |
| 27 and 29 Easthorpe; 53.07620°N 0.94667°W | | c. 1800 | A pair of brick houses with cogged eaves and a hipped slate roof. There are three storeys and a front of two bays. One of the windows is a casement, and the others are sashes. The doorways are on the sides, the one on the left with a projection on iron posts. At the front is a dwarf brick wall with coping in brick and stone, and two gateways with six obelisk-shaped stone piers. | II |
| 39 Easthorpe and wall 53.07607°N 0.94592°W | | c. 1800 | The house is in brick with stuccoed quoins, dentilled eaves and a pantile roof. There are two storeys and attics and an L-shaped plan, with a front range of three bays. In the centre is a doorway with a fanlight, above it is a blank window, and the other windows are sashes, those in the ground floor with rubbed brick heads. Along the front of the garden is a stone plinth with wrought iron spearhead railings and a gate, and the side walls are in brick with gabled wood coping. | II |
| 85 and 85A King Street; 53.07949°N 0.95230°W | | c. 1800 | A house on a corner site, later used for other purposes, in brick with a hipped slate roof. There are three storeys, an entrance front of three bays, and two bays on the right return. The central doorway has a moulded surround and a fanlight, to its right is a canted bay window, and the other windows are sashes, those in the lower two floors with splayed rendered lintels. The right return has a rendered plinth, a floor band, and in the ground floor is a shop front with a corniced fascia on brackets. | II |
| 16 and 18 Market Place; 53.07783°N 0.95560°W | | c. 1800 | A pair of houses later used for other purposes, in brick, the front rendered and colourwashed, with a hipped slate roof. There are three storeys and two bays. In the ground floor are early 20th-century shop fronts, the right one altered, each with a recessed doorway flanked by windows, and a continuous fascia. The middle floor contains two bow windows with cornices, and in the top floor are four sash windows with moulded surrounds. | II |
| 17 Market Place; 53.07772°N 0.95547°W | | c. 1800 | A house, later an office, in brick, on a rendered plinth, with a channelled rusticated ground floor, stone dressings, chamfered eaves and a hipped slate roof. There are three storeys and a single bay. In the ground floor is a full-width shop front with a door on the right, and on the right return is a doorway with a fanlight and an open pediment on consoles. The upper floors contain sash windows, the window in the middle floor is tall with a rusticated lintel and a semicircular balcony with an iron railing. In the top floor is a smaller window with a rusticated segmental head. | II |
| 1 Westgate; 53.07766°N 0.95550°W | | c. 1800 | A house, later a restaurant, in brick, colourwashed and stuccoed on the front, on a plinth, with a cornice and a sill band on each floor, and a parapet. There are three storeys and three bays; the front is shallow canted. The middle bay is blank, and the outer bays contain sash windows flanked by pilasters. In the left return is a doorway with a fanlight and an ogee-headed shoe scraper, above which is a sash window and a casement window. | II |
| Boundary wall and railing, 61 Spring Hill; 53.07385°N 0.94316°W | | c. 1800 | Along the front of the garden is a brick round-topped dwarf wall with a wrought iron spearhead railing. In the centre is a gate with round-topped stone piers. | II |
| 84 Westgate; 53.07506°N 0.96145°W | | c. 1800 | A cottage at the end of a row, in brick with chamfered eaves and a pantile roof. There are two storeys and a single bay. To the right is a doorway with a segmental head, and the windows are cast iron Gothic casements, those on the front with segmental heads. | II |
| Clinton House; 53.07390°N 0.94313°W | | c. 1800 | A stone house on a plinth, with moulded eaves, and a pantile roof with coped gables. There are two storeys and three bays. The central doorway has a moulded surround, a fanlight, and a hood on curved brackets, and is flanked by shoe scrapers with cusped heads. The windows are sashes with elaborately carved lintels, and between the upper floor windows is an inscribed plaque. | II |
| Boundary wall and gates, Easthorpe Lodge; 53.07605°N 0.94696°W | | c. 1800 | The wall is in brick with stone dressings and coping, and it extends for about 70 metres (230 ft). The gateway has incurving walls, rusticated gate piers and a gate with ramped tops. The outer piers are square and plain, and all the piers have moulded caps. | II |
| Well head, Easthorpe Lodge; 53.07523°N 0.94677°W | — | c. 1800 | The well head is in stone and consists of a box-like structure made in one piece, with a round hole in the bottom. Its fittings and a gate are in wrought iron. | II |
| Grey Friars and wall 53.07621°N 0.94686°W | | c. 1800 | The house is in brick, with cogged eaves and a roof of tile and pantile. There are three storeys and an L-shaped plan, with a front range of two bays, and a two-storey rear wing. In the right bay is a lattice porch, and the windows are sashes, those in the middle floor with a balcony and iron railing. Along the front is a dwarf brick wall with half-round coping in brick and stone, and iron railings. It contains two wrought iron gates, and to the left is a square stone pier. | II |
| Norwell Cottage; 53.07554°N 0.95802°W | | c. 1800 | The house is in brick on a plinth with stone dressings, cogged eaves, and a hipped slate roof. There are two storeys and three bays. In the centre is a projection, with a basket-arched recess containing a round-headed window with a moulded surround, a fanlight, and a hood on wing-shaped brackets. The windows are sashes with rubbed brick heads, and at the ends are round-headed shoe scrapers. To the right is an infilled passage containing a blocked doorway, above which is a sash window, both with segmental heads. | II |
| South Hill House; 53.06295°N 0.96609°W | | c. 1800 | A brick house with stone dressings, a hipped slate roof, two storeys and three bays. The middle bay projects under a pediment, and contains a doorway with a pediment. The windows are sashes. | II |
| The Old Brewmaster's House; 53.08110°N 0.94863°W | | c. 1800 | The house is in brick on a plinth, with stone dressings, rebated eaves and a hipped slate roof. There are two storeys, a front range of three bays, and a recessed wing on the right. The central doorway has a fanlight and a pediment on scroll brackets. The windows are sashes with keystoned lintels, and in front of the wing is a conservatory. | II |
| Burgage Manor and wall 53.07980°N 0.95127°W | | 1801–02 | The house, designed by Richard Ingleman, is stuccoed, on a plinth, with a double floor band, deep eaves and a hipped slate roof. There are three storeys, three bays, the middle bay projecting slightly under a pediment, and a single-storey service wing on the left. In the centre is a portico with four slim Doric columns on pedestals, and an entablature with ball finials. The windows are sashes, those in the middle bay tripartite, and that in the top floor with a segmental head; all have keystoned lintels. Along the front boundary is a dwarf wall with railings, and at the left end a square pier. | II |
| Boundary wall and gate piers, Dunham House; 53.07693°N 0.95640°W | | c. 1805 | The boundary wall is in brick with ramped stone coping, and it extends for about 80 metres (260 ft). The wall contains two pairs of square stucco gate piers with gadrooned caps; the right gateway is blocked, and the left gateway contains wrought iron gates. Beyond, to the left, are incurved walls with square piers. | II |
| Gateway, former House of Correction and adjoining house 53.08066°N 0.94973°W | | 1807 | The gateway has been dedicated as a war memorial, and converted into a house. It is in stone with a single storey, on a plinth, with rusticated quoins and an entablature. In the centre is a round-headed arch with a rusticated surround containing a doorway, a bronze memorial plaque, and a wrought iron railing, and above it is a dummy portcullis. The adjoining house on the left was added in about 1870. It is in red brick with dressings in blue and yellow brick and stone, on a chamfered plinth, with a cogged floor band, polychrome dentilled eaves, and a hipped slate roof. There are two storeys and four bays, the right bay projecting. The second bay projects slightly, with buttresses and a pedimented gable. It contains a round-headed doorway with a moulded surround, dentilled imposts, and a fanlight. The windows are sashes, those in the ground floor with segmental heads. | II |
| Wall, former House of Correction; 53.08131°N 0.94970°W | | 1808 | The boundary wall is in brick with stone coping, it has a rounded southeast corner, and extends for about 80 metres (260 ft). Along Lower Kirklington Road are tapered pyramidal-topped buttresses. | II |
| Southwell Baptish Chapel and adjoining house 53.07416°N 0.95751°W | | 1808 | Originally a workhouse, it was converted onto a chapel and manse in 1836. It is in brick, stuccoed at the front, on a plinth, with stone dressings, a floor band, moulded eaves, a hipped slate roof, and sash windows. The chapel to the right has two storeys and four bays, the left two bays forming a semicircular bow at the front and the rear, and the upper floor windows have round heads. At the right end is a stuccoed porch with a parapet, and an inscription over the door. The house has three storeys and two bays, and flat-headed windows. At the rear is a later extension in brick with a pantile roof, two storeys and three bays. The windows are cross-casements and there is a doorway, all with segmental heads. | II |
| Wall, railing and gate piers, Southwell Baptist Chapel; 53.07411°N 0.95758°W | | 1808 | The low boundary wall is in rendered brick with stone dressings and coping, and wrought iron spearhead railing, and extends for about 45 metres (148 ft). It contains four square gate piers with stone caps and wrought iron gates. | II |
| Former workshops, former House of Correction; 53.08121°N 0.95069°W | | 1817 (possible) | The building, which has been converted for other uses, is in brick with stone dressings and a slate roof. There are three storeys and five bays. On the sides, the lower two floors contain square windows with lintels, and above are semicircular windows. In the northwest side are five square windows, and the northeast side contains a central former loading door, two doorways and larger altered windows. | II |
| Barn at Reg Taylor's Garden Centre; 53.08621°N 0.94325°W | | 1818 | The barn, later used for other purposes, is in colourwashed brick with cogged eaves and a pantile roof. It contains barn doors and groups of patterned vents. | II |
| Ashleigh and wall 53.07718°N 0.95251°W | | 1819 | A brick house incorporating parts of an earlier house, on a plinth, with stone dressings, and a slate roof with coped gables and kneelers. There are three storeys and an L-shaped plan, with a front range of five bays. The windows are sashes with multi-keystoned heads, those in the right bay blank. In the centre is a doorway with a fanlight and a pediment, and in the outer bays are round-headed recesses, the left containing a window, and the right with a door. The garden wall is in brick with chamfered stone coping, containing wrought iron gates flanked by stepped obelisk-shaped stone piers. | II |
| Old Grammar School; 53.07771°N 0.95481°W | | 1819 | The grammar school, later used for other purposes, is in brick on a plinth, with string courses, chamfered eaves and a slate roof. There are three storeys and fronts of five and three bays, the gable end facing the street with a pediment. On the right is a projecting flat-roofed porch with a cornice and a ramped parapet, above which is an inscribed tablet. In the left bay, steps lead up to a recessed round-arched doorway with a fanlight, above which is a blank tablet. The windows are sashes with rubbed brick heads. | II |
| The Elms; 53.07471°N 0.97482°W | | c. 1820 | A farmhouse in brick, on a plinth, with stone dressings and a hipped slate roof. There are two storeys and three bays, the middle bay projecting slightly under a pediment. The central doorway has a fanlight, and the windows on the front are sashes with splayed lintels. | II |
| Garden wall, 41 Church Street; 53.07632°N 0.94988°W | | Early 19th century | The garden wall is in brick with brick gabled coping, and it extends for about 45 metres (148 ft). The wall contains square piers with stone caps, and a wrought iron gate. | II |
| 47 Church Street; 53.07630°N 0.94929°W | | Early 19th century | The house, which is at right angles to the street, is in brick on a rendered plinth, with cogged eaves and a hipped tile roof. There are three storeys, three bays, and a two-storey service wing on the left. In the centre is a doorway with a fanlight, the windows are sashes, and there are blocked windows. On the front, the openings in the lower two floors have splayed lintels, and the windows in the front facing the road have segmental heads. | II |
| 56 Church Street; 53.07612°N 0.94894°W | | Early 19th century | A brick house on a rendered plinth, with stone dressings, dentilled eaves and a slate roof. There are two storeys and three bays. The doorway is in the centre, the windows are sashes, and those in the ground floor have shutters. | II |
| 58 Church Street; 53.07612°N 0.94880°W | | Early 19th century | The house is in brick on a rendered plinth, with rebated eaves and a pantile roof. There are two storeys and two bays. The central doorway has a fanlight, to its left is a large casement window, and the other windows are sashes. All the openings have splayed lintels. | II |
| 62 Church Street; 53.07612°N 0.94869°W | | Early 19th century | Two cottages combined into a house, it is in colourwashed brick on a rendered plinth, and has a pantile roof. There are two storeys and two bays, and all the windows are sashes. On the front is a doorway with two windows to the right and a larger window to the left. All the ground floor openings have segmental heads, and in the upper floor are two windows with flat heads. | II |
| 9 and 11 Easthorpe; 53.07630°N 0.94725°W | | Early 19th century | A pair of mirror-image cottages in brick with stone dressings, rebated eaves and a pantile roof. There are two storeys and two bays. The doorways are in the outer parts and have ogee-headed shoe scrapers, the windows are two-light casements, and all the openings have splayed lintels and keystones. | II |
| 26 and 28 Easthorpe; 53.07588°N 0.94601°W | | Early 19th century | A pair of mirror image cottages and a stable, in brick, with pantile roofs and two storeys. The cottages have rebated eaves and one bay each. The windows are horizontally-sliding sashes, those in the ground floor with shutters. The left cottage has a porch, and the openings in the ground floor have rubbed brick heads. Projecting on the left is the taller stable with a single bay, containing a large doorway in the ground floor and a window above. | II |
| 41 Easthorpe; 53.07603°N 0.94576°W | — | Early 19th century | A house in rendered brick, with rendered lintels, rebated eaves and a pantile roof. There are two storeys and two bays. By the central doorway is a Gothic boot scraper, and the windows are horizontally-sliding sashes. | II |
| 43 Easthorpe; 53.07600°N 0.94568°W | | Early 19th century | The house is in brick on a rendered plinth, and has dentilled eaves and a pantile roof. There are two storeys and a single bay. The doorway is to the right, the windows are horizontally-sliding sashes, and the ground floor openings have segmental heads. | II |
| 45 Easthorpe; 53.07600°N 0.94561°W | | Early 19th century | The house is in brick on a rendered plinth, and has dentilled eaves and a pantile roof. There are two storeys and an attic, and a single bay. The doorway with a fanlight is to the right, the windows are horizontally-sliding sashes, and the ground floor openings have segmental heads. In the attic is a gabled dormer with a casement window. | II |
| 8 King Street; 53.07840°N 0.95469°W | | Early 19th century | Two houses, later three shops, in brick, rendered and colourwashed on the front, with cogged eaves and a hipped pantile roof. There are three storeys and four bays. In the ground floor are three shop fronts, the left one dating from the late 19th century, with pilasters and a fascia on brackets, and those on the right dating from the 20th-century under a common fascia. The upper floors contain sash windows with segmental heads. | II |
| 10 King Street; 53.07843°N 0.95464°W | | Early 19th century | A house, later used for other purposes, in brick, colourwashed at the front, on a stone plinth, with rebated eaves and a pantile roof. There are three storeys and a single bay. In the ground floor is a full-width 19th-century shop front with a doorway to the left, and the upper floors contain sash windows. | II |
| 46–52 King Street; 53.07893°N 0.95357°W | | Early 19th century | A row of four houses later used for other purposes, in brick, the right former house colourwashed, with dentilled eaves and a slate roof. There are three storeys and five bays. In the centre is an elliptical-arched carriage opening, flanked by late 19th-century shop fronts, the left two under a continuous fascia. The upper floors contain sash windows, those in the middle floor with segmental heads. | II |
| 49 and 51 King Street; 53.07922°N 0.95298°W | | Early 19th century | A pair of houses, the right one later used for other purposes, in brick with stone dressings and a slate roof. There are two storeys, and four bays. Each house has a central doorway with a round-headed shoe scraper to the right, and sash windows, all with splayed lintels and keystones. To the right is a round-headed entry. | II |
| 54 King Street; 53.07898°N 0.95333°W | | Early 19th century | A house, later a shop, in brick, the ground floor colourwashed, with chamfered eaves, and a pantile roof with a pedimented gable facing the street. There are two storeys and an attic, and two bays. In the ground floor is a late 19th-century shop front with a plain fascia cornice, and the upper floor and attic contain sash windows with rubbed brick heads. | II |
| 71 and 73 King Street; 53.07932°N 0.95260°W | | Early 19th century | A pair of brick houses with cogged eaves and a pantile roof. There are two storeys and three bays. Steps lead up to the two doorways, the windows are horizontally-sliding sashes, and to the left is a round-arched passage entry. | II |
| 2 and 4 Queen Street; 53.07841°N 0.95518°W | | Early 19th century | A pair of houses, later shops, in brick, the ground floor rendered, on a plinth, with stone dressings, a sill band, rebated eaves and a pantile roof. There are three storeys and three bays. In the ground floor is a full-width shop front with pilasters, and a corniced fascia on scroll brackets. The upper floors contain sash windows, those in the middle floor with segmental heads. | II |
| 11, 13 and 15 Queen Street; 53.07859°N 0.95593°W | | Early 19th century | Three houses, later a Post Office and a shop, in brick with stone dressings, chamfered eaves and a slate roof. There are three storeys and five bays, the alternate bays recessed with dentilled heads. In the central bay is a doorway with a fanlight, to its right is a round-headed entry, further to the right is a shop front and another round-headed entry. To the left of the doorway is a shop window with a cornice, a postbox and a sash window. The other windows are also sashes, and they and the doorway have keystoned lintels. | II |
| 5 and 7 Westgate; 53.07754°N 0.95564°W | | Early 19th century | A pair of houses later used for other purposes, the right house named Minster House. They are in brick with stone dressings, chamfered eaves and a slate roof. There are three storeys and five bays. In the left bay is a shop front with a bow window and a cornice, and to its left is a round-headed entry. The middle bay contains a doorway with pilasters, a semicircular fanlight and an open pediment, and the windows are sashes with multi-keystoned lintels. | II |
| 19 Westgate; 53.07626°N 0.95690°W | | Early 19th century | The house is in brick with chamfered eaves and a hipped slate roof. There are two storeys and a single bay facing the road. On the front is a doorway with a fanlight to the right, and sash windows; all the openings have rubbed brick heads. | II |
| 20 Westgate; 53.07597°N 0.95763°W | | Early 19th century | A brick house with stone dressings, two storeys and three bays. In the centre is a doorway with a fanlight, above it is a blank window, and the other windows are sashes. All the openings have splayed lintels and keystones. | II |
| 23A Westgate; 53.07601°N 0.95720°W | | Early 19th century | The house is stuccoed, on a plinth, with stone dressings, deep eaves with modillions, and a hipped slate roof. There are two storeys and three bays. The central doorway has a fanlight, and is flanked by sash windows. In the upper floor is a blank window in the left bay, and tall sash windows with elliptical balconies and wrought iron railings in the other bays. In the front facing the road are blank windows with segmental heads. | II |
| Orangery north of 50A Westgate; 53.07600°N 0.95990°W | — | Early 19th century | The orangery is in brick on a partly rendered plinth and has a pantile roof. There is a single storey, and a pilastered wooden front with a pedimented gable. In the centre is a glazed door flanked by sash windows, all with round-headed top lights containing Gothic glazing. | II |
| 60, 62 and 66 Westgate; 53.07503°N 0.96046°W | | Early 19th century | A row of four, later three, cottages, in brick, on a rendered plinth, with stone dressings, cogged eaves and pantile roofs. There are two storeys and five bays. Most of the windows are horizontally-sliding sashes, and the openings in the ground floor have segmental heads. | II |
| 33 Westhorpe; 53.07580°N 0.96969°W | | Early 19th century | A cottage in brick with chamfered eaves and a pantile roof. There are two storeys and two bays. To the left is a doorway, and to the right are two sash windows, and all have segmental heads. The upper floor contains casement windows, the left with a segmental head, the right higher with a flat head. | II |
| Bridge House; 53.07630°N 0.94959°W | | Early 19th century | The house is in brick on a plinth, with stone dressings, moulded eaves and a hipped tile roof. There are three storeys and three bays. The central doorway has a reeded surround, and a hood on brackets, and the door has been replaced by a window. The other windows on the front are sashes with keystoned lintels. On the left return is a doorway with a hood on brackets, and above are two blocked windows. | II |
| Burgage Hill Cottage, wall and gate piers 53.07982°N 0.94968°W | | Early 19th century | A brick house with stone dressings, chamfered eaves and a hipped slate roof. There are two storeys, three bays, and a lean-to on the left. The doorway has a rendered surround, and the windows are sashes, those in the ground floor with keystoned lintels. To the right is a brick boundary wall with gabled brick coping, about 10 metres (33 ft) long, and a pair of square brick gate piers with pyramidal stone caps. | II |
| Butler's Lodge; 53.07582°N 0.94554°W | | Early 19th century | The house is in brick with stone dressings and a pantile roof. There are two storeys, two bays, and a rear wing. In the right bay is a round-headed doorway with a moulded surround, a Gothic fanlight and a keystone. The windows are sashes, those on the front with keystoned lintels. In the rear wing is a doorway with a moulded surround and a stone hood. | II |
| Cromwell House; 53.07665°N 0.95651°W | | Early 19th century | Two houses containing internal timber framing, later combined into one, it is in brick with stone dressings, cogged eaves and a pantile roof. There are two storeys and four bays. The doorway has a fanlight and a cornice, and there is a blocked doorway in the right bay. The windows are sashes, and one window is blocked. The ground floor windows and the blocked doorway have splayed lintels. | II |
| Crown Hotel; 53.07790°N 0.95525°W | | Early 19th century | The public house, on a corner site, is in brick with stone dressings and a slate roof. There are three storeys and fronts of three and six bays and a rounded corner. The doorway on Market Place has a rusticated surround and a segmental pediment, and the doorway on Church Street is round-headed, with a chamfered surround, imposts, a keystone and the name in raised letters, and it is flanked by round-headed shoe scrapers. The windows are sashes with splayed lintels and keystones. | II |
| Easthorpe House; 53.07553°N 0.94538°W | — | Early 19th century | The house is in colourwashed roughcast brick, on a plinth, with stone dressings and a hipped slate roof. There are two storeys and a square plan, with fronts of three bays, a lower two-storey service wing on the right, and a two-storey rear wing. The central doorway is round-headed with a moulded surround and a keystone, and the door has a Gothic fanlight. The windows are sashes. | II |
| Boundary wall and gatepiers, Easthorpe House; 53.07561°N 0.94502°W | | Early 19th century | The boundary wall is in brick and stone, and has coping in gabled brick and flat stone. It has an L-shaped plan with a rounded corner. The Easthorpe front contains a pair of square brick piers with pyramidal caps, and on Spring Hill there is ramped coping and a small gateway. | II |
| Stable and potting sheds, Easthorpe Lodge; 53.07515°N 0.94616°W | — | Early 19th century | The stable and potting sheds are in brick with cogged eaves and hipped slate roofs. The stable has two storeys and four bays, and contains a round-headed doorway, and casement windows with segmental heads. The potting sheds have a single storey, and contain sash windows and doors with segmental heads. | II |
| Hardwick House; 53.07883°N 0.95735°W | | Early 19th century | A brick house with stone dressings and a hipped slate roof. There are two storeys and three bays. In the centre is a Classical porch with fluted columns and an entablature, and a doorway that has a fanlight with Gothic tracery. The windows are sashes with keystoned lintels. | II |
| Boundary wall and gate, Hardwick House; 53.07885°N 0.95705°W | | Early 19th century | The wall is in brick, it is stepped and coped, and extends for about 55 metres (180 ft). At the entrance are incurved walls and square piers with stone pyramidal caps, between which steps lead up to a wrought iron gate. | II |
| Boundary wall and gatepiers, Hill House; 53.07871°N 0.94954°W | | Early 19th century | The wall is in stone, the east part with half-round coping, and it extends for about 90 metres (300 ft). The wall contains a pair of square gate piers with plinths and simple pyramidal caps. | II |
| Cartshed, Manor Farm; 53.08686°N 0.94397°W | | Early 19th century | The cartshed is in brick with a pantile roof and a single storey. There are four bays, divided by round-cornered brick piers with flat caps. In the right gable is a square hatch. Internally, there are round-headed brick arches. | II |
| Cottages opposite former manager's house, Maythorne; 53.09312°N 0.96060°W | — | Early 19th century | A row of five cottages in brick, with rebated eaves and pantile roofs. There are three storeys and five bays. The doorways have segmental heads, and the windows are casements, those in the lower two floors with segmental heads. | II |
| Sluice gates and gears, North Mill, Maythorne; 53.09366°N 0.96045°W | | Early 19th century | The pair of sluice gates are in wood, with iron gears and stone abutments. There is a horizontal shaft with worm gearing to large spur wheels, which operate the gates by winding drums and chains. | II |
| Norwell House; 53.07571°N 0.95768°W | | Early 19th century | A coach house converted for residential use, it is in brick on a plinth, with stone dressings, cogged eaves and a hipped slate roof. There are two storeys and three bays, the middle bay projecting slightly and containing a blocked elliptical-arched carriage entrance infilled with a window. To its left is a doorway with a fanlight and a garage door. The windows are sashes with rubbed brick heads, and in the right return is a flat-roofed dormer. | II |
| Pedlar's Cottage; 53.08315°N 0.96329°W | | Early 19th century | A brick house with a pantile roof, two storeys and two bays. The front contains sash windows, those in the ground floor with segmental heads. In the centre of the right gable is a doorway with a Gothic fanlight, flanked by small Gothic windows, and above is a two-light Gothic window. | II |
| Potwell Dyke Bridge; 53.07625°N 0.94972°W | | Early 19th century | The bridge carries Church Street over Potwell Dyke. It is in brick with stone dressings, and consists of a single segmental arch. The parapet walls have gabled brick copings, and round-cornered piers with flat caps. There are two piers on the north side and four on the south side. | II |
| Boundary wall and gatepiers, Rampton Prebend; 53.07725°N 0.95607°W | | Early 19th century | The wall is in brick with half-round coping, and it extends for about 40 metres (130 ft). It contains a pair of chamfered stone gate piers with a small wrought iron gate, and to the right is a large square gate pier with a cap. | II |
| Stenton House; 53.07618°N 0.95701°W | | Early 19th century | The house is in brick with chamfer]ed eaves and tile roofs. There are two storeys and attics, and a street front of seven bays. The third bay is taller, with a pediment containing a lunette. The ground floor is stuccoed with a plinth and a cornice, and contains a doorway flanked by sash windows. The sixth bay contains a doorway with a moulded surround and a fanlight, and elsewhere on the front are sash windows. The garden front is symmetrical, the centre pedimented and containing a French window, above which is a Venetian window and a round-headed window. This is flanked by two-storey canted bay windows. | II |
| Sunnyside; 53.07600°N 0.96951°W | | Early 19th century | A row of five, later four, cottages in brick, with cogged eaves and pantile roofs. There are two storeys and attics, and five bays. On the front are five gabled latticed porches with bargeboards, most of the windows are horizontally-sliding sashes, and the ground floor openings have segmental heads. In the attic are four gabled dormers with bargeboards. | II |
| The Burgage; 53.07945°N 0.95093°W | | Early 19th century | The house is in roughcast and colourwashed, on a plinth, with rebated eaves and hipped slate roofs. Most of the windows are sashes. There are two storeys, and a north front of four bays, the middle two bays projecting. The east front has three bays and contains a central recessed porch with thin iron columns, a doorway with a fanlight, and flanking lights with Gothic glazing, and the rear wing has a conservatory. | II |
| Garden walls, The Burgage; 53.07946°N 0.95057°W | | Early 19th century | The walls enclose the garden on the north, east and south sides, and extend for about 140 metres (460 ft). They are in brick, the north range pebbledashed, with chamfered brick coping. In the north range is a pair of square panelled gate piers with a wrought iron gate, and in the south range is a driveway opening. | II |
| Water pump, The Burgage; 53.07951°N 0.95105°W | | Early 19th century | The water pump is in cast iron and in the form of an obelisk. It has panelled sides, a corniced cap, and a hooked spout at the front with a curved handle on the side. | II |
| Boundary walls and railings, The Hollies; 53.07912°N 0.95769°W | | Early 19th century | The boundary walls are in brick with gabled brick coping, and extend for about 40 metres (130 ft). In front of the house is a dwarf wall with chamfered coping and wrought iron railings, and there is a matching gate to the right. | II |
| The Reindeer public house 53.07583°N 0.95787°W | | Early 19th century | The public house is in brick on a rendered plinth, with stone dressings and a tile roof. There are two storeys and three bays. In the centre is a round-headed doorway with a splayed surround, imposts, a keystone and a fanlight, and the windows are sashes with splayed lintels. | II |
| Gatepiers and Walls, Westhorpe Hall; 53.07552°N 0.97414°W | | Early 19th century | The walls are in red brick with chamfered brick coping, they are curved and ramped, they rise to a height of 8 feet (2.4 m), and extend for about 70 metres (230 ft). The walls contain a pair of square stone gate piers with curved caps. | II |
| Brackenhurst Hall, coach house, orangery and garden wall 53.06294°N 0.96373°W | | 1827–28 | A country house, later a college, in yellow and red brick on a plinth, with stone dressings, a moulded cornice, a balustrade, and roofs of slate and lead. There are two storeys and most of the windows are sashes. The garden front has eight bays, and contains a tetrastyle Ionic portico. Other features include a two-storey bow window on the south front, an octagonal bell tower with a copper ogee dome, and a four-stage water tower. To the left is the former coach house with two storeys and a hipped roof on which is an octagonal turret with a lead dome. To the northeast is the former orangery with a single storey and a pedimented centre with four Doric columns. On the right is a brick garden wall with ramped stone coping, to the southeast is a balustraded wall containing a pair of square piers with moulded tops, and at the southwest is a similar wall containing three square piers with obelisk finials. | II |
| 20 and 22 King Street; 53.07862°N 0.95438°W | | c. 1830 | A pair of houses, later used for other purposes, in brick, the front colourwashed, on a rendered plinth, with rebated eaves and a slate roof. There are two storeys and three bays. In the ground floor are two shop fronts, the left dating from the mid-19th century, with pilasters, and a central doorway flanked by windows with three round-headed lights. In the upper floor are three sash windows. | II |
| Burgage Cottage; 53.07967°N 0.95153°W | | c. 1830 | A brick house with stone dressings, a floor band, chamfered eaves and a slate roof. There are two storeys and two bays. The left bay projects under a gable, in the ground floor is a round-headed recess containing a sash window, and above is a sash window with a round head. The right bay contains a sash window with a segmental head in each floor, and in the left return is a doorway. | II |
| Police station and courthouse 53.08040°N 0.95025°W | | c. 1830 | The courthouse was built first, and the police station was added to the right in 1884. The building is in brick with stone dressings, slate roofs and two storeys. The police station has a chamfered plinth, cogged eaves, four bays, and a double depth plan, and it contains sash windows with keystoned lintels. To the left is a two-storey porch with a coped gable, and corner pilasters. It contains a doorway with a moulded surround, and a segmental fanlight with keystones. To the right is a flat-headed carriage opening with wooden gate piers. The courthouse has three bays, a double depth plan, it contains a doorway with a moulded surround and a fanlight, and the windows are sashes with keystoned lintels. | II |
| Southwell Methodist Church; 53.07814°N 0.95621°W | | 1839 | The church is in brick, the front partly stuccoed, with a slate roof. There are two storeys and a basement, and frons of three and four bays. The entrance front has a moulded pediment containing an inscribed datestone. In the ground floor is a loggia with two Tuscan columns, and a dwarf wall with an elaborate cast iron railing, behind which is a doorway with a fanlight. Above and on the sides are sash windows with rubbed brick heads. At the rear is a later extension. | II |
| 69 Church Street and wall 53.07626°N 0.94852°W | | c. 1840 | The house is in brick on a plinth, with stone dressings, cogged eaves and a slate roof. There are two storeys and an L-shaped plan, with a front range of two bays. The doorway has a fanlight, and the windows are sashes. Along the front is a brick dwarf wall with chamfered stone coping and wrought iron spearhead railings and a gate. The gate piers are square with stone caps. | II |
| 15 Westgate; 53.07657°N 0.95661°W | | c. 1840 | The house is in brick with a colourwashed stucco front, on a plinth, with a channelled floor band, a moulded cornice, a parapet and a hipped slate roof. There are two storeys and three bays. The windows are sashes, the middle window in the upper floor blank. | II |
| Boundary walls and gate piers, 28 and 32 Westgate; 53.07560°N 0.95819°W | — | c. 1840 | The wall is in stone with gabled slab coping. It contains a pair of square gate piers with ball finials and a pair of wrought iron gates. To the right is a pair of shouldered stone obelisk-shaped gate piers with a wrought iron gate. | II |
| 32 Westgate; 53.07551°N 0.95852°W | | c. 1840 | A brick house on a plinth, with stone dressings, moulded eaves and slate roofs. There are two storeys, fronts of three and two bays, canted on the corner, and a rear wing of four bays. The main round-headed doorway has a moulded surround, panelled pilasters and a keystone. The windows are sashes, some blank, with splayed lintels and keystones. The windows and the doorway in the rear wing have segmental heads. | II |
| Park View House; 53.07572°N 0.95817°W | — | c. 1840 | The house is in brick on a rendered plinth, with stone dressing, chamfered eaves and a hipped slate roof. There are two storeys and three bays. In the left bay is a doorway with a fanlight, and the windows are sashes, the middle one in the upper floor blank. All the openings have gabled panelled lintels. | II |
| The Old Police House; 53.08046°N 0.94999°W | | c. 1840 | The police house, later a private house, is in brick on a plinth, with chamfered eaves and a slate roof. There are two storeys and two bays, and a recessed single-bay entrance to the right. The doorway has an elliptical head, and the windows are sashes with splayed lintels. | II |
| Laundrette; 53.07901°N 0.95381°W | | 1841 | A house later a laundrette, in brick, colourwashed on the front, with dentilled eaves and a slate roof. There are three storeys and three bays. In the ground floor is a shop front with a central doorway, flanking windows, and a 19th-century fascia on brackets. The upper floors contain sash windows, those in the middle bay blind. | II |
| Holy Trinity Church and wall 53.07432°N 0.96131°W | | 1844–46 | The church, designed by Hadfield and Weightman in Early English style, is built in stone with slate roofs. It consists of a nave with a clerestory, north and south aisles, a north porch, a chancel, a vestry and a west steeple. The steeple has a tower with three stages, a double-chamfered plinth, gabled angle buttresses, three string courses, a trefoiled corbel table, and an octagonal broach spire with three tiers of gabled lucarnes. There is a west doorway with a moulded surround and a cusped head, lancet windows and double lancet bell openings, and to the southeast is an octagonal stair turret with a pyramidal head. To the northwest of the church is a stone boundary wall with stepped gabled coping, a pair of gate piers with pyramidal caps, and a wrought iron gate. | II |
| Outbuildings and water pump, 40 and 42 Westhorpe; 53.07590°N 0.97074°W | | Mid 19th century | The outbuildings are in brick with a pantile roof and a single storey. On the front is a horizontally-sliding sash window with a lead pump in a wooden case to its left, and there are two doorways with segmental heads. | II |
| Boundary wall and gatepiers, Honing House; 53.07515°N 0.96267°W | | Mid 19th century | The wall is in brick with half-round stone coping. In the centre is a pair of square brick gate piers with stone caps, and to the right is a pair of round cast iron gate piers with finials and a pair of wrought iron gates. | II |
| The Grey House; 53.07947°N 0.95117°W | | c. 1860 | The house is in yellow brick on a chamfered plinth, with stone dressings, chamfered eaves, and a slate roof with coped shaped gables with kneelers. There are two storeys and three bays, each bay projecting under a gable containing a blank shield. In the centre is a round-headed doorway with a moulded surround flanked by round-headed shoe scrapers. The windows are sashes with moulded surrounds, those in the ground floor and above the doorway with round heads and hood moulds, and the others with rounded top corners. | II |
| Normanton Hall and wall 53.08470°N 0.94135°W | | c. 1870 | A country house incorporating earlier material, in yellow brick on a plinth, with stone dressings, notched eaves, and a slate roof with traceried bargeboards to the main gables. There are two storeys and attics, and fronts of three and four bays. The outer bays of the entrance front are gabled, and in the middle bay is a two-storey porch with octagonal pilasters and a coped parapet, containing a doorway with a Tudor arch and a Gothic fanlight. The windows are sashes with Gothic glazing and hood moulds. The garden front has three gables, and contains sash and casement windows, a French window, and a canted bay window. The boundary wall to the northwest is in brick with flat stone coping, and it contains a gate. | II |
| Boundary wall, Normanton Hall; 53.08490°N 0.94132°W | — | c. 1870 | The wall extends for about 60 metres (200 ft). The west part is in stone, and has a square pier with a pyramidal cap. The east part is in brick with stepped double-gabled coping. It contains a pair of gate piers with pyramidal caps, and a wrought iron field gate with round iron posts. | II |
| Stable range and wall Normanton Hall; 53.08452°N 0.94102°W | | c. 1870 | The stable range is in yellow brick with stone dressings and slate roofs. There are two parallel ranges, each with a single storey and six bays. The gable ends face the road, they have traceried bargeboards, and each contains a hatch with Gothic fretwork and a hood mould. Between the ranges is a gateway flanked by square piers with caps, and to the left is a brick boundary wall with stepped stone coping containing a doorway. | II |
| Station House; 53.08182°N 0.94668°W | | 1871 | The stationmaster's house and waiting room were built by the Midland Railway, and converted into a private house in about 1976. It is in yellow brick on a plinth, with stone dressings, quoins, and slate roofs, the gables with a band, wavy bargeboards and finials. There are two storeys, a cruciform plan, and fronts of two bays. On the front is a gabled porch containing a segmental-headed doorway with a rebated surround, and the windows are casements. On the platform side is a two-storey canted bay window and a through-eaves dormer. | II |
| Former Sunday School; 53.08004°N 0.95829°W | | c. 1875 | The Sunday school, later converted for residential use, is in Gothic Revival style. It is in red brick on a plinth, with dressings in blue brick and stone, chamfered eaves, and a slate roof with coped gables and crosses, and surmounted by a louvred ventilator. There is a single storey and three bays. In the middle bay is a gabled porch containing a doorway with a chamfered surround, a fanlight and a hood mould. The outer bays project under gables, each containing a graduated shouldered triple lancet window with mullions and a hood mould, over which is a quatrefoil with a moulded oval surround. | II |
| Garden walls and potting sheds, Brackenhurst Hall; 53.06392°N 0.96322°W | | Late 19th century | The garden walls are in brick with ramped stone coping and square corner piers, and form a rectangular plan with sides of about 100 metres (330 ft) by 70 metres (230 ft). The south side has a deeply scalloped top and a central wrought iron gate with an overthrow, and square piers with moulded caps and ball finials. On the east and west sides are similar openings without gates. The west side has two pairs of potting sheds with dentilled eaves and pantile roofs, each with a doorway and flanking lights in the form of a Diocletian window. Inside the north wall are lean-to greenhouses and fruit shelters. | II |
| Garden arch, Clyde House; 53.07560°N 0.95688°W | — | Late 19th century | The ornamental arch re-uses fragments of mid-14th century-style tracery. The uprights are made from coping stones, carrying a cusped ogee window head forming an arch. | II |
| Lodge, Brackenhurst Hall; 53.06330°N 0.96530°W | | c. 1899 | The lodge is roughcast, on a plinth, with stone dressings and a slate roof with modillion gables. There are two storeys, a cruciform plan, and three bays. The main front has a three-bay Tuscan portico, and most of the windows are casements. In the east and north fronts, the gable contains an oval window with four keystones, and in the west gable is a Venetian window with a keystone. | II |
| Gateway and railings, Brackenhurst Hall; 53.06323°N 0.96545°W | | c. 1900 | Flanking the entrance to the drive is a pair of panelled square stone gate piers with plinths, cornices and pineapple finials, and between them are ornamental wrought iron gates and an overthrow. Outside the piers are incurved dwarf walls with railings, ending in square panelled piers without finials. | II |
| War memorial 53.07958°N 0.95032°W | | c. 1920 | The war memorial stands by a road junction, and is in stone. It consists of a cross with an octagonal shaft, on an octagonal pedestal, on a base of two moulded steps. There are inscriptions on the pedestal, and on the front of the cross are a wreath and a cross in bronze. | II |
| Telephone kiosk, Easthorpe; 53.07609°N 0.94761°W | | 1935 | The K6 type telephone kiosk in Easthorpe was designed by Giles Gilbert Scott. Constructed in cast iron with a square plan and a dome, it has three unperforated crowns in the top panels. | II |
| Telephone kiosk, Maythorne; 53.09306°N 0.96078°W | | 1935 | The K6 type telephone kiosk in Maythorne was designed by Giles Gilbert Scott. Constructed in cast iron with a square plan and a dome, it has three unperforated crowns in the top panels. | II |
| Telephone kiosk, Westgate; 53.07672°N 0.95664°W | | 1935 | The K6 type telephone kiosk in Westgate was designed by Giles Gilbert Scott. Constructed in cast iron with a square plan and a dome, it has three unperforated crowns in the top panels. | II |
