= Holy Trinity Church, Southwell =

Coordinates: 53°04′28″N 00°57′39″W

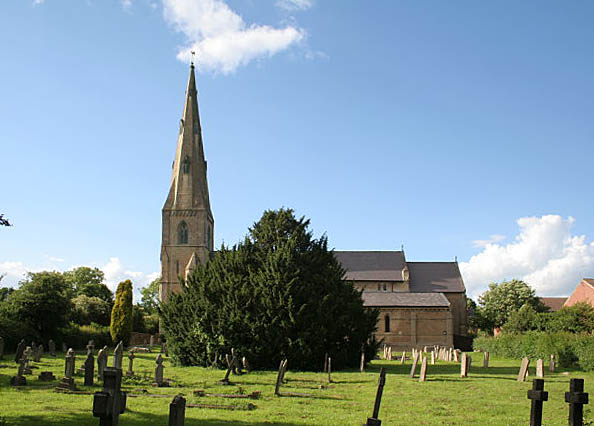
- Holy Trinity Church, Southwell
- Denomination: Church of England
- Churchmanship: Evangelical
- Website: www.holytrinitysouthwell.co.uk

History
- Dedication: Holy Trinity

Administration
- Province: York
- Diocese: Southwell and Nottingham
- Parish: Southwell, Nottinghamshire

Clergy
- Vicar: Rev'd Jon Morley

Holy Trinity Church, Southwell is a parish church in the Church of England in Southwell, Nottinghamshire.

The church is Grade II listed by the Department for Culture, Media and Sport as it is a building of special architectural or historic interest.

== History ==
The church was built in 1844 to 1846 by Weightman and Hadfield of Sheffield in the early English style It cost £2,500 to build (equivalent to £251,980 as of 2025),.

== Incumbents ==
- Revd John Connington 1846–1878
- ?
- Canon Ernest Arthur Coghill 1890–1941
- ?
- Canon Ian Keith Wrey Savile 1974 - 1980
- Revd Edward Anthony Colin Cardwell 1981 - 1992
- Canon Mark Stuart Tanner 1993 - 2013
- Revd Andrew Porter 2013 - 2023
- Revd Jonathan Morley 2025 -

== Organ ==
The church pipe organ was built by Gray and Davison in 1867. It was restored by Bishop in 1892 and Norman and Beard in 1913. A specification of the organ as recorded in 1975 can be found on the National Pipe Organ Register. The organ is no longer present.

=== Organists ===
- Miss A.E. Calvert
- Oswald Linton ca. 1939

== See also ==
- Listed buildings in Southwell, Nottinghamshire
