= Ingleby =

Ingleby may refer to:

== Places ==
- Ingleby, Derbyshire, England, a hamlet and civil parish
- Ingleby, Lincolnshire, England, a hamlet
- Ingleby, Pennsylvania, United States, a ghost town

== People ==
- Charles Ingleby (died 1719), English judge
- Charles Ingleby (cricketer) (1870–1939), cricketer
- Francis Ingleby (c. 1551–1586), Roman Catholic martyr
- Harley Ingleby, Australian longboard surfrider
- Holcombe Ingleby (1854–1926), English solicitor and politician
- James Ingleby (born 1945), Scottish Lord-Lieutenant of Aberdeenshire
- Jane Ingleby, 17th-century English recusant and female soldier
- John Ingleby (disambiguation)

- John Ingleby (bishop) (1434–1499), Bishop of Llandaff, Wales
- Sir John Ingleby, 3rd Baronet (1664–1742), of the Ingilby baronets
- Sir John Ingleby, 4th Baronet (c. 1705–1772), of the Ingilby baronets
- John Ingleby (painter) (1749–1808), Welsh watercolour painter
- Sir John Ingilby, 1st Baronet (1758–1815), English politician
- John Ingleby (Australian politician) (1829–1907), politician in South Australia

- Lee Ingleby (born 1976), British actor
- Ray Ingleby, English businessman

== Titles ==
- Ingilby baronets, three baronetcies created for members of the Ingilby family
- Viscount Ingleby, a title in the Peerage of the United Kingdom

== See also ==
- Ingleby Arncliffe, North Yorkshire, England
- Ingleby Barwick, North Yorkshire, England
- Ingleby Greenhow, North Yorkshire, England
- Ingleby Homestead, Victoria, Australia
