= Ingilby baronets, of Ripley Castle and Harrington (1866) =

Escutcheon of the Ingilby baronets of Ripley Castle and Harrington

The Ingilby baronetcy, of Ripley Castle in the County of York and of Harrington in the County of Lincoln, was created in the Baronetage of the United Kingdom on 26 July 1866 for Henry Ingilby. He was the eldest son of the Rev. Henry Ingilby, brother of the 1st Baronet of the 1781 creation, and had succeeded to the family estates on the death of his cousin the 2nd Baronet.

== Ingilby baronets, of Ripley Castle and Harrington (1866) ==
- Sir Henry John Ingilby, 1st Baronet (1790–1870)
- Sir Henry Day Ingilby, 2nd Baronet (1826–1911)
- Sir William Ingilby, 3rd Baronet (1829–1918)
- Sir William Henry Ingilby, 4th Baronet (1874–1950)
- Sir Joslan William Vivian Ingilby, 5th Baronet (1907–1974)
- Sir Thomas Colvin William Ingilby, 6th Baronet (born 1955)

The heir apparent to the baronetcy is James William Francis Ingilby (born 1985), eldest son of the 6th Baronet and his wife, Emma, Lady Ingilby.
