= John Ingleby =

John Ingleby or Ingilby may refer to:

== People ==
- John Ingleby (bishop) (1434–1499), Bishop of Llandaff, Wales
- Sir John Ingleby, 3rd Baronet (1664-1742), of the Ingilby baronets
- Sir John Ingleby, 4th Baronet (c.1705-1772), of the Ingilby baronets
- John Ingleby (painter) (1749-1808), Welsh water colour painter patronised by Thomas Pennant
- Sir John Ingilby, 1st Baronet (1758-1815), MP for East Retford
- John Ingleby (Australian politician), represented the South Australian electorate of Victoria 1875-1877
