= Thomas Ingilby =

Thomas Ingilby is the name of:

- Sir Thomas Ingilby (c. 1290-1352), acquired Ripley Castle by marriage
- Sir Thomas Ingilby (1310–1369), of Ripley Castle, knighted after saving king
- Sir Thomas Colvin William Ingilby, 6th Baronet (born 1955)
