= RLF =

RLF may refer to:

- RLF (gene) (rearranged L-myc fusion), a human zinc finger protein
- Romanian Land Forces
- Royal Literary Fund
- Revolving Loan Fund
- Retrolental fibroplasia
