= Ingilby baronets of Ripley Castle (1781) =

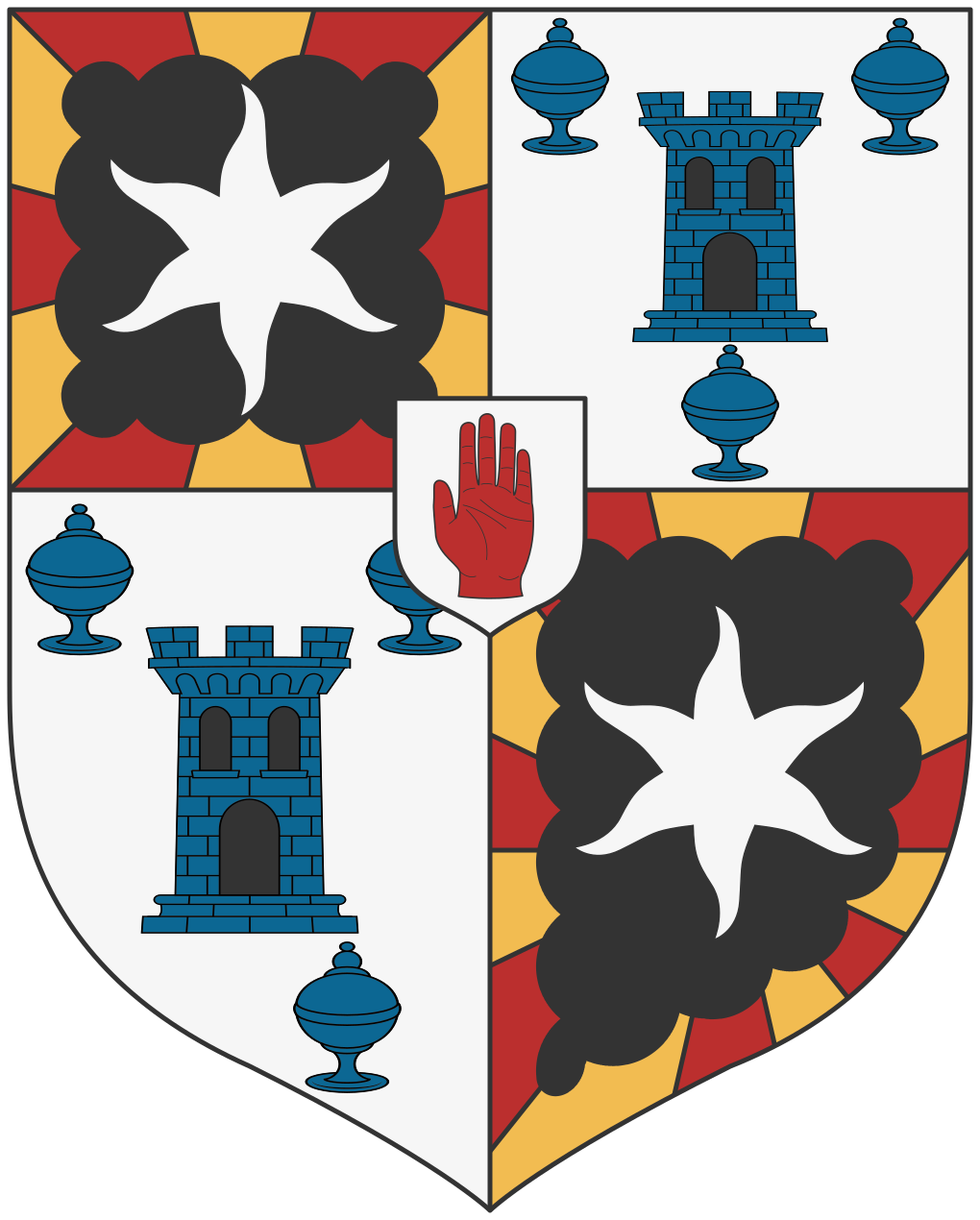
Escutchein of the Amcotts-Ingilby baronets

The Ingilby baronetcy, of Ripley Castle in the County of York, was created in the Baronetage of Great Britain on 8 June 1781 for John Ingilby. He was the illegitimate son of the 4th Baronet of the 1642 creation and had succeeded to the Ingilby estates on the death of his father. He later represented East Retford in the House of Commons.

His son, the 2nd Baronet, sat as a Member of Parliament for East Retford, Lincolnshire and Lincolnshire North. He had already in 1807 succeeded his maternal grandfather in the Amcotts Baronetcy of Kettlethorp Park according to a special remainder. On his death in 1854 both baronetcies became extinct.

== Ingilby, later Amcotts-Ingilby baronets, of Ripley Castle (1781) ==
- Sir John Ingilby, 1st Baronet (1758–1815)
- Sir William Amcotts-Ingilby, 2nd Baronet (1783–1854)

== Notes ==
Baronetage of Great Britain
Preceded by Coghill baronets	Ingilby baronets of Ripley Castle; 8 June 1781	Succeeded by Craufurd baronets
