= Johann Gottlieb Tielke =

German army officer and writer (1731–1787)

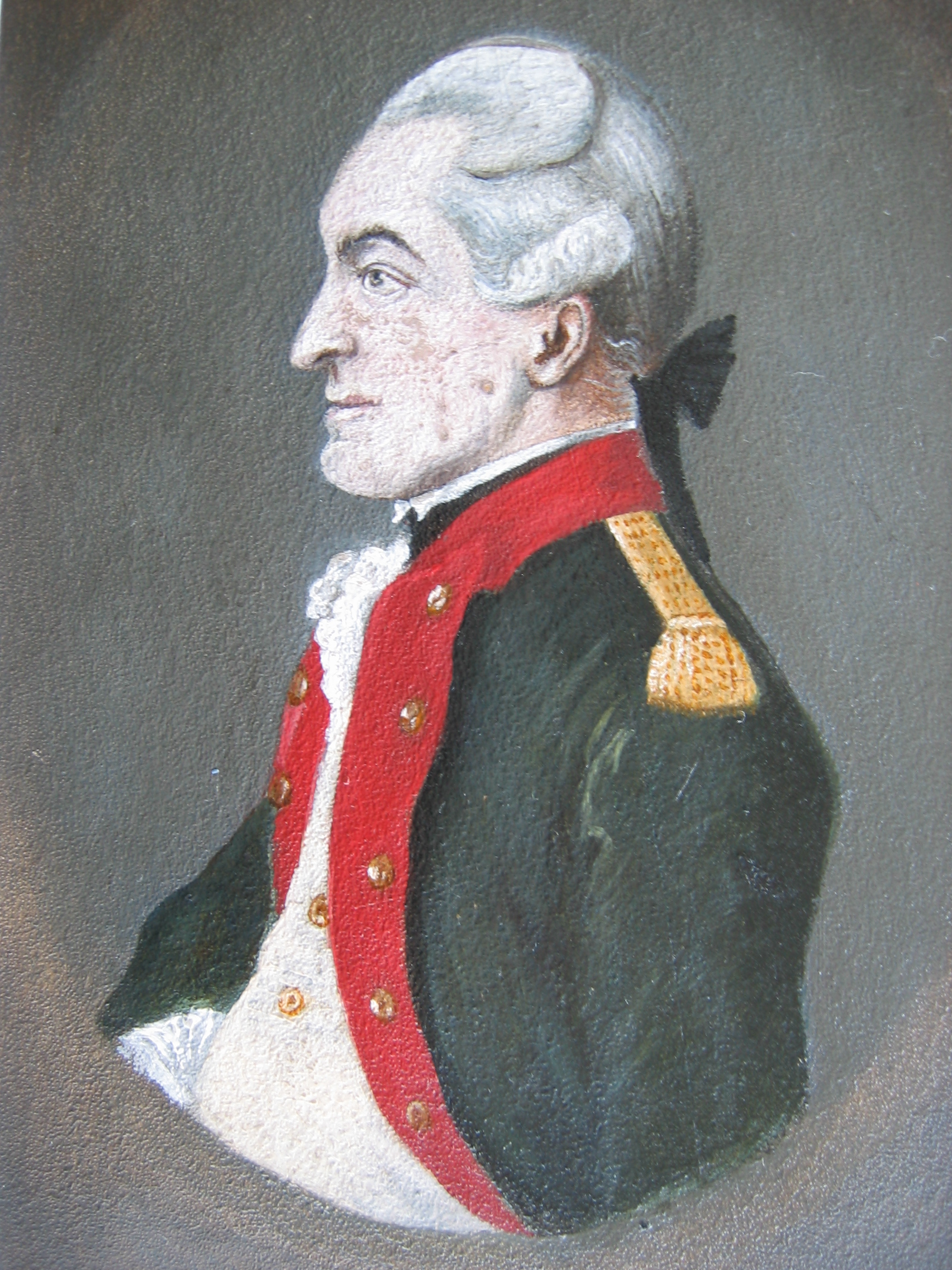
Johann Gottlieb Tielke

Johann Gottlieb Tielke (2 July 1731, in Tautenburg near Jena – 6 November 1787, in Freiberg) was an army officer and an internationally recognized military writer.

== Military career ==
Tielke fell into poverty and an uncertain future through the sudden death of his father. Consequently, in 1751 he enlisted in the army of Saxony in the infantry regiment Herzog von Sachsen-Weißenfels as a common soldier. Because of his small stature and unprepossessing appearance, his military career was not without problems. However, his skills, especially in drawing, and his enthusiastic service impressed his military superiors. Thus, he was in 1753 transferred to Dresden in the Hausartilleriecompagnie, and the royal authorities authorized his preparation for the artillery qualification test. Additionally, he was enabled to attend lectures in the engineering academy.

In 1756 he became a prisoner of war with the entire army in Prussia. Because of his small stature, he succeeded in escaping, disguised as a milkmaid. He went to Warsaw, where he could present to the military commander cartographic military information based upon his prison-of-war experiences. Tielke was promoted from lance-bombardier to bombardier and transferred to Silesia, where he took part in the siege of Schweidnitz. In 1758 he participated in the shelling of Küstrin. When the Austrians took Dresden, he communicated the news to Prince Xavier. This resulted in Tielke's promotion to Stückjunker (lowest commissioned officer rank).

In 1760 he was a participant in the Battle of Torgau. He was lightly wounded and his horse was killed. The Prince of Saxony's intercession led to Tielke's promotion to Souslieutenant (second lieutenant). In 1761 he belonged to the army of Prince Albrecht of Saxony. In 1762 Tielke's unit was stationed in Silesia. After the Seven Years' War, the Saxon troops were redeployed. Tielke was promoted to Premierlieutenant and then Stabscapitän. During the War of the Bavarian Succession, he commanded an artillery battery as Compagniechef. During the remainder of his career, he was garrisoned mainly at Freiberg, where he died on 6 November 1787.

=== Promotions ===
- 1753: Konstabler (lance-bombardier, lowest non-commissioned officer rank)
- 1756: Feuerwerker (bombardier)
- 1759: Stückjunker (lowest commissioned officer rank)
- 1760: Souslieutenant (second lieutenant)
- 1762: Premierlieutenant (first lieutenant)
- 1769: Stabscapitän (rank between first lieutenant and captain )

== Writing career ==
Although, because of his parents' poverty, Tielke had not received any academic training, he became a world-class expert on military fortifications, intelligence, artillery, tactics, and strategy. On these subjects he published several treatises, which were republished numerous times and translated into English and French. His writings were acknowledged in other German principalities and by Frederick the Great of Prussia. Tielke declined offers of military service several times from the Russian Tsar and from the Prussian King because he felt bound to Saxony.

In Tielke's Nachlass there is a volume of poems composed by him.

== Family ==
Tielke's first wife was part of the French colony in Leipzig; they had two sons and five daughters. After the death of his first wife, he remarried but there were no children from his second marriage.

== Selected publications ==
- Eigenschaften und Pflichten eines Soldaten zur Prüfung derer, die es sind, und derer, die in diesen Stand treten wollen, nebst einem Anhang aus Xenophons Rückzug der zehntausend Griechen. Von einem Officiere. Dresden und Leipzig, 1773
- Unterricht für Officiere, die sich zu Feldingenieurs ausbilden wollen, durch Beispiele aus dem 7jähr. Kriege erläutert. Mit 29 Pl.. Dresden und Leipzig, 1774.
  - French translation: Instruction pour les officiers qui se destinent au génie militaire, de Jean Gottlieb Tielke, Capitaine d’artillerie au service de l’électeur de Saxe.
- Beyträge zur Kriegs-Kunst und Geschichte des Krieges von 1756 bis 1763. Mit ca. 50 Krtn. u. Plän. Barthel, Freiberg, 1777, 1. bis 6. Stück (Band 1-6). Reprint durch Archiv-Verlag Braunschweig
  - English translation by Charles Gregan Craufurd & Robert Craufurd: An account of some of the most remarkable events of the war between the Prussians, Austrians, and Russians, from 1756 to 1763; and a treatise on several branches of the military art. 1787
  - English translation by Edwin Hewgill: The field engineer: or instructions upon every branch of field fortification: Demonstrated by examples which occurred in the Seven Years War between the Prussians, the Austrians, and the Russians; with plans and explanatory notes. Translated from the fourth edition of the German original of J.G. Tielke, Late Captain of Artillery in the service of H.S.H. the Elector of Saxony. 2 vols., London, 1789
  - Vol. 1: Das Treffen von Maxen
    - French translation: Mémoires pour servir à l'art et l'histoire de la guerre de 1756 jusqu'à 1763, avec les plans et les cartes requises. 1. L'affaire de Maxen, avec un traité de l'attaque et de la défense des hauteurs et montagnes non retranchéesaus, Freyberg, 1777
  - Vol. 2: Der Feldzug der Kayserlich-Rußischen und Königlich-Preußischen Völker im Jahre 1758. Barthel, Freiberg, 1776. Reprint durch Archiv-Verlag, Braunschweig
  - Vol. 3: Über den Feldzug von 1761
  - Vol. 4: Die drey Belagerungen und Loudonsche Ersteigung der Festung Schweidnitz in den Feldzügen von 1757 bis 1762. Barthel, Freiberg, 1781, Reprint durch Archiv-Verlag, Braunschweig
  - Vol. 5: Über den Feldzug von 1761 des Herzogs von Württemberg in Pommern mit Betrachtungen über die Feldbefestigungskunst
  - Vol. 6: Betrachtungen über die Feldbefestigungskunst
- Gebete und Psalmen für Kriegsleute. Von einem Offizier. Dresden, 1779
- Unterricht für die Officiers, die sich zu Feld-Ingenieurs bilden, oder doch den Feldzügen mit Nutzen beywohnen wollen, durch Beyspiele aus dem letzten Kriege erläutert, und mit nötigen Plans versehen. Dresden 1769, 2., mit vielen Zusätzen und einigen Plans verm. Aufl. 1774; Gerlach, Dresden und Leipzig, 1779; 4. Aufl., Wien 1785. Reprint Marcus von Salisch (ed.), Militärgeschichtliches Forschungsamt Potsdam, BoD Norderstedt, 2010, ISBN 9783941571105
