= Ingley =

Ingley is a surname. Notable people with the surname include:

- Alice Ingley (born 1993), Australian archer
- Fred Ingley (1878–1951), British-born American Episcopal bishop
- Milton Ingley (1946–2006), American pornographic actor, producer, and director

== See also ==
- Ingleby (disambiguation)
