= 1818 English cricket season =

Cricket season review

The 1818 English cricket season was the 32nd since the foundation of Marylebone Cricket Club (MCC). George Osbaldeston lost his MCC membership. Details of three historically important eleven-a-side matches are known. (Note: Any match listed in the ACS' Important Match Guide (1981) is historically important, and therefore of the highest standard, whether or not a scorecard might exist. The same applies to numerous matches discovered by researchers since 1981. For further information, see First-class cricket.)

== Events ==
- William Lambert's patron George Osbaldeston struck his name from the MCC members list in anger in 1818. He later repented and tried to restore himself but his application was blocked by his enemy, Lord Frederick Beauclerk. Osbaldeston could no longer play at Lord's and that effectively ended his career.
- With cricket still recovering from the effects of the Napoleonic War, a total of only three matches were recorded in 1818:
  - 1–2 June — E H Budd's XI v W Ward's XI @ Lord's Cricket Ground
  - 22–23 June — Marylebone Cricket Club (MCC) v Hampshire @ Lord's Cricket Ground
  - 17–19 August — Marylebone Cricket Club (MCC) v Hampshire @ Lord's Cricket Ground

== Bibliography ==
- ACS (1981). A Guide to Important Cricket Matches Played in the British Isles 1709–1863. Nottingham: ACS. OCLC 85045528.
- Haygarth, Arthur (1996) [1862]. Scores & Biographies, Volume 1 (1744–1826). Kennington: Frederick Lillywhite. ISBN 978-19-00592-23-9.
- Warner, Pelham (1946). Lords: 1787–1945. London: Harrap. OCLC 877106024.
