= Jane Ingleby =

English recusant and woman soldier

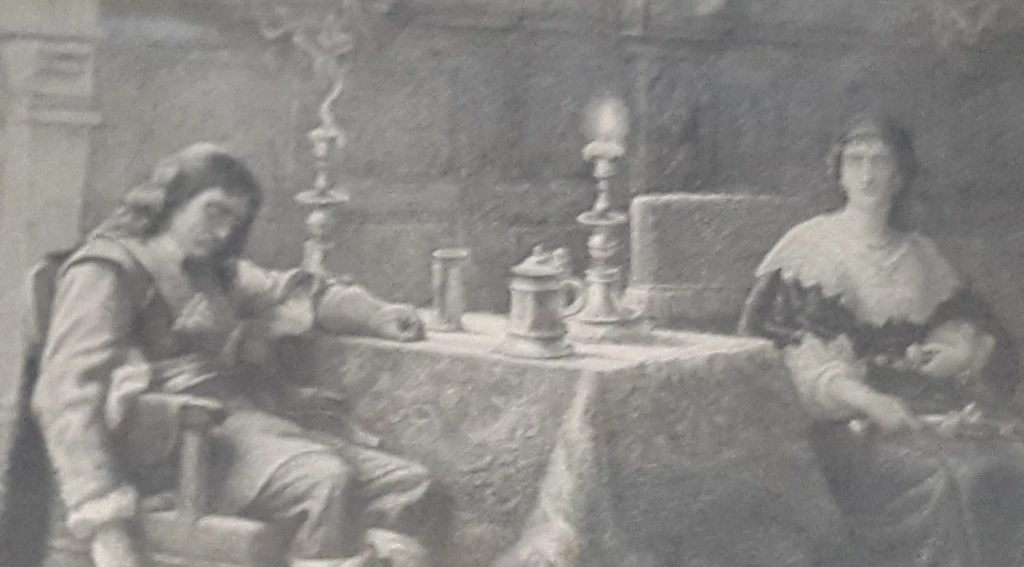
- Victorian period print of Jane Ingleby (right) holding Oliver Cromwell (left) at gunpoint.
- Born: Spofforth Castle, North Yorkshire, England
- Died: 1651
- Resting place: Ripley Castle, North Yorkshire, England
- Children: Sampson Ingleby; Jane Lambert
- Relatives: Sir William Ingleby, 1st Baronet (brother)
- Family: Ingleby

Jane Ingleby of Ripley Castle (died 1651), also known as Trooper Jane, was an English recusant and, according to legend, a female soldier in the Battle of Marston Moor. Ingleby reportedly fought in battle during the English Civil War, dressed as a man in a full suit of armor. After retreating to Ripley Castle following the Royalists' loss at Marston Moor, she held Oliver Cromwell at gunpoint overnight in the castle library to prevent him from searching the house for her brother, Sir William Ingleby, 1st Baronet.

== Early life and family ==
Ingelby was the daughter of Sampson Ingleby, a member of the landed gentry and a steward for Henry Percy, 9th Earl of Northumberland, and Jane Lambert of Killinghall. She had four sisters and two brothers. The family lived at Spofforth Castle, where her father was employed. Their relatives were involved in the Gunpowder Plot in 1605. Ingleby was related to Francis Ingleby, a Catholic priest and martyr.

In January 1618, her brother William Ingleby, inherited Ripley Castle from their uncle, Sir William Ingleby. She moved to Ripley Castle with her brother. King Charles I created her brother as Baronet Ingelby in 1642.

== English Civil War ==
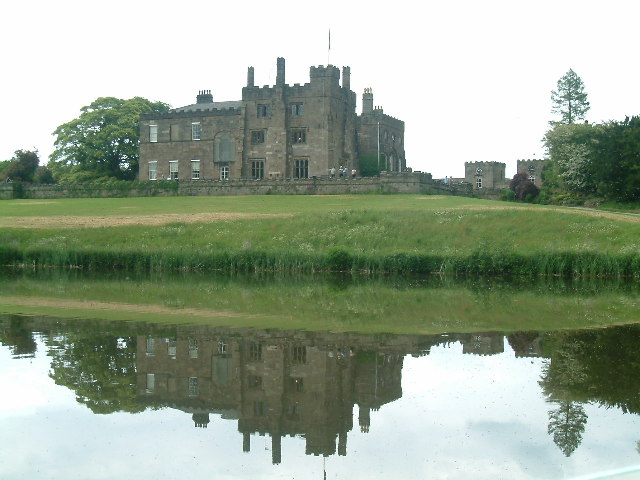
Ripley Castle

The Ingelby family were Catholic and staunch royalists who supported the Stuart king Charles I. During the English Civil War, she reportedly fought alongside her brother, Sir William, in the Battle of Marston Moor in 1644 while disguised as a man in a full suit of armour. They lost the battle to the Roundhead and retreated to Ripley Castle. As Oliver Cromwell approached the estate, her brother hid in a secret priest hole. When Cromwell arrived at the house, he was initially denied entry by Jane Ingleby, who claimed to fear for her honour and virtue. She convinced Cromwell to make his soldiers sleep outside of the castle and in the local church. Reluctantly, she eventually allowed Cromwell to enter the castle, but held him at gun point in the library for the entire night, preventing him from searching the house. Cromwell left the next morning without searching the castle. Afterward, Ingleby was referred to as "Trooper Jane".

Ingelby lived her final years working on a nearby farm in North Yorkshire to help pay off Parliament-imposed fines on her Royalist and recusant family. She died before the restoration of the English monarchy, and was buried at Ripley Castle on 20 December 1651.

== Legacy ==
Crack Shot Ale, a beer produced by Daleside Brewery in Harrogate, is named in honor of Ingelby.

Eleanor Jane Ingilby, daughter of Sir Thomas Colvin William Ingilby, 6th Baronet, is named after Jane Ingleby.
