= Amcotts baronets =

British politician (1796-1856)

Escutcheon of the Amcotts baronets of Kettlethorpe Park

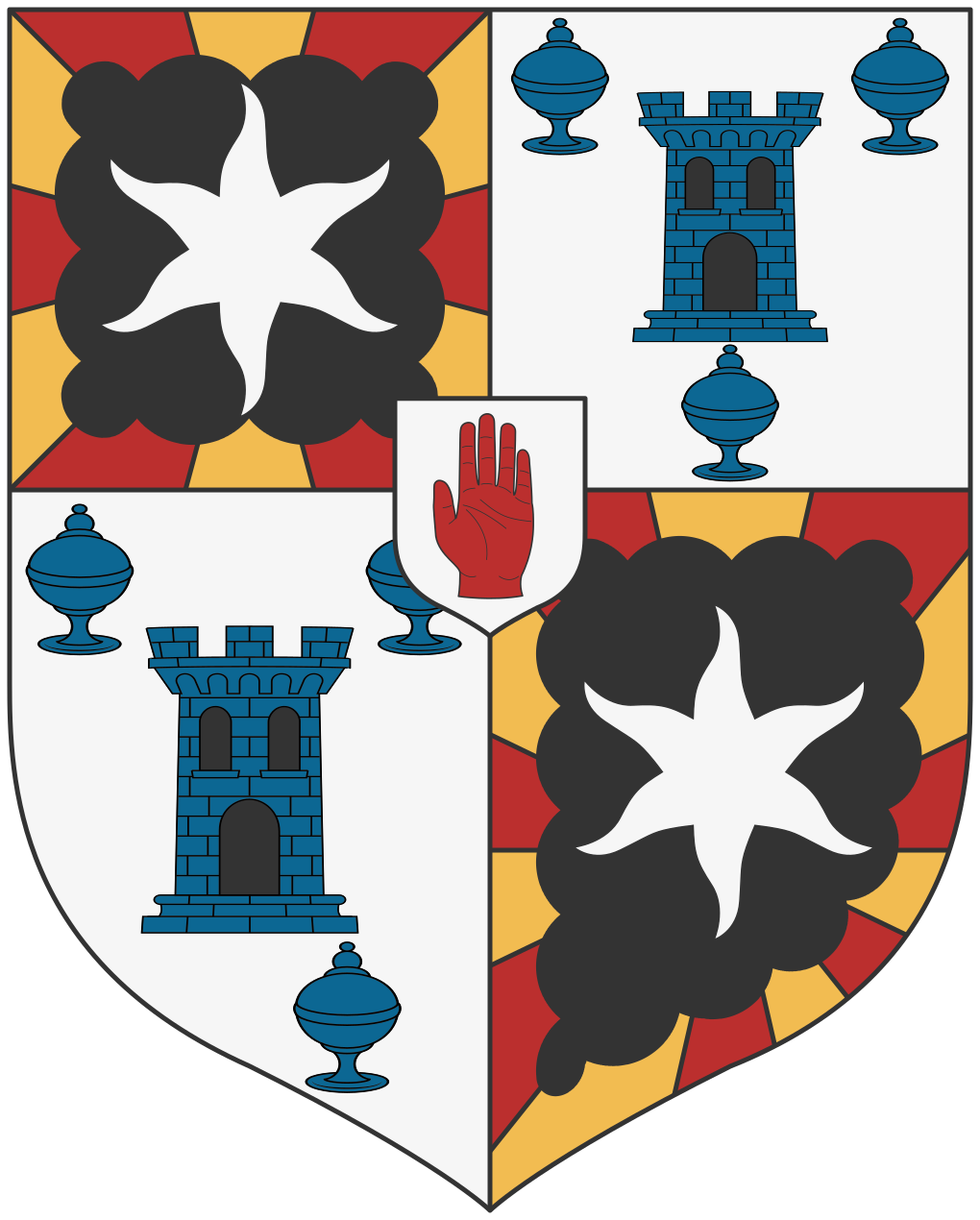
Escutcheon of the Amcotts-Ingilby baronets of Ripley Castle and of Kettlethorpe Park

The Amcotts baronetcy, of Kettlethorpe Park in the County of Lincoln, was created in the Baronetage of Great Britain on 11 May 1796 for Wharton Amcotts. Originally Wharton Emerson, he took the surname Amcotts in 1777, when he succeeded to the estates of Charles Amcotts, his brother-in-law. He represented East Retford in the House of Commons, from 1780 to 1790, and from 1792 to 1802.

He was succeeded according to a special remainder by the 2nd Baronet, his daughter's son William Ingilby, who in 1815 also succeeded his father in the Ingilby baronetcy of Ripley Castle. Both titles became extinct on his death in 1854.

== Amcotts later Ingilby later Amcotts-Ingilby baronets, of Kettlethorpe Park (1796) ==
- Sir Wharton Amcotts, 1st Baronet (1740–1807)
- Sir William Amcotts-Ingilby, 2nd Baronet (1783–1854)

== See also ==
- Ingilby baronets, of Ripley Castle

== Notes ==
Baronetage of Great Britain
| Preceded by Hippisley baronets | Amcotts baronets of Kettlethorpe Park; 11 May 1796 | Succeeded by Cradock-Hartopp baronets |
