= Charles Craufurd =

British soldier

Lieutenant-General Sir Charles Crawfurd GCB
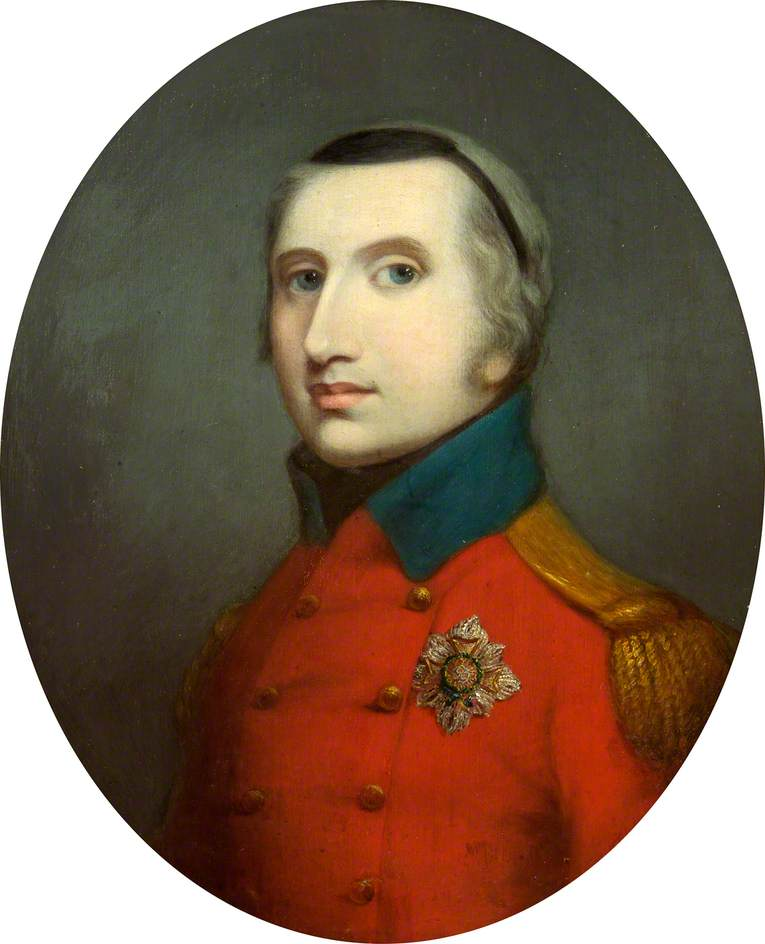
- Portrait of Craufurd, c. 1807

Member of Parliament for East Retford
- In office 1806–1812 Serving with Thomas Hughan, Sir William Ingilby, Bt
- Preceded by: Robert Crauford; John Jaffray
- Succeeded by: George Osbaldeston; Charles Marsh

Personal details
- Born: Charles Gregan Craufurd; 12 February 1763 Golden Square, London
- Died: 26 March 1821 (aged 58)
- Spouse(s): Anna Mary, Duchess of Newcastle (m. 1800; died 1821)
- Relations: Robert Craufurd (brother)
- Parent(s): Sir Alexander Craufurd, 1st Baronet; Jane Crokatt

Lieutenant-General Sir Charles Gregan Craufurd GCB (12 February 1763 – 2 April 1821) was a British soldier.

== Early life ==
He was born in Golden Square, London, the second son of Sir Alexander Crauford of Kilbirnie, 1st Baronet and his wife, Jane Crokatt. He was the younger brother of Sir James Craufurd of Kilbirnie, 2nd Baronet and the elder brother of Robert Craufurd.

== Career ==
Craufurd entered the 1st Dragoon Guards as a cornet on 15 December 1778. Promoted a lieutenant in 1781, he was raised to the rank of captain in the 2nd Dragoon Guards (Queen's Bays) in 1785. He became the equerry and intimate friend of the Duke of York. He studied in Germany for some time, and, with his brother Robert's assistance, translated Tielke's book on the Seven Years' War (The Remarkable Events of the War between Prussia, Austria and Russia from 1756 to 1763). As aide-de-camp he accompanied the Duke of York to the French War on the Netherlands in May 1793 attached to the Austrian HQ's commander-in-chief. He was at once sent as commissioner to the Austrian headquarters, with which he was present at Neerwinden, Caesar's Camp, Famars, Landrecies, etc.

Promoted to major in May 1793, and lieutenant-colonel in February 1794, he returned to the British Army in the latter year to become deputy assistant adjutant-general. At the Battle of Villers-en-Cauchies he distinguished himself at the head of a charge of two squadrons, capturing three guns and taking 1,000 prisoners. When the British army left the continent, Craufurd was again attached to the Austrian Army, and was present at the actions on the Lahn, the combat of Neumarket, and the Amberg. At the last battle a severe wound rendered him incapable of further service, and cut short a promising career. He was invalided out to England. There he did all he could to advance his brother, Robert's career. Promoted colonel on 26 January 1797, he was already in charge of a brigade-major. On 23 September 1803 he was promoted to major-general.

Charles Craufurd was already an MP when appointed colonel of 2nd Dragoon Guards. He was made a Lieutenant-General in 1810. He succeeded his brother Robert as Member of Parliament (MP) for East Retford (1806–1812). Craufurd was a Tory in politics, friend of Lord Londonderry. He was made GCB on 27 May 1820

== Personal life ==
On 7 February 1800 he was married Anna Maria, Duchess of Newcastle (c. 1760–1834) (née Lady Anna Maria Stanhope). The widow of Thomas Pelham-Clinton, 3rd Duke of Newcastle, she was a daughter of William Stanhope, 2nd Earl of Harrington and Lady Caroline Fitzroy (a daughter of the 2nd Duke of Grafton). Her son, Henry Pelham-Clinton, the 4th Duke was a minor. His brother Robert got married on the same day.

He died on 2 April 1821 and was buried at Bothamsall. His widow, by then referred to as Lady Craufurd, died on 18 October 1834.

== Bibliography ==
- Tielke, Johann Gottlieb. An account of some of the most remarkable events of the war between the Prussians, Austrians and Russians, from 1756 to 1763: and a treatise on several branches of the military art, with plans and maps. Translated from the second edition of the German original of J. G. Tielke, by Captain C. Craufurd, ... and Captain R. Craufurd.
- Craufurd MA, Alexander H. General Craufurd and his Light Division with many anecdotes, a paper and letters by Sir John Moore, and also letters from the Right Hon. W Windham, the Duke of Welington, Lord Londonderry, and others. Griffith Farran Okeden & Welsh.
- Leigh Rayment's Historical List of MPs

Parliament of the United Kingdom
| Preceded by Robert Crauford; John Jaffray | Member of Parliament for East Retford; 1806–1812; With: Thomas Hughan 1806–1807; Sir William Ingilby, Bt 1807–1812 | Succeeded by George Osbaldeston; Charles Marsh |
Military offices
| Preceded by The Marquess Townshend | Colonel of the 2nd Dragoon Guards (Queen's Bays); 1807–1821 | Succeeded by William Loftus |
