= Ingleby baronets of Ripley Castle (1642) =

Escutcheon of the Ingleby baronets of Ripley Castle

The Ingleby baronetcy, of Ripley Castle in the County of York, was created in the Baronetage of England on 17 May 1642 for William Ingleby. He was the son of Sampson Ingleby of Spofforth, steward to the Earl of Northumberland; and grandson of Sir William Ingleby (died 1579). He was a Royalist soldier who fought at the Battle of Marston Moor.

The title became extinct on the death of the 4th Baronet in 1772.

== Ingleby baronets, of Ripley Castle (1642) ==
- Sir William Ingleby, 1st Baronet (c. 1603–1652)
- Sir William Ingleby, 2nd Baronet (1621–1682)
- Sir John Ingleby, 3rd Baronet (1664–1742)
- Sir John Ingleby, 4th Baronet (c. 1705 – 1772)
