= William Amcotts-Ingilby =

British politician

- caricature of Amcotts-Ingilby entitled "The Lincolnshire crater sans laver"
- Born: 20 June 1783
- Died: 14 May 1854
- Occupation: Politician
- Father: John Ingilby

Sir William Amcotts-Ingilby, 2nd Baronet (June 1783 – 14 May 1854) was a British politician.

The son of Sir John Ingilby, 1st Baronet and his wife Elizabeth Amcotts, he entered the House of Commons as Member of Parliament (MP) for East Retford in 1807. In the same year, he succeeded his maternal grandfather, Sir Wharton Amcotts, 1st Baronet, in his baronetcy by special remainder.

Ingilby left Parliament in 1812, and succeeded his father as baronet in 1815, inheriting Ripley Castle in Yorkshire and Kettlethorpe Hall in Lincolnshire. He served as High Sheriff of Yorkshire in 1821, and assumed the surname of Amcotts-Ingilby in 1822. He returned to Parliament at an 1823 by-election, as MP for Lincolnshire. He held that seat until the abolition of the constituency in 1832, and he then sat for North Lincolnshire until defeated in the 1835 election.

Amcotts-Ingilby, a very eccentric character, married twice, but never had children; his baronetcies became extinct upon his death on 14 May 1854, at 23 Abingdon St, Westminster. His second marriage was to Mary Anne Clementson, daughter of John Clementson, and Lady Ingilby died after almost 50 years his widow at Broxholme, Ripley, Yorkshire, in her 85th year, on 22 December 1902. His estates were left by devise to his first cousin, Henry John Ingilby, who had been made 1st Baronet Ingilby, of Ripley Castle and Harrington, in 1866. His sister, Augusta Amcotts-Ingilby, was the mother of Weston Cracroft Amcotts.

Parliament of the United Kingdom
Preceded by Thomas Hughan; Charles Craufurd	Member of Parliament for East Retford; 1807–1812; With: Charles Craufurd	Succeeded by George Osbaldeston; Charles Marsh
Preceded by Charles Anderson-Pelham; Charles Chaplin	Member of Parliament for Lincolnshire; 1823–1832; With: Charles Chaplin 1823–1831; Charles Anderson Worsley Pelham 1831–1832	Constituency abolished
New constituency	Member of Parliament for North Lincolnshire; 1832–1835; With: Charles Anderson Worsley Pelham	Succeeded by Charles Anderson Worsley Pelham; Thomas George Corbett
Honorary titles
Preceded by Henry Vansittart	High Sheriff of Yorkshire; 1821	Succeeded by Richard Bethell
Baronetage of Great Britain
Preceded by John Ingilby	Baronet (of Ripley Castle); 1815–1854	Extinct
Preceded by Wharton Amcotts	Baronet (of Kettlethorpe Park); 1807–1854	Extinct
