= Spofforth Castle =

Castle in Spofforth, North Yorkshire, England

- Spofforth, North Yorkshire, England
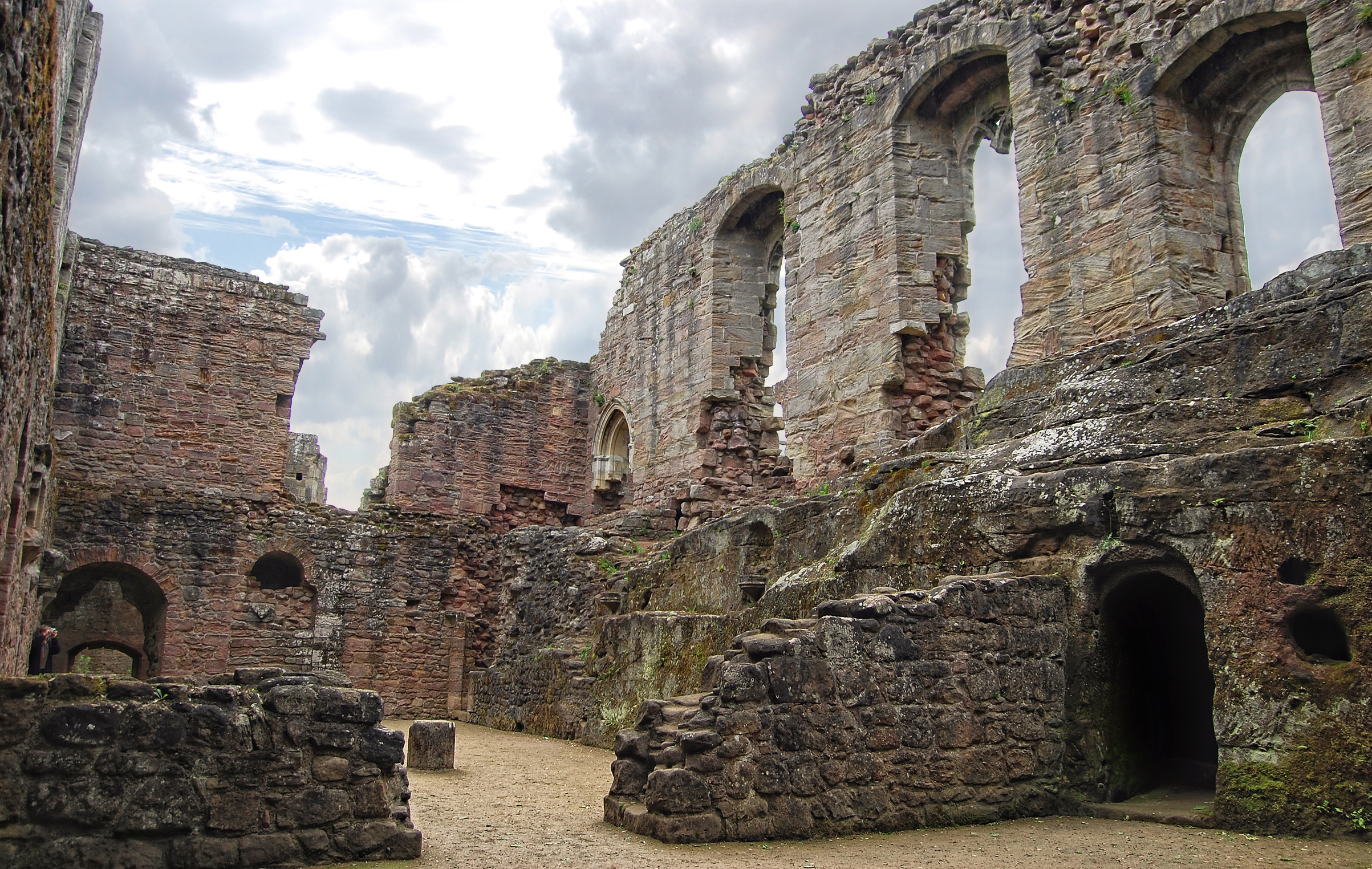
- Spofforth Castle; built partially into the bedrock of the land which supports it

Site information
- Owner: English Heritage
- Open to the public: Yes

Location
- Shown within North Yorkshire
- Location within North Yorkshire
- Coordinates: 53.9538°N 1.4468°W
- Grid reference: grid reference SE364510

Site history
- Materials: Stone
- Events: English Civil War

Spofforth Castle, in the village of Spofforth, North Yorkshire, England, was a fortified manor house ruined during the English Civil War, and now run by English Heritage as a tourist attraction.

== Description ==
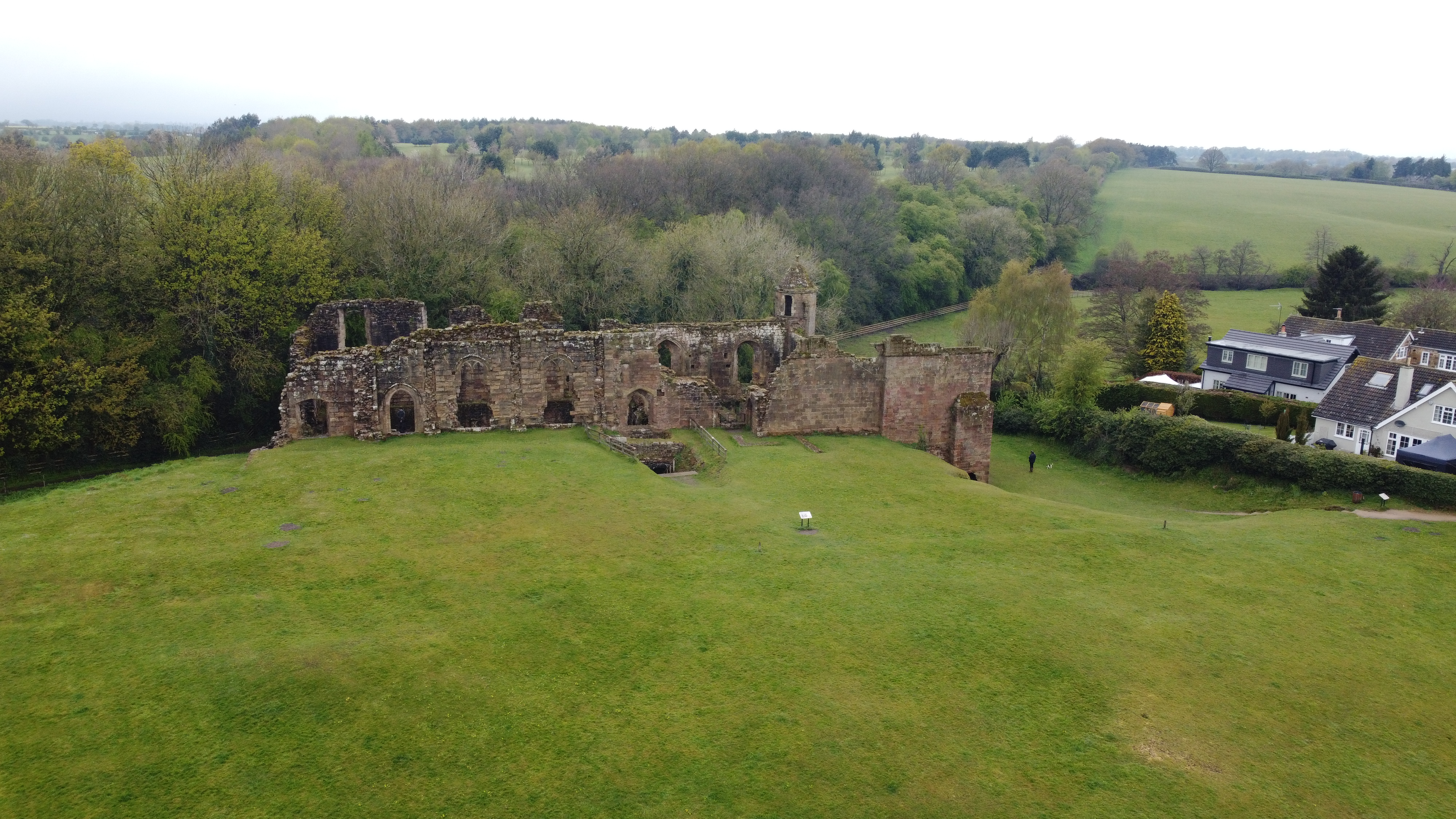
Aerial view of Spofforth Castle in North Yorkshire

Spofforth Castle was built by Henry de Percy in the early 14th century when he was given a licence to crenellate a manor house on the site, with later alterations made in the 14th and 15th centuries. The hall-tower of the castle is all that remains of the ruins. The eastern wall of the hall was built largely upon rock foundations. The extant 13th-century structure consist of a ground-floor undercroft, which has a rock face forming its eastern wall due to its elevation. Two staircases remain on the eastern wall, cut into the rock and leading to the lobby area of the hall. There is a two-storey chamber section on the north side of the tower, which has a polygonal stair turret to its northwest corner. The upper storey is of 15th-century construction and is probably a restoration.

== History ==
The terms of the Magna Carta are said to have been drawn up at Spofforth Castle.

The Percy estates, including Spofforth, were confiscated after the rebellion against King Henry IV in 1408 and given to Sir Thomas Rokeby. They were later restored and then lost again in 1461 when the Percys supported the losing side in the War of the Roses. Spofforth was eventually returned to the family and remained inhabited by their steward, Sampson Ingleby, the father of Sir William and Jane Ingleby, until 1604. The castle was reduced to ruins during the English Civil War of 1642–1646.

The castle was given to the Office of Works in 1924 by the 3rd Baron Leconfield. The ruins, primarily the west side oPercef the original castle, are now listed as a grade II* listed building and under the guardianship of English Heritage as a tourist attraction. They are managed by Spofforth-with-Stockeld Parish Council.

In 1985 the people of Spofforth bought Castle Field for the lasting benefit of the community.

The current Lord of Spofforth Castle is Mark McClelland-Jones, a direct descendant of Henry de Percy, 1st Baron Percy.

== See also ==
- Castles in Great Britain and Ireland
- List of castles in England
- Grade II* listed buildings in North Yorkshire (district)
- Listed buildings in Spofforth with Stockeld

== Bibliography ==
- Pettifer, Adrian (2002). English Castles: A Guide by Counties. Woodbridge, UK: Boydell Press. ISBN 9780851157825.
