= Emma Ingilby =

English aristocrat and businesswoman

Lady Ingilby
- Born: Emma Clare Roebuck Thompson
- Occupations: Landowner, businesswoman
- Spouse: Sir Thomas Ingilby, 6th Baronet (m. 1984)
- Children: 5
- Parent(s): Richard A. Thompson; Pamela Margaret Baker
- Family: Ingilby (by marriage)

Emma Clare Roebuck Ingilby, Lady Ingilby (née; Thompson) is a British aristocrat and businesswoman. Upon her marriage to Sir Thomas Ingilby in 1984, she became the châtelaine of Ripley Castle, the seat of the Ingilby baronets. She co-owns and co-runs the estate alongside her husband, and opened the castle up to the public in the late 1980s. As of February 2025 she and her husband are selling the castle and estate in order to retire.

== Early life ==
Lady Ingilby is the daughter of Major Richard A. Thompson, a military officer, and Pamela Margaret Baker, a school teacher. Her parents met in Hong Kong, where her father was serving in the British Armed Forces, shortly after World War II. Her father's family are an old Quaker family of merchants from Yorkshire, and her grandparents were friends with the Terry and Rowntree families. She is a descendant of John Spicer, a Protestant martyr who was burnt at the stake in 1556 during the Marian persecutions and was listed in Foxe's Book of Martyrs.

She studied business at the University of Bristol. After finishing university, she worked as a personal assistant for a finance director.

== Ripley Castle ==
Lady Ingilby co-owns and co-manages Ripley Castle, a 14th-century estate, with her husband. The castle, the Ingilby family home for over 700 years, is in Ripley, North Yorkshire, near Harrogate. Shortly after they married, she and Sir Thomas decided to commercialise Ripley. The Harrogate Convention Centre had been built a few years before, and the Ingilbys opened up the castle for dinners and teas, and turned some of the estate's stables and outbuildings into shops, in order to pull in tourism from the convention centre. Ingilby manages the castle while her husband focuses on the property. They travel broadly to promote the castle, including locations as far as Australia. They gave commercial leases to an art gallery, a pub, cafés, a gin-tasting room, a small clothing boutique, and a florist in Ripley. Lady Ingilby originally cooked the meals for formal dinners and events at the castle, for sometimes up to a hundred guests. She once hosted Sophie, Countess of Wessex at the castle. She hosts weddings and other formal events at the castle, and opened a 25-room hotel, called the Boar's Head, in one of the estate's listed buildings. As part of her work, she has served as bartender or waitstaff. She also opened up the east wing of the castle as a conference and banqueting facility. When she began managing the estate, she employed 17 staff personnel and, by the 2000s, employed over 120 turning over 2 million pounds a year.

Lady Ingilby grows coffee, palms, bananas, oranges, cacti, and orchids in Ripley's gardens. In 2020, during the COVID-19 pandemic in the United Kingdom, she had to dismiss her gardening staff, and had to manage the 15 acres (6.1 ha) of gardens, and the village flowers, on her own.

In February 2021, she was interviewed by Emma Manners, Duchess of Rutland for the podcast Duchess, where she talked about her role at Ripley Castle.

In June 2024, it was announced that the castle and estate were to be put on the market, and she plans to retire. The price of the castle and estate has been set at £21 million.

== Personal life ==
She met Sir Thomas Colvin William Ingilby, 6th Baronet of Ripley Castle, at a dinner party when she was 18 years old. They married on 25 December 1984. Upon her marriage to Sir Thomas, she gained the title Lady Ingilby. She and her husband have five children.

Lady Ingilby is a member at York Racecourse. She serves as patron of Candlelighters, a foundation in Yorkshire that supports families with children battling cancer.
