= Royal Literary Fund =

Authors' fund based in London, England

- Abbreviation: RLF
- Formation: 1790; 236 years ago
- Type: Benevolent fund
- Headquarters: 3 Johnson's Court, London EC4A 3EA
- Chief executive: Edward Kemp
- Patron: Queen Camilla
- Website: www.rlf.org.uk

The Royal Literary Fund (RLF) is a benevolent fund that gives assistance to published British writers in financial difficulties. Founded in 1790, and granted a royal charter in 1818, the Fund has helped an extensive roll of authors through its long history, from the most famous to the most obscure, whose cases are judged to be deserving. It also operates a Fellowship scheme, placing established writers in universities to encourage writing skills, and to monitor standards of writing in the higher education world.

== History ==
The Fund was founded in 1790 by Reverend David Williams, who was inspired to set up the Fund by the death in debtors' prison of a translator of Plato's dialogues, Floyer Sydenham. Ever since then, the charity has received bequests and donations, including royal patronage. In 1818 the Fund was granted a royal charter, and was permitted to add "Royal" to its title in 1845.

The Royal Literary Fund has given assistance to many distinguished writers over its history, including Samuel Taylor Coleridge, Samuel Rousseau, François-René de Chateaubriand, Thomas Love Peacock, Colin Mackenzie, James Hogg, Leigh Hunt, Thomas Hood, Richard Jefferies, Joseph Conrad, D. H. Lawrence, James Joyce, Ivy Compton-Burnett, Richard Ryan (biographer), Regina Maria Roche and Mervyn Peake. It also helped very many more struggling authors like Anne Burke who found themselves in dire poverty and/or poor health in the period before social security, through small grants. The fund has also helped authors who have faced poverty in later life, such as Mary Catherine Rowsell who got four grants from the fund.

Throughout the nineteenth century and until 1939 much of the charity's money came from an annual fund-raising dinner at which major public and literary figures (including Gladstone, Lord Palmerston, Dr Livingstone, Stanley Baldwin, Charles Dickens, Thackeray, Robert Browning, J. M. Barrie and Rudyard Kipling) exhorted guests to make generous donations. Current funds include the income from these earlier investments and from royalties bequeathed by writers. Among the estates from which the Fund earns royalties are those of the First World War poet Rupert Brooke, the novelists Somerset Maugham and G. K. Chesterton and children's writers Arthur Ransome and A. A. Milne.

The RLF's chief executive is Edward Kemp, and in 2024 Queen Camilla was announced as the new royal patron.

== Fellowship scheme ==
Income from the A. A. Milne estate has enabled the RLF to establish a Fellowship Scheme to place professional writers in universities in the UK. The Fellowship Scheme was established in 1999 under the guidance of Hilary Spurling. It provides a stipend for established writers to work in universities and colleges to help students and staff to develop their writing skills, concentrating particularly on academic writing. Typically, these are one-to-one sessions. Writers employed include novelists, playwrights, poets, translators, writers of non-fiction and of children's books. By the end of 2006, there were 77 Fellows in 47 institutions throughout the mainland UK.

The Fellowship Scheme also undertakes research into the state of writing among British students and school pupils and is proactive in promoting the development of writing skills. Between 2002 and 2005, a group of Project Fellowships existed to carry out research into how the work for the Fellowship could be furthered in the future.

== Sale of rights ==
=== Winnie the Pooh ===
In 2001, the RLF sold the rights of the character Winnie the Pooh, and others in the series, to Disney. The $350 million deal gave Disney full rights to the franchise until copyright expires in 2026. Winnie the Pooh author A. A. Milne had sold the rights to the RLF. The RLF gained about $132 million from the deal.

Disney first acquired the rights to the characters in the 1960s and paid twice-yearly royalties to the RLF and other beneficiaries.
