= Charles Marsh (barrister) =

British politician and barrister

Charles Marsh (1774?–1835) was an English barrister and politician.

== Life ==
Born about 1774, he was a younger son of Edward Marsh, a Norwich manufacturer, and received his education at the Norwich School under Dr. Forster. On 5 October 1792 he was admitted pensioner of St John's College, Cambridge, but did not graduate. He became a student of Lincoln's Inn on 26 September 1791, was called to the bar, and in 1804 went to Madras, where he practised with success.

On his return to England Marsh was elected Member of Parliament for East Retford in the 1812 United Kingdom general election, thanks to some bare-faced trickery in representing himself as the Whig candidate. On 1 July 1813 he spoke in a committee of the House of Commons in support of the amendment, moved by Sir Thomas Sutton, on the clause in the East India Bill providing further facilities for persons to go out to India for religious purposes. He denounced the attempts of William Wilberforce and others to make Christian converts in India. His speech was described as "one of the most pointed and vigorous philippics in any language" in the Quarterly Review.

Marsh did not seek re-election at East Retford 1818, contesting Sudbury unsuccessfully. He had money problems during the 1820s, and died in 1835.

== Works ==
Marsh was a contributor to The Cabinet. By a Society of Gentlemen, a Norwich periodical, published in volumes in 1795. He wrote also some pamphlets, including An Appeal to the Public Spirit of Great Britain, London, 1803, and A Review of some important Passages in the late Administration of Sir George Hilaro Barlow, Bart., at Madras, London, 1813. His speech on the East India Bill was printed in pamphlet form in 1813, and also in vol. ii. of The Pamphleteer (1813). He is also the reputed author of two volumes of gossip, The Clubs of London; with Anecdotes of their Members, Sketches of Character, and Conversations, London, 1828, although recent scholarship suggests that Scottish writer Colin Mackenzie may be the true author of this work. Some of the anecdotes had already appeared in the New Monthly Magazine, to which Marsh contributed.

The Letters of Vetus in The Times (1812) have been attributed incorrectly to Marsh. They were written by Edward Sterling.

== Notes ==
Attribution

This article incorporates text from a publication now in the public domain: Lee, Sidney, ed. (1893). "Marsh, Charles". Dictionary of National Biography. Vol. 36. London: Smith, Elder & Co.

Parliament of the United Kingdom
Preceded by William Amcotts-Ingilby; Charles Craufurd	Member of Parliament for 1812 – 1818; With: George Osbaldeston	Succeeded by William Evans; Samuel Crompton
