= Thomas Hughan =

Scottish slave trader, merchant and politician

Member of Parliament for Dundalk
- In office 25 July 1808 – 29 October 1811
- Preceded by: Patrick Bruce
- Succeeded by: Frederick Trench

Member of Parliament for East Retford
- In office 1806–1807 Serving with Charles Craufurd
- Preceded by: John Jaffray; Robert Craufurd
- Succeeded by: William Ingilby; Charles Craufurd

Personal details
- Born: 1760 Kirkmabreck, Kirkcudbright
- Died: 29 October 1811 (aged 50–51) Hampstead, London
- Spouse: Jean Milligan (m. 1810; died 1811)
- Children: 3
- Relatives: Janetta Manners, Duchess of Rutland (granddaughter); Sir Arthur Henniker-Hughan (great-grandson)
- Occupation: Slave trader, politician

Thomas Hughan (c. 1760 – 29 October 1811) was a Scottish slave trader, merchant and politician affiliated with the West India Dock Company.

== Early life ==
Hughan was born c. 1760 in Burns, Kirkmabreck, Kirkcudbright. He was the eldest son of Margaret (née Gerran) Hughan and Alexander Hughan, a merchant from Creetown. He had one brother, Alexander Hughan, who died 30 March 1810. His sister, Jane Hughan, married James Dalzell of Armagh.

== Career ==
During the late 18th century, Hughan spent 12 years in Jamaica working for the slave-trading West India Dock Company, returning to London around 1797. He continued working for the Company and was promoted to Director in 1803, and to Deputy Chairman in 1805. He also served as founding member and Director of the Imperial Fire Insurance Company.

Hughan served as a Member of Parliament twice, for the constituency of East Retford from 1806 to 1807, and for Dundalk from 25 July 1808 to 29 October 1811. On 27 February 1807, he used his maiden speech in the House of Commons to protest against the proposed abolition of the slave trade, stating that the bill was "fraught with ruin to the colonies and to the Empire", and that "there did not exist a more happy race than the slaves in our colonies". He voted against the bill twice but failed to defeat it, the bill passing into law as the Slave Trade Act 1807, which formally prohibited the slave trade in the British Empire. (Slavery itself was not abolished until the Slavery Abolition Act 1833).

In 1810, Hughan was called before the Bullion Committee to answer questions regarding the bullion supply in Jamaica and the excessive dividend payments of the West India Dock Company.

== Personal life ==
While residing in London, he lived at 8 Billiter Square and 12 Devonshire Place. His Scottish address was The Hill, Luetown, Galloway. On 1 February 1810, he married Jean Milligan, eldest daughter of Robert Milligan, the slave-owner and dock promoter in part responsible for the construction of the West India Docks. He had two illegitimate daughters and one son:

- Thomas Hughan (1811–1879), who married Lady Louisa Georgiana Beauclerk, younger daughter of William Beauclerk, 8th Duke of St Albans and his second wife, Maria Beauclerk, Duchess of St Albans.

Hughan died following a short illness at Hampstead, London, on 29 October 1811, two days before his son was born. Neither of his two illegitimate daughters, Jane Hughan and Margaret Hughan, had reached the age of twenty-one by the time of his death, so they were likely born in the West Indies. Margaret married James Spence, Esq. of Broughton Place, Edinburgh, in 1818.

=== Descendants ===
Through his son and heir Thomas of Airds House, Parton, Galloway, he was a grandfather of Janetta Hughan, who married John Manners, 7th Duke of Rutland; and Louisa Hughan, who married Sir Brydges Henniker, 4th Baronet (parents of Sir Arthur Henniker-Hughan, 6th Baronet, MP for Galloway).

Parliament of the United Kingdom
| Preceded by Patrick Bruce | Member of Parliament for Dundalk; 1808–1811 | Succeeded by Frederick Trench |
| Preceded by John Jaffray; Robert Craufurd | Member of Parliament for East Retford; 1806–1807; With: Charles Craufurd | Succeeded by William Ingilby; Charles Craufurd |
