= Charles Ingleby (cricketer) =

English cricketer (1870–1939)

Charles Willis Ingleby (11 December 1870 – 15 November 1939) was an English cricketer active from 1899 to 1901 who played for Lancashire. He was born in Leeds and died in Bradford. He appeared in one first-class match, scoring 40 runs with a highest score of 29.
