= Colin Mackenzie (writer) =

Colin Mackenzie (1795–1854) was a Scottish-born writer, book producer, editor, translator and compiler. Mackenzie spent his adult life living and working in London, England. He wrote/helped produce works of non-fiction, including educational and informative works on chemistry, cookery, medicine, popular science, geography, history, economics and religion, the "gentlemen's clubs" of London, a "parliamentary pocketbook" in 1832 (the year of the first Reform Act) and a report on poverty with a particular focus on London.

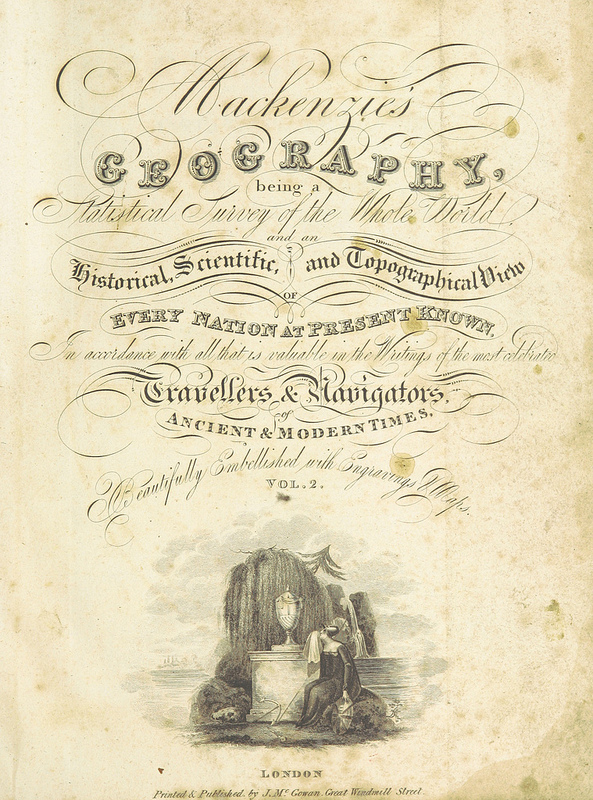
Mackenzies' Geography. Image taken from page 7 of The Geographical Encyclopedia; or a statistical survey of the world, etc Vol. 2, C. Mackenzie, London, J Mcgowan & sons, 1826

== Biography ==
Mackenzie was born in Edinburgh on 8 May 1795, eldest son of Edinburgh confectioner Alexander Mackenzie. "Bred to be a surgeon" as he described it later in life, his education was sponsored by John Rotherham and then Dr Macdonald of St Andrews University. He attended classes in Latin and Greek at Inverness Royal Academy between 1804 and 1809. Between 1810 and 1814 he studied for a Master of Arts degree at Kings College, Aberdeen University. In 1814 he moved to London, enrolling at Guy's and St Thomas's Hospitals to train as a surgeon, but abandoned his studies in 1815. He married regency Cheltenham actress Ann Moody in March 1817. Mackenzie and his wife had five children before Ann died in 1831. Mackenzie married again in 1846, and died in 1854.

== 1821–1823: One Thousand Experiments in Chemistry and Five Thousand Receipts ==
Mackenzie's two earliest works, One Thousand Experiments in Chemistry (1821) and Five Thousand Receipts in all the Useful and Domestic Arts (1823) were the most popular books he was associated with. The accuracy of the information in One Thousand Experiments in Chemistry and the practicality and safety of the experiments were called into question in some book reviews in the journals of the time but One Thousand Experiments in Chemistry proved to be a popular success all the same and was republished 22 times in the 1820s in Britain, Europe and America. Five Thousand Receipts (1823) was an even greater success. A household economy compendium, filled with general medical information, health tips and recipes (receipts an archaic word for recipes) for all kinds of concoctions, whether culinary, medicinal or for practical household needs, Five Thousand Receipts went through at least 26 editions between 1823 and 1864 and was particularly successful in America.

== Subsequent works, 1824–1838 ==
Other publications followed on a diverse range of topics, but none were as successful as the earliest works. Mackenzie's Royal Literary Fund applications indicate that he was the author of The Clubs of London (1828), a work that has been commonly ascribed to Charles Marsh. They include an 1848 letter from prominent publisher of the time Richard Bentley suggesting Mackenzie consider selling Bentley the copyright, and then together they could produce an updated version of the book, an offer Mackenzie rejected.

1832 saw the publication of A Key to Both Houses, an encyclopedic overview of the British Houses of Parliament, past and present, written on the eve of the 1832 Reform Act.

Mackenzie also contributed to the English edition of Mikhail Zagoskin's The Young Muscovite (1834). Although Frederic Chamier is credited with being the editor of this three volume work, scholars have noted that the British Library copy of the work has "written by Colin Mackenzie, Esq" inscribed on the title page in pencil and in his RLF applications Mackenzie claimed that he edited it in "conjunction" with Chamier.

Mackenzie spent two spells in Whitecross Street Debtors Prison between 1834 and 1838.

== National Philanthropic Association and later works, 1839–1853 ==
The decade after the 1838 publication of The British Museum was a barren one for Mackenzie in terms of new publications, but he did become involved in a series of business ventures. In 1844 his attempts to launch a British and Irish Sunflower Company, which would make a profit by selling sun flower seeds and promoting the use of sun flower oil in street lighting ventures and elsewhere, was greeted with derision in The Times and The Morning Post.

In 1846 Mackenzie married Susanna Hughes (1808-1881). The marriage had broken down by 1848 and in 1849 Mackenzie presented a petition to the House of Commons, asking for the short term reintroduction of the "whipping post" and "ducking stool" for "undutiful and runaway wives" whilst a parliamentary inquiry looked into "the baleful influence of...marriage settlements." The petition was not taken seriously, with an M.P. for South Devon, calling it "ridiculous", "absurd" and "most unbecoming." By early 1851 Mackenzie and his wife were living together again in Mayfair.

In 1849 Mackenzie became secretary of Charles Cochrane's National Philanthropic Association. Mackenzie's work included writing and compiling A Plea for the Very Poor, on the plight of the "very poor" in the aftermath of the "hungry forties" in London, also including reports of the Highland Potato Famine and the Great Famine in Ireland.

In 1850 Mackenzie led a campaign for the memorial to Prince Aldolphus, Duke of Cambridge - recently deceased philanthropist and uncle of Queen Victoria - to be a series of soup kitchens around London for the destitute. The National Philanthropic Association was running a single soup kitchen at Leicester Square in central London at this point. The plan was controversial, heavily criticised in the columns of The Times newspaper, and didn't succeed.

In 1851 Henry Mayhew described Colin Mackenzie as "enlightened and kindly" in London Labour and the London Poor.

In 1853, a year before his death, while Mackenzie was living at 69 Dean Street, Soho, he wrote a letter, giving his address as the "British Library", concerning his plan to develop "a Banking and Financial System which...will shortly become acceptable and convenient to every Trading individual in this and other Countries."

== Publications ==
- Colin Mackenzie, One Thousand Experiments in Chemistry, Sir Richard Phillips and Co, London, 1821.
- Colin Mackenzie, Five thousand receipts in all the useful and domestic arts: constituting a complete and universal practical library and operative cyclopaedia, Sir Richard Phillips and Co, 1823.
- The British Perfumer by Charles Lillie, edited by Colin Mackenzie, Published by J. Souter, London, 1822.
- The Holy Inquisition by Phillipus Von Limborch [1692], Modernised, enlarged and remodeled by C. Mackenzie, Published by W. Cole, London, 1825.
- Colin Mackenzie, The Religious Rites and Ceremonies of Every Nation in the World: Impartially described and beautifully Illustrated with Engravings on Steel & Wood. Modernized from the Celebrated & Splendid Work of Bernard Picart. London: John Williams, 1826.
- Colin Mackenzie, The Geographical Encyclopedia; or a statistical survey of the world, etc, Vols 1 & 2, London, J Mcgowan & sons, 1826.
- The Clubs of London (Volumes 1 & 2), H. Colburn, 1828.
- Proverbs of Solomon, Colin Mackenzie, Souter, London, 1829.
- A Key to Both Houses of Parliament, Longman, Rees, Orme, Brown, Green and Longman, London, 1832.
- The Young Muscovite, or The poles in Russia, by M N Zagoskin edited by Frederic Chamier, London: Cochrane and M'crone, 1834.
- C Mackenzie, The British Museum: A [weekly] Cyclopaedia of Physical Science, Arts, and Literature : Comprising an Account of the Antiquities of the British Museum, and Interesting Articles on Astronomy, Meteorology, Geology etc, R Groombridge, 1838.
- A Plea for the Very Poor, London, James Nisbet & Co., 1850. This was commissioned by Charles Cochrane and the NPA. Mackenzie claims authorship for A Plea for the Very Poor in his 1851 "Insolvent Debtors Court" case.
