= Sir William Ingleby, 1st Baronet =

William Ingleby or Ingliby (c. 1594– 22 January 1652) was an English landowner.

== Career ==
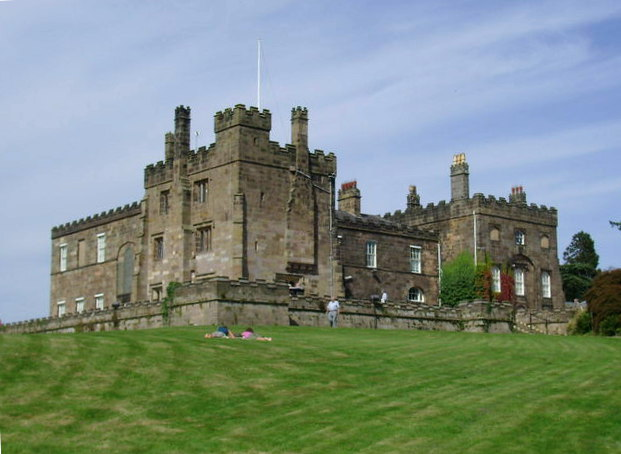
Ripley Castle

He was the son of Sampson Ingleby (died 1604), a steward of the Earl of Northumberland, and his wife Jane Lambert from Killinghall. They lived at Spofforth Castle in North Yorkshire. William Ingleby had a brother and five sisters.

Ingleby inherited Ripley Castle and its lands when his uncle, Sir William Ingleby, died in January 1618. He was made a baronet on 17 May 1642 by Charles I.

Ingleby was a Royalist and fought at the battle of Marston Moor. Oliver Cromwell is said to have come to Ripley Castle after the battle. William Ingleby was away or in hiding. His sister, Jane Ingleby, refused entrance to the Parliamentarians, but agreed to speak with Cromwell in a drawing room. In some versions of the story, she held Cromwell at gunpoint in the library.

William Ingleby died in 1652.

== Marriage and children ==
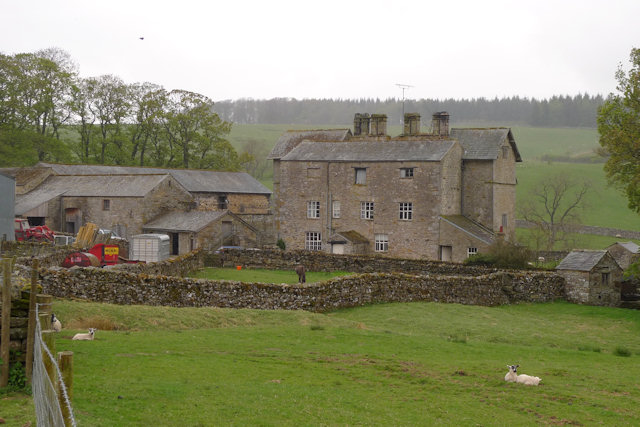
Anne Ingleby was brought up at Gaythorne Hall, near Great Asby, a home of the Bellingham family

Ingleby married Anne Bellingham. Her father, Sir James Bellingham of Helsington and Levens (died 1641), had been knighted by James VI and I in 1603. Her mother Anne or Agnes was a daughter of Henry Curwen of Workington. Their children included:

- Agnes Ingleby (died young)
- John Ingleby (died young)
- Sampson Ingleby (1629-1630)
- Sir William Ingleby (1621-1682), married Margret Savile, eldest daughter of John Savile (died 1651) of Methley, son of Sir John Savile (1546-1607).
- Henry Ingleby (1634)
