= George Osbaldeston =

British politician (1786–1866)

Squire Osbaldeston
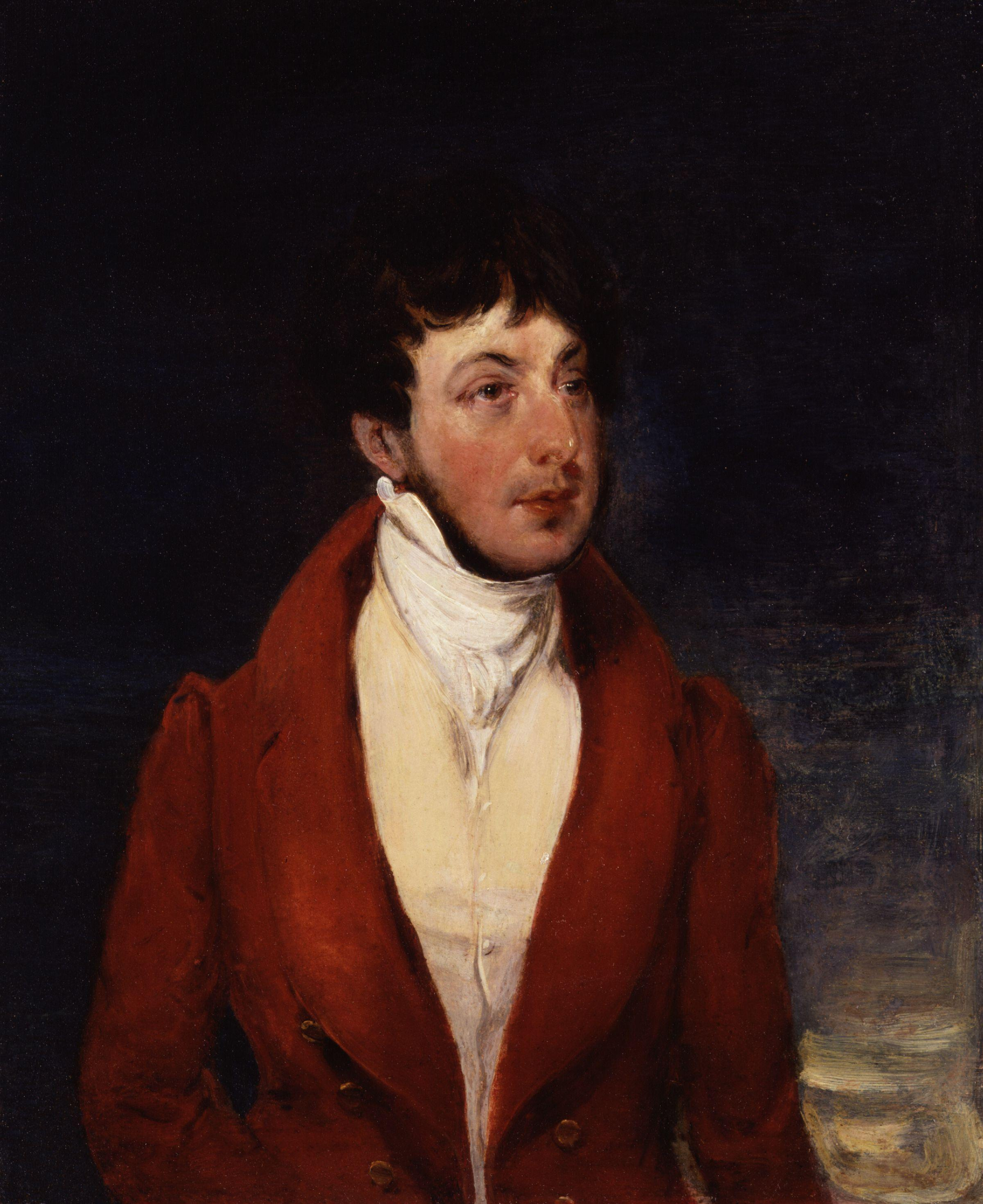
- George Osbaldeston, attributed to Francis Grant, c. 1825–1835

Member of Parliament for East Retford
- In office 1812–1818
- Preceded by: William Ingilby
- Succeeded by: William Evans; Samuel Crompton

High Sheriff of Yorkshire
- In office 1829–1830
- Preceded by: Sir Tatton Sykes, 4th Baronet
- Succeeded by: Edward Robert Petre

Personal details
- Born: 26 December 1786 Westminster, London
- Died: 1 August 1866 (aged 79) St John's Wood, London
- Party: Whig
- Spouse: Elizabeth Williams (m. 1851)
- Children: George Osbaldeston Green (b. c. 1812)

George Osbaldeston (26 December 1786 – 1 August 1866), best known as Squire Osbaldeston, was an English politician who served as a Member of Parliament but who had his greatest impact as a sportsman and cricketer.

== Early life ==
He was born 26 December 1786 in Westminster, London, and named for his father, George Osbaldeston, a member of parliament for Scarborough. His father, born George Wickins, inherited the Hutton Buscel estates from his uncle Fountayne Wentworth Osbaldeston and adopted his name. Squire's mother, Jane, was the daughter of Sir Thomas Head of Langley Hall, Berkshire.

Osbaldeston spent his childhood at Hutton Buscel, the family estate in Yorkshire. His father died in 1793; from age 6, George and his three sisters were brought up by their mother, who despite being a great political hostess, was wildly extravagant and squandered much of his inheritance. He spent most of his life trying to recover from this poverty, mainly by trying to win bets and sporting competitions.

== Education ==
He was educated at Eton from 1802 until 1803, when he was expelled. Thereafter he studied at Brighton (1803–04), where his behaviour was little improved. He matriculated at Brasenose College, Oxford in 1805. The combination of his absolute avoidance of academic work (even by the standards of the day) and his rowdy behaviour (including incidents such as pouring hot gravy over the head of a fellow student he disliked during hall) meant that he narrowly avoided being sent down. Ultimately, he left Oxford without a degree in 1807. On the other hand, during his student days he excelled in all sports, setting a pattern for the rest of his life.

== Politics ==
From 1809 to 1811 he was lieutenant-colonel of the 5th North York Local Militia.

In 1812, under pressure from his mother and the local aristocrat and Whig power-broker William Fitzwilliam, 4th Earl Fitzwilliam, Osbaldeston stood as a Whig parliamentary candidate for East Retford. He won one of the two seats, despite the machinations of his agent, who, claiming he had not been paid his fees, accused his own candidate of electoral malpractice, resulting in a trial. He had little interest in politics, and rarely attended the House. In his autobiography, Osbaldeston wrote that:

"There was a general election and my mother, in her political enthusiasm persuaded me to stand. I did so much against my inclination and was returned, but not without paying dearly for the distinguished honour, as it is deemed. I did not consider it an honour at all; I thought it a great bore... I was so entirely engrossed with hunting, shooting and athletic feats that I could not turn my thoughts to politics, and it was only in response to my mother’s entreaties that I attended the House on urgent occasions."

At the next election, 1818, he resigned. In 1829 he was made High Sheriff of Yorkshire.

== Sport ==
Osbaldeston excelled at sport, and rowed at his various schools, at Oxford and into middle age. He was particularly famous for his racing abilities, in flat, steeplechase, endurance and carriage races. In 1826, he won a celebrated steeplechase for a purse of 1,000 guineas on his horse, Clasher, against Dick Christian riding Clinker, a horse owned by Horatio Ross. On one occasion, in 1831 at Newmarket, he rode 200 miles (320 km) in 8 hours and 42 minutes, using 28 horses. On another occasion he wagered 100 guineas with Paul Methuen that he could drive a stage-coach from St. Paul's churchyard to Greenwich in an hour with a full complement of passengers. Osbaldeston won his bet, although the coach was loaded with a number of hefty Life-Guardsmen and despite being sent back from the bottom of Ludgate Hill for a false start. His last race was at the age of 69, and he also bred racehorses.

A noted shot at the Old Hat and Red House clubs, Osbaldeston there used a gun with a bore of 1½ inches. Sir Richard Sutton recorded that he once shot 98 pheasants with 100 shots. He brought his marksmanship to the track; on one occasion, when the notorious gambler Lord George Bentinck fired his pistol in the air while watching a race, Osbaldeston responded by shooting Bentinck cleanly through the hat as a warning.

In cricket, he was a fine all-rounder who batted and bowled right-handed, his bowling style being fast underarm. An outstanding Single Wicket player, he was chiefly associated with Marylebone Cricket Club (MCC) but he also represented Surrey, Sussex and Hampshire. He played 34 important matches between 1808 and 1830 as an amateur. His highest score was 112 for M.C.C. v Middlesex in 1816, where Osbaldeston also scored 68 in the second innings. His record in important matches was 1002 runs at 18.21, 2 centuries, 43 wickets, 15 catches and 2 stumpings.

Above all though, his passion was fox hunting. He had his own pack of hounds from the age of 16, and was later master of nine hunts, notably the Atherstone (1815–17), the Quorn (1817–21, 1823–27), and the Pytchley (1827–34). He was regarded by contemporaries as one of the best sportsmen of his generation, and became something of a folk hero in later hunting circles.

An anecdote demonstrates the passion with which he pursued "the hunt":

"Just when, in 1809, the 24 year old fourth Lord Monson was warming to the task of keeping his pack of foxhounds amongst the best blood in the country, nature accounted for him. The gentlemen of Lincolnshire cast around for a new master and up turned one of those adventurous amateurs whose exploits with hounds and the ladies either break or make a hunt. George Osbaldeston was 25 and he soon fell out with everyone except the foxes which he pursued with great noise, energy, boastfulness, courage and determination, to the far corners of the country."

== Personal life ==
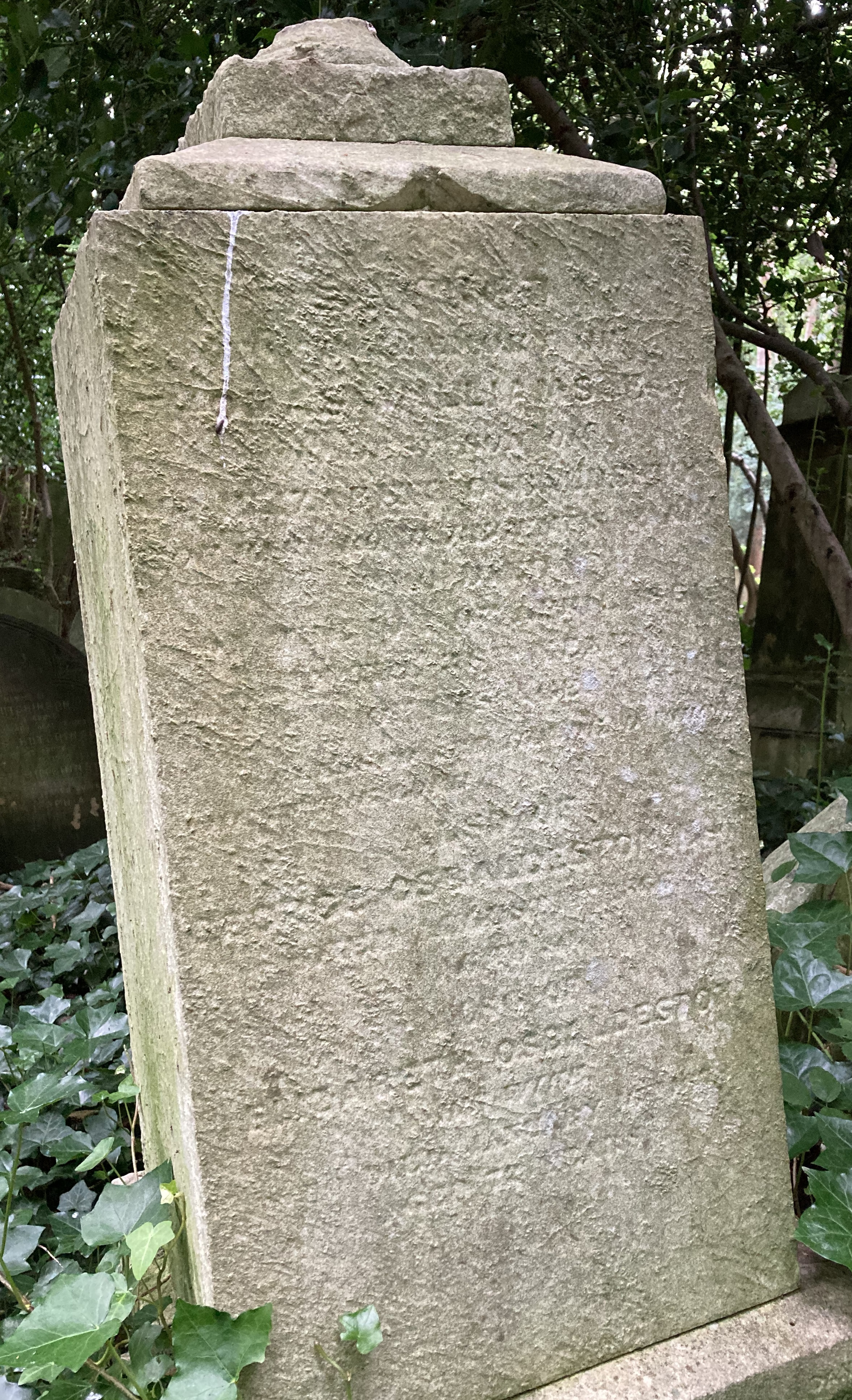
Grave of George Osbaldeston in Highgate Cemetery

The money he made from racing wins were overshadowed by gambling debts of around £200,000 (equivalent to £2,058,281 in 2025), which eventually forced him to sell his lands in 1848 and led to his dying almost penniless. His will states that he left effects to the value of under £100.

He was also known for his romantic escapades, such as attempting to seduce a friend of his mother's, Lady Monson (an unrequited love affair, despite his claims that she was the one woman he had really loved), staying at the house of a friend and seducing both his daughters on the same night, and leaving a ball for two hours to pick flowers from his garden for a lady there. He was rumoured to have a son by a Miss Green, a prostitute, whom he sent abroad. He finally married an Elizabeth Williams in 1851 at the age of 65, most likely as he was then able to live in her Regent's Park house.

His relationship with his mother, Jane, was ambivalent. In his autobiography he claims that: "a cleverer woman never existed, not a better mother." By all accounts Jane doted on her only son. On the other hand, he resented her extravagance, her misuse of his inheritance, and her attempts to force him to pursue a political career. Ultimately, he exiled her to a house in London which he had bought.

He had a great rivalry with his fellow cricketer Lord Frederick Beauclerk. In 1818 this resulted in Osbaldeston being barred for life from membership of MCC (after an intemperate resignation in disgust at the outcome of a single-wicket match and despite the attempted intercession of E. H. Budd); this event effectively finished Osbaldeston's career in historically important cricket. He also fought a duel with Lord George Bentinck, in the aftermath of a race of 1831, the outcome of which was disputed. Neither was hurt and they were later reconciled.

Of his brilliant beginning and impoverished end, his great friend and rival Horatio Ross commented, "He was open-hearted and trusted others; he was constantly deceived and robbed, and when his affairs were getting into confusion, he had not the moral nerve to pull up in time; nor had he a sufficiently business-head on his shoulders to guide him safely out of his troubles."

He died on 1 August 1866 in St John's Wood, London and was buried in the Williams family grave on the west team of Highgate Cemetery (plot no.11014).

== Descendants ==
In about 1812, Miss Ann Green of Lincoln (born about 1786) bore him a son, named George Osbaldeston Green. Mother and son were sent to Tasmania. George Green married a woman named Mary Ann Heastwood (b. Yorkshire 1819). Eventually George Osbaldeston Green and Mary Ann moved to the Gippsland area of Victoria. George was a butcher. They had 16 children, many of whom died in infancy or childhood; nevertheless ‘The Squire’ spawned quite a group of grandchildren. Their many descendants live mainly in Australia today. George Osbaldeston Green died in 1887 in Maffra, Victoria, and his wife Mary Ann died in 1908 in Heyfield, in the Gippsland region of Victoria.

Family historians report that Mary Ann Green was well-travelled and made some journeys to England, so whether there was contact maintained between "The Squire" and his Australian family is subject to speculation. Certainly their existence was known about, and recorded in Osbaldeston's autobiography.

Miss Green was described in George Osbaldeston's Autobiography as' a member of the frail sisterhood' (i.e., a prostitute). She was reputedly a natural (illegitimate) daughter of one of the Monson family. The boy was "sent abroad, has done well in the world, and is married with a family.". No record of either the birth or death of Miss Green has been found.

=== Children of George Osbaldeston Green and Mary Ann Heastwood: The Squire's grandchildren ===
- Mary Ann, born 1836 in Hobart Town, died 1926 in Sale, Victoria, married Robert Geddes
- George, born 1838 in Hobart Town, died 1868 in Gippsland, Victoria, married Dorothea Lenz of Germany
- Henry, born and died in 1840 in Hobart Town
- William George, born 1841 in Hobart Town, died 1864 in Hobart
- Charles Henry, born 1843 in Hobart Town, died 1932 in Heyfield Victoria, married Emily Ann Bennett
- Agnes Esther, born 1845 in Hobart Town, died 1938 in Moonee Ponds, Victoria, married Michael Campbell
- James, born 1846 in Hobart Town, died 1928 in Sale, Victoria
- Henrietta, born 1848 in Hobart Town, died 1917 in Glenmaggie, Victoria
- Emily Edith, born 1851 in Sale, Victoria, died 1866
- Martha Alice, born 1854, died 1866
- Amelia Jane, born 1856, died 1863
- Sophia Louisa, born 1858 in Sale, Victoria died 1860
- Anna Louisa, born 1859 in Sale, Victoria, died 1861 in Sale
- Frances Ada, born 1861 in Sale Victoria, died 1940 in Bairnsdale, Victoria married Charles John Marshall
- Laura Matilda, born 1863 in Sale Victoria, died 1949 in Warragul Victoria, married Thomas Collins
- Edward, born and died in 1866

== External sources ==
- ESPNCricInfo Profile

Parliament of the United Kingdom
Preceded by Charles Craufurd; William Ingilby	Member of Parliament for East Retford; 1812–1818; With: Charles Marsh	Succeeded by William Evans; Samuel Crompton
