= RLF (gene) =

Protein-coding gene in humans

Identifiers
- Aliases: RLF, ZN-15L, ZNF292L, rearranged L-myc fusion, RLF zinc finger
- External IDs: OMIM: 180610; MGI: 1924705; GeneCards: RLF

Gene location (Human)
Chr.	Chromosome 1 (human)
Band	1p34.2	Start	40,161,387 bp
Band	1p34.2	End	40,240,921 bp

Gene location (Mouse)
Chr.	Chromosome 4 (mouse)
Band	4|4 D2.2	Start	121,002,570 bp
Band	4|4 D2.2	End	121,072,281 bp
RNA expression pattern
Bgee	Human / Mouse (ortholog); Top expressed in: secondary oocyte; cartilage tissue; Achilles tendon; ventricular zone; sperm; endothelial cell; testicle; embryo; ganglionic eminence; middle temporal gyrus / Top expressed in: saccule; Rostral migratory stream; otic placode; granulocyte; otic vesicle; Gonadal ridge; tail of embryo; genital tubercle; lumbar spinal ganglion; hand; More reference expression data
BioGPS	n/a
Gene ontology
Molecular function	DNA binding; zinc ion binding; protein binding; metal ion binding; nucleic acid binding; DNA-binding transcription factor activity, RNA polymerase II-specific
Cellular component	nucleus
Biological process	positive regulation of transcription, DNA-templated; regulation of transcription, DNA-templated; DNA integration; chromosome organization; transcription, DNA-templated; positive regulation of transcription by RNA polymerase II; regulation of DNA methylation; histone H3-K4 monomethylation
Sources:Amigo / QuickGO
Orthologs
Databases	NCBI: entry; OMA: entry
Species	Human	Mouse
Entrez	6018	109263
Ensembl	ENSG00000117000	ENSMUSG00000049878
UniProt	Q13129	n/a
RefSeq (mRNA)	NM_012421	NM_001081013; NM_001346660
RefSeq (protein)	NP_036553	n/a
Location (UCSC)	Chr 1: 40.16 – 40.24 Mb	Chr 4: 121 – 121.07 Mb
PubMed search
- Wikidata
View/Edit Human	View/Edit Mouse

Zinc finger protein Rlf is a protein that in humans is encoded by the RLF gene.
