= John Ingilby =

British politician

Sir John Ingilby, 1st Baronet FRS (9 May 1758 – 13 May 1815) of Ripley Castle, Yorkshire was a British politician.

He was the illegitimate son of Sir John Ingilby, 4th Baronet by Mary Wright and educated at Emmanuel College, Cambridge.

He was created a Baronet in 1781 and appointed High Sheriff of Yorkshire for 1781–82. He was a Member (MP) of the Parliament of Great Britain for East Retford from 1790 until 1796. He was elected a Fellow of the Royal Society as Sir John Ingilby, Bart. of Ripley in Yorkshire and Princes Street, Hanover Square, London in 1793.

He married Elizabeth, the daughter and heiress of Sir Wharton Amcotts, 1st Baronet of Kettlethorpe, Lincolnshire. They had 11 children, of whom his sole surviving son succeeded him as Sir William Amcotts-Ingilby, 2nd Baronet.

Parliament of Great Britain
Preceded by Wharton Amcotts; Earl of Lincoln	Member of Parliament for East Retford; 1790–1796; With: Earl of Lincoln 1790–1794; William Henry Clinton 1794–1796	Succeeded by William Petrie; Sir Wharton Amcotts
Honorary titles
Preceded by Humphrey Osbaldeston	High Sheriff of Yorkshire; 1782	Succeeded by Sir Robert Hildyard
Baronetage of Great Britain
New creation	Baronet (of Ripley Castle); 1781–1815	Succeeded by William Amcotts-Ingilby
