= Sir Thomas Colvin William Ingilby, 6th Baronet =

English aristocrat and businessman

Sir Thomas Ingilby Bt
- Born: Thomas Colvin William Ingilby; 17 July 1955 (age 70)
- Occupation(s): Landowner, businessman
- Spouse: Emma Clare Roebuck Thompson (m. 1984)
- Children: 5
- Family: Ingilby

Sir Thomas Colvin William Ingilby, 6th Baronet (born 17 July 1955) is a British aristocrat, one of the Ingilby baronets. He lives at Ripley Castle. The family opened the castle to the public in the late 1980s.

== Early life ==
Ingilby was born on 17 July 1955 to Joslan William Vivian Ingilby, 5th Baronet and Diana née Colvin. He was educated at Eton College and the Royal Agricultural College, Cirencester.

He succeeded to the baronetcy on the death of his father in 1974.

== Ripley Castle ==
The castle, in Ripley, North Yorkshire, near Harrogate, has been the Ingilby family home for over 700 years.

In June 2024, it was announced that the castle and estate were to be put up for sale. It was put on the market with a guide price of £21 million.

== Personal life ==
He married Emma Clare Roebuck Thompson on 25 December 1984. They have five children.
