= John Ingleby (bishop) =

English nobleman, later a Cathusian monk and Bishop of Llandaff, Wales (1434–1499)

John Ingleby (1434–1499) was Bishop of Llandaff.

== Early life ==
Sir John was born on 7 July 1434, the only son of Sir William Ingleby of Ripley and Joan, daughter of Sir Brian Stapleton of Carlton. He inherited the Ripley estate from his father, Sir William Ingleby, when he was only five.

Sir John built the castle gatehouse at Ripley Castle and it is still there today, having been retained after the house was rebuilt.

== Family ==
Sir John married a wealthy heiress, Margery Strangways daughter of Sir James Strangways of Harlsey in Osmotherley, Yorkshire. They had a son and heir, William. Margery was regarded as a widow when he took holy orders. She spent eleven years raising her son before marrying Richard Welles, 7th Baron Welles. However, Edward IV reneged on a promise of safe keeping and had her husband beheaded in 1469, less than a year after their marriage.

== Monastic and ecclesiastical appointments ==
In 1457 John abandoned his wife and son as well as his estates and earthly possessions to become a monk at Mount Grace Priory. This was a Carthusian charterhouse that had been founded by his great-grandfather, John Ingleby near North Allerton. He was appointed prior of Sheen in 1477 and was the first visitor of the English province between 1478 and 1496. The royal family worshiped at Sheen and John became the first of three executors for Queen Elizabeth, wife of Edward IV in 1492. He was Henry VII’s special ambassador to Pope Innocent VIII. The king describing him as 'my captain and envoy' in one of the letters that John delivered to the Pope. Henry appointed him to oversee the conversion of the priory at Sheen into the royal palace of Richmond.

The Pope appointed John bishop of Llandaff on 27 June 1496. He was buried at the church of St Nicholas in Hertford.
