= Ripley Castle =

Country house in North Yorkshire, England

Coordinates: 54.0410°N 1.5680°W

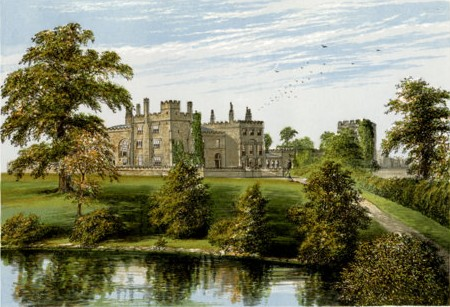
- Ripley Castle
- Interactive map of the Ripley Castle area

General information
- Location: Ripley, North Yorkshire, England
- Year built: 14th century
- Renovated: 1783–86
- Owner: Ingilby baronets

Technical details
- Material: Gritstone and ashlar; grey and stone slate
- Designations

Listed Building – Grade I
- Official name: Ripley Castle
- Designated: 8 March 1952
- Reference no.: 1315370

Website
- www.ripleycastle.co.uk

Ripley Castle is a Grade I listed 14th-century country house in Ripley, North Yorkshire, England, 3 miles (4.8 km) north of Harrogate.

The castle has been the seat of the Ingilby baronets for centuries. In June 2024 it was announced that it was to be sold.

== History ==
Sir Thomas Ingleby (c. 1290–1352) married the heiress Edeline Thwenge in 1308/9 and acquired the Ripley Castle estate with its medieval manor house as her dowry. His oldest son, also called Thomas (1310–1369), saved the king from being gored by a wild boar whilst on a hunting expedition and was knighted in return with the boar's head symbol as his crest.

His descendant Sir John Ingleby (1434–1499) inherited the estate at the age of five from his father William and built the castle gatehouse, before becoming a monk at Mount Grace Priory, near Northallerton, and later the Bishop of Llandaff. His son Sir William Ingleby was raised by his deserted mother. Sir John's grandson, Sir William Ingleby (1518–1578), was High Sheriff of Yorkshire in 1564–65. Sir William added the tower to the building in 1548. Two of his sons were fervent Catholics on the run from the authorities. Francis, a priest, was caught, sentenced and hanged, drawn and quartered in York in 1586; David escaped to die on the Continent. Stephen Proctor captured another priest, Christopher Wharton, in the park at Ripley in 1598. Wharton was executed at York.

Sir William Ingleby (1546–1618) was knighted by James VI of Scotland when the king was en route to his coronation as James I of England in 1603. Later that year he captured one of the fugitive brothers of the Earl of Gowrie at Kirkby Malzeard. In 1605 he was involved in the Gunpowder Plot, allowing the plotters to stay at Ripley whilst they procured horses. One of the conspirators, Robert Winter, was his nephew. Ingleby was arrested and charged with treason, but acquitted.

Sir William Ingleby (1594–1652) supported Charles I during the Civil War, and was made Baronet Ingleby in 1642. He fought at Marston Moor in 1644, when the King's forces were totally routed, making his escape to Ripley and hiding in a priest hole while Oliver Cromwell billeted himself there for the night, held at gunpoint in the library by Sir William's sister, Jane Ingleby. On the death of the 4th Baronet in 1772, the baronetcy became extinct but was revived in 1781 for his illegitimate son John (1758–1815).

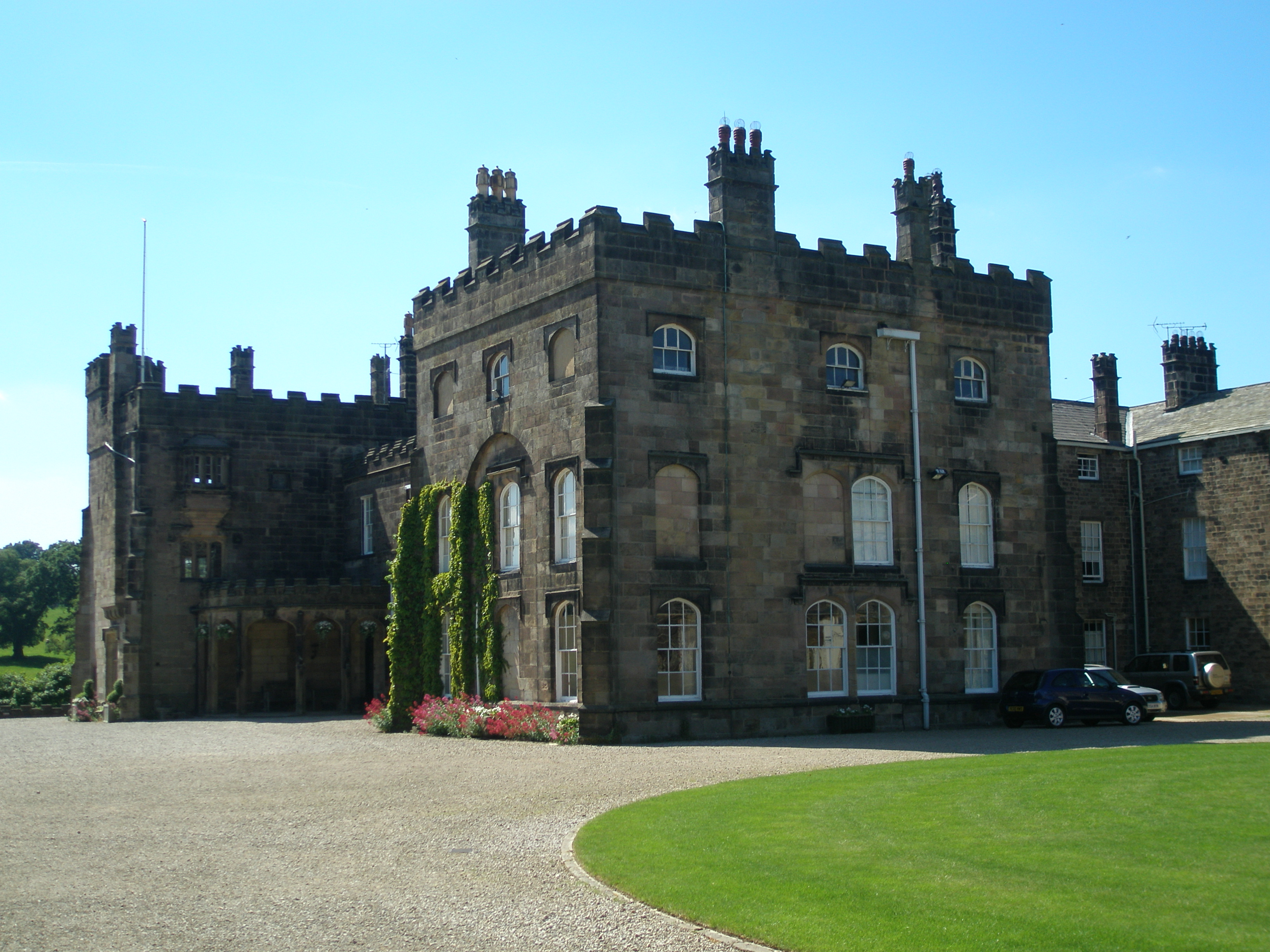
Ripley Castle in 2008

Sir John undertook a major rebuild of the castle in 1783–86 by William Belwood but got into debt and fled overseas in 1794 for several years. During this time the estate was managed by its long-serving steward, Ralph Robinson, who sold timber from the estate to raise money. Sir John was High Sheriff for 1782–83 and Member of Parliament (MP) for East Retford from 1790 to 1796. His son William (1783–1854) was a great eccentric, drinker and gambler and MP for East Retford from 1807 to 1812 and High Sheriff in 1821. He adopted the surname of Amcotts-Ingilby (his mother was Elizabeth Amcotts) and demolished and rebuilt the village of Ripley, complete with a Continental-style hôtel de ville. Having no heir he left the Ripley estate to his first cousin, Henry John Ingilby. The baronetcy was extinguished a second time.

Henry was created 1st Baronet Ingilby of the third creation in 1866. Ripley then descended to the present 6th Baronet.

The castle is still privately owned, now by the 6th Baronet, Sir Thomas Colvin William Ingilby. The gardens and grounds are open to the public, and guided tours of the castle were previously available, but as of February 2025 there are no longer any guided tours "Due to the upcoming sale of the Estate". The property was managed as an event venue by Emma Ingilby and Sir Thomas.

In October 2021, the castle was one of 142 sites across England to receive part of a £35-million injection from the government's Culture Recovery Fund.

In June 2024, it was announced that the castle and estate were to be put on the market in the autumn. It was put up for sale with a guide price of £21 million. As of November 2025, the asking price was £7.5 million.

== In popular culture ==
The Yorkshire Television children's series The Flaxton Boys (1969–1973) used Ripley Castle as the fictional Flaxton Hall.

It was used in the 1976 Disney film Escape from the Dark, as the home of Lord Harrogate, played by Alastair Sim.

The BBC Television series Gunpowder (2017) used the castle as a location.

In 2021 Ripley Castle featured in the Channel 5 television miniseries Anne Boleyn.

== Architecture ==
=== House ===
The house is built of coursed squared gritstone and ashlar with grey slate and stone slate roofs. A central two-storey block is flanked by a tower at one end and a three-storey wing at the other. The earliest part is the tower, with most of the rest of the buildings added between 1783 and 1786. The tower, at the southwest corner, has two storeys, and fronts of one and two bays. There are diagonal buttresses, a stair turret, and embattled parapets.

=== Brewhouse and laundry block, and dairy ===
The brewhouse and laundry block, and the dairy, are to the north of the house. Both buildings are grade II-listed and were built in about 1775.

The brewhouse and laundry block is constructed of gritstone with stone slate roofs. The central laundry block has two storeys and three bays, and a pyramidal roof with a louvred ventilator, and it contains a doorway, sash windows and fixed windows. The flanking wings have one storey, two bays and hipped roofs. Both wings contain doorways, the left wing has casement windows, and on the right wing the windows are sashes.

The dairy is built of gritstone and limestone with a stone slate roof. It has a single storey and 15 bays, the central bay projecting and containing a door and windows under a segmental arch, an eaves band, and a coped gable forming a pediment. The outer bays contain doorways and windows. At the rear is a central cambered archway flanked by narrower round arches with large voussoirs forming an open loggia.

=== Gatehouse ===
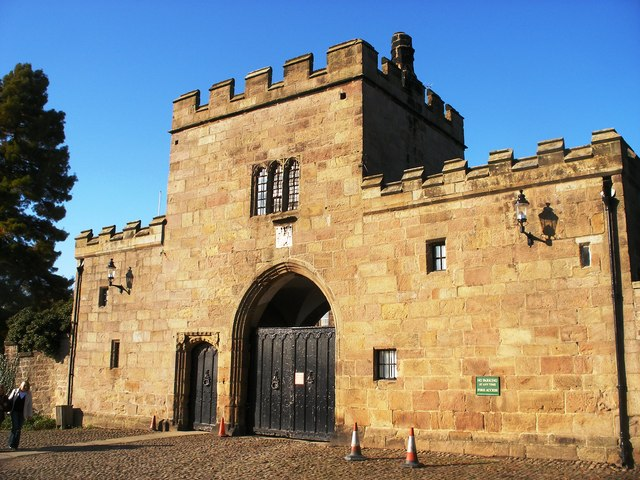
The gatehouse

The gatehouse, which stands some 80 metres (260 ft) to the south of the main buildings, is also grade I listed. It was built about 1450, and is constructed of stone on a plinth, with embattled parapets, the central bay with a lead roof, and the wings with grey slate roofs. The central bay has three storeys, and is flanked by lower two-storey bays. In the central bay is a tall pointed moulded arch, and to the left is a pedestrian entrance; both are decorated with ribs and trefoil arcading, and have boar's heads handles. Above the main arch is a limestone plaque with a coat of arms, and above that is a three-light window, the lights with cinquefoil heads. The outer bays contain single-light windows.

=== Orangery ===
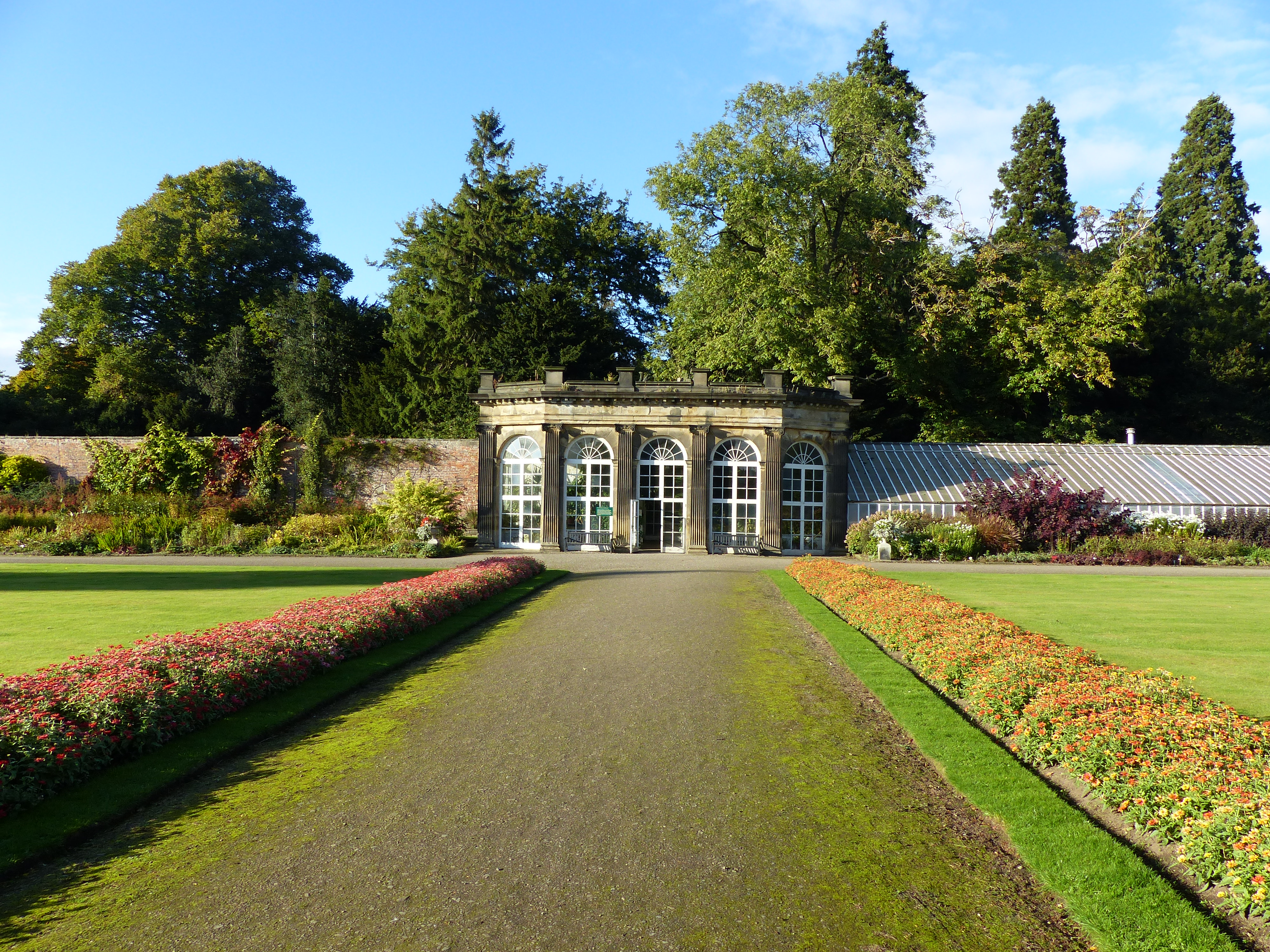
The orangery

The orangery may have been built about 1785. It is grade II* listed along with the surrounding walls, botheys, glasshouse and pavilions, which were gradually developed. The orangery is built of gritstone, and has a single story and fronts of five and two bays. On the front is a central doorway with a fanlight and full-height round-arched windows, between which are fluted ionic pilasters and a moulded entablature, a modillion cornice, and a parapet with vase balusters. The orangery is flanked by coped walls ending in two-bay pavilions in a similar style to the orangery. On the north side of the walls are the lean-to botheys and garden stores.

=== Stables ===
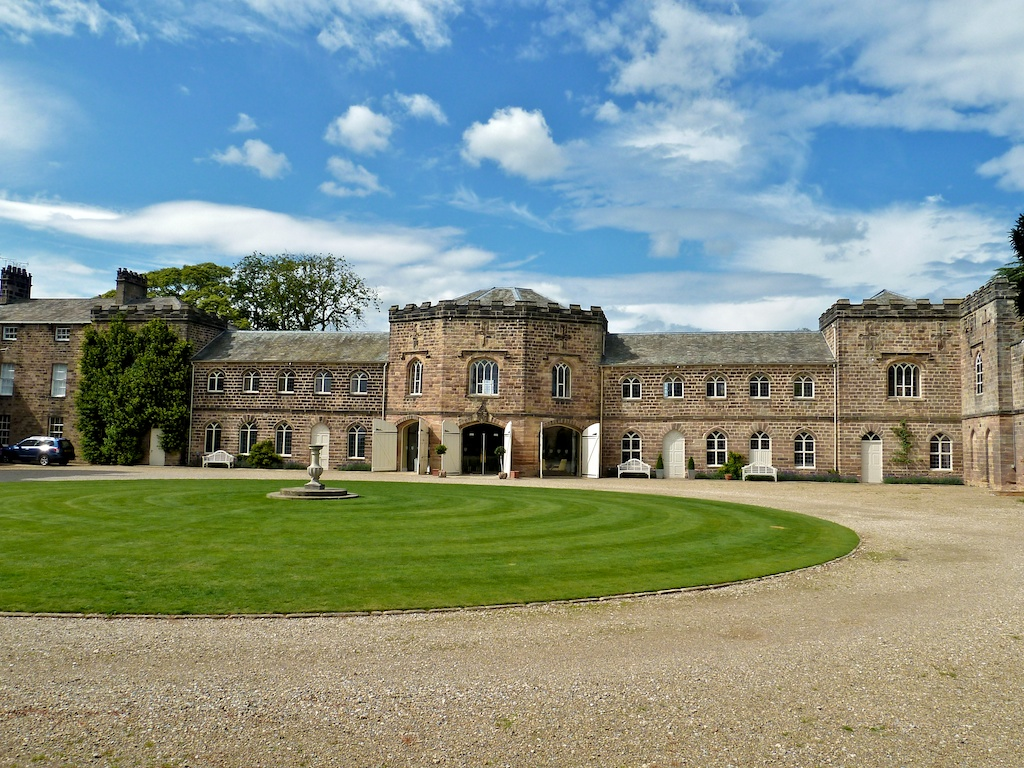
The stables

The stables, coach houses and service buildings were built in 1786 and are grade II* listed. They are constructed of gritstone with floor bands and a grey slate roof, and form two ranges at right angles. The north range has two storeys and 15 bays, the outer bays taller and embattled, and the middle three bays canted and embattled. The east range has a central gateway flanked by two-storey square towers, linked by lower two-storey five-bay ranges to two-storey end towers.

=== Tower and walls ===
The 16th-century tower is built of pink-grey gritstone, about 4 metres (13 ft) square, and has two or three storeys. It contains a narrow opening with a pointed arch, and has a moulded eaves band and an embattled parapet. The wall dates from the 19th century, it is in gritstone, about 400 metres (1,300 ft) in length and 2.5 metres (8 ft 2 in) in height, and has a coped embattled parapet. The tower and walls are jointly grade II listed.

=== Temple ===
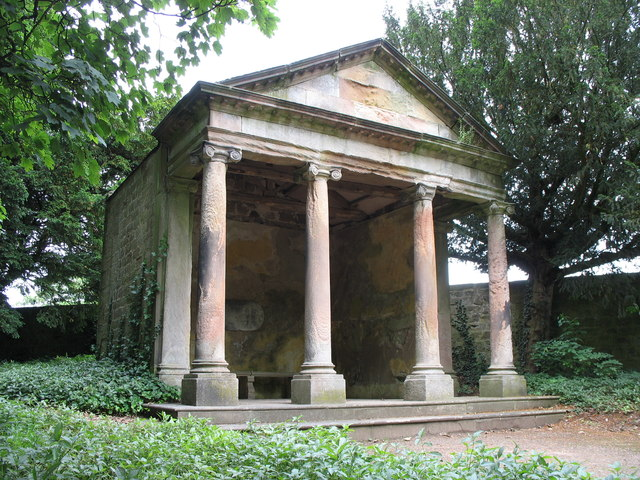
The temple

There is a folly in the form of a prostyle temple in the grounds to the north of the house. It may have been built around 1785, and is grade II listed. It is built of gritstone with quoins, and a grey-purple slate roof. It is approached by two moulded steps, and has four Ionic columns, an entablature, a modillion eaves cornice and a pediment. On the returns are Ionic pilasters.

== See also ==
- Grade I listed buildings in North Yorkshire (district)
- Listed buildings in Ripley, North Yorkshire
