= Ingilby baronets =

Set index for Ingilby baronets

There have been three baronetcies created for members of the Ingilby or Ingleby family, one in the Baronetage of England, one in the Baronetage of Great Britain and one in the Baronetage of the United Kingdom. The last title is extant, while the other two creations are extinct.

- Ingleby baronets of Ripley Castle (1642)
- Ingilby baronets of Ripley Castle (1781)
- Ingilby baronets, of Ripley Castle and Harrington (1866)
