= Sharow Cross =

Stone structure in Sharow, North Yorkshire, England

Coordinates: 54°08′33″N 1°30′23″W

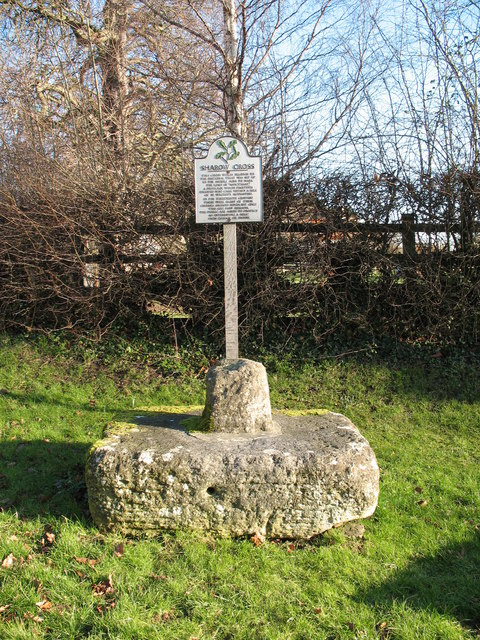
The structure, in 2007

The Sharow Cross is a historic structure in Sharow, a village in North Yorkshire, in England.

Perhaps in the 13th century, eight sanctuary crosses were erected, one alongside each route leading into Ripon, one mile from Ripon Minster. They marked the boundary of the area of sanctuary, which could be claimed by anyone touching one of the crosses. The other seven have been lost, but part of the Sharow Cross survives. It is owned by the National Trust, and has been grade II* listed since 1967.

The cross is constructed of limestone, and consists of a base about 80 centimetres (31 in) by 60 centimetres (24 in), and about 30 centimetres (12 in) in height. The lower part of the cross is set into a cavity in the block, and rises to a height of about 40 centimetres (16 in). The base stands on a stone foundation.

== See also ==
- Grade II* listed buildings in North Yorkshire (district)
- Listed buildings in Sharow
