= St John's Church, Sharow =

Church in Sharow, North Yorkshire, England

Coordinates: 54°08′37″N 1°30′00″W

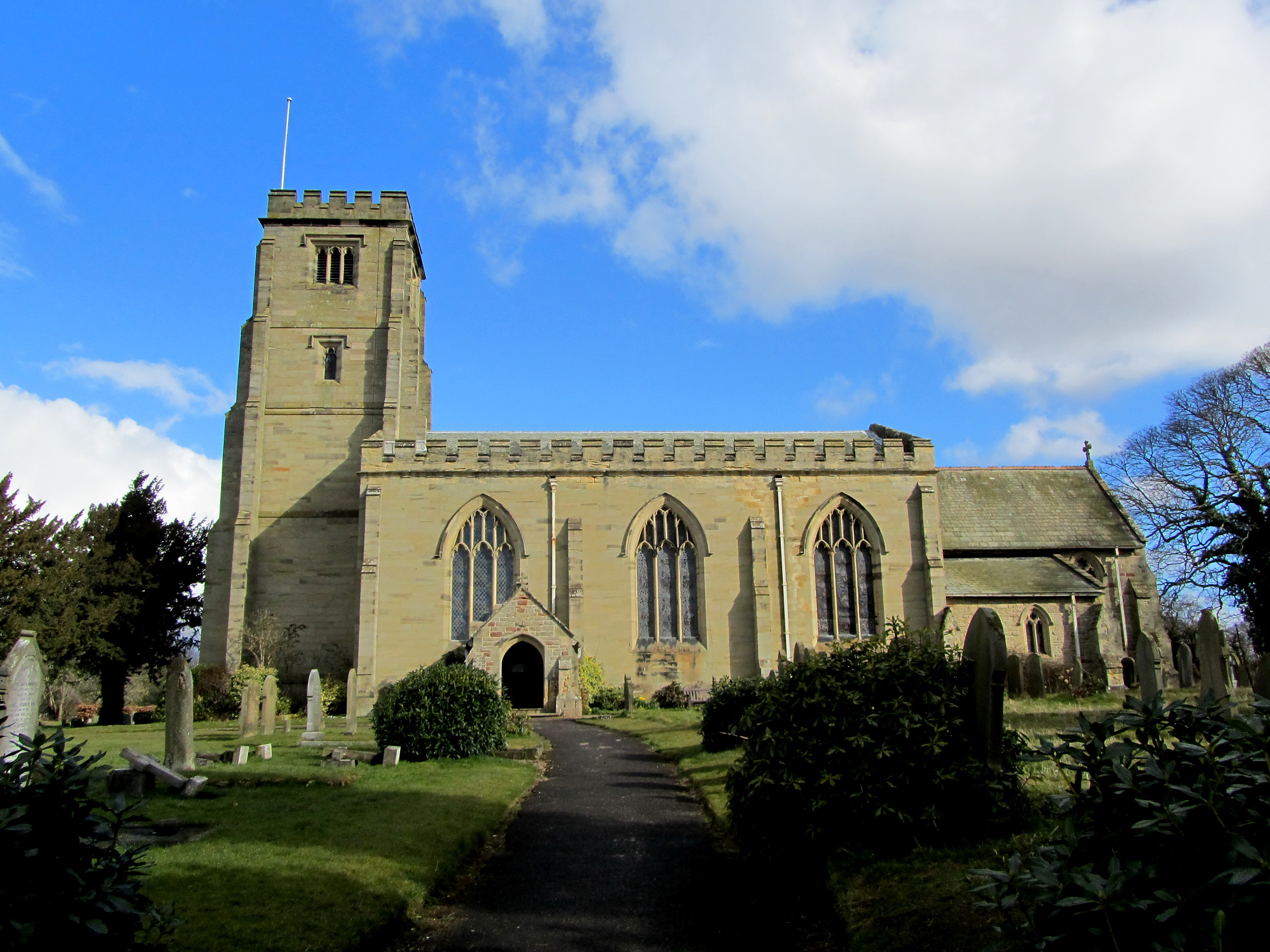
The church, in 2013

St John's Church is the parish church of Sharow, a village in North Yorkshire, in England.

The church was built in 1825, to a design by George Knowles. A chancel was added to the church between 1873 and 1874, with side chapels and a vestry following soon after. The east window of the original structure was moved to the new chancel. The building was grade II listed in 1966.

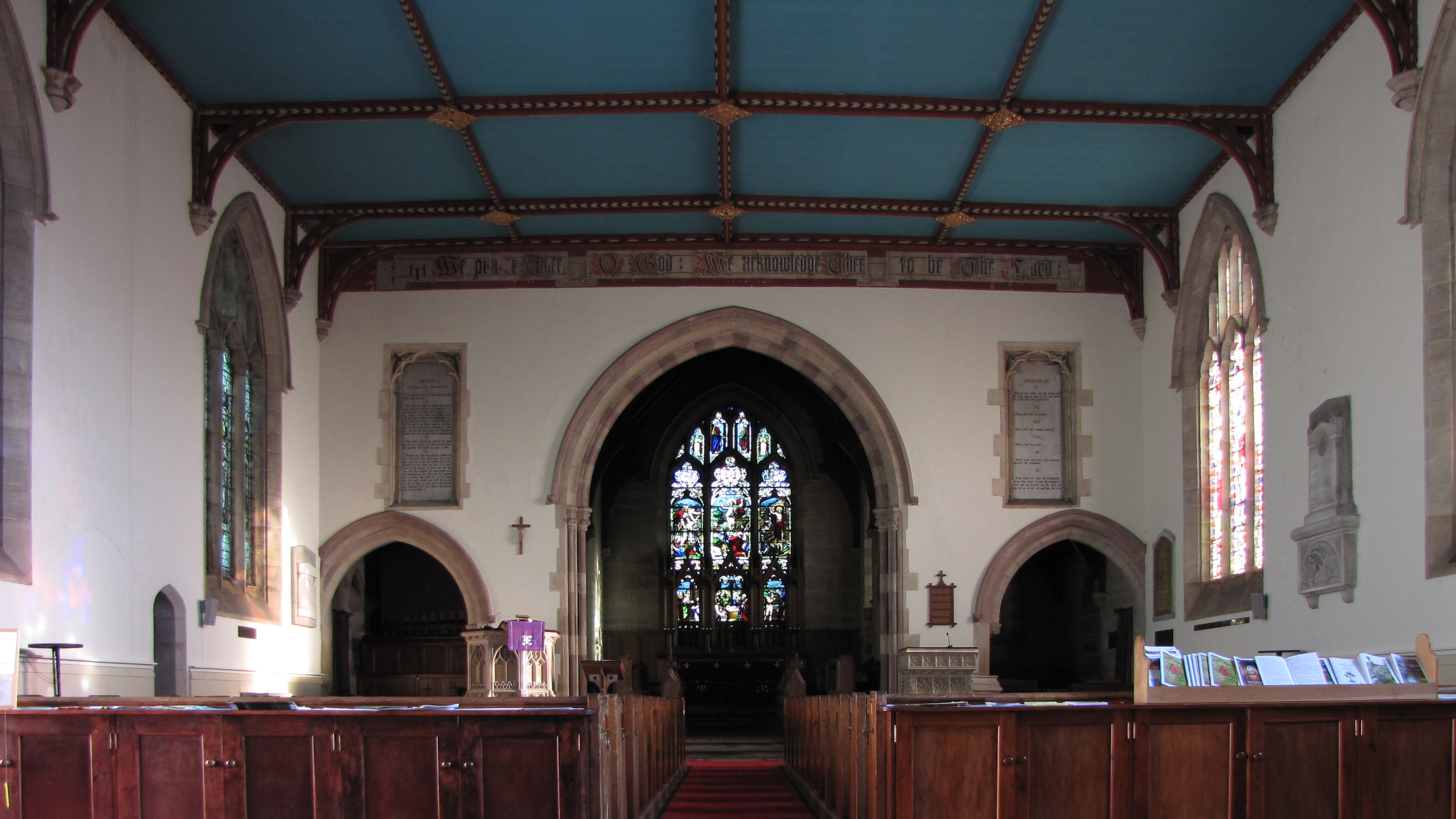
View from the nave into the chancel

The church is built of stone with a slate roof, and consists of a nave, a south porch, a chancel with a south chapel and a north organ and vestry, and a west tower. The tower has four stages, corner buttresses, a trefoil-headed window in the third stage and three-light trefoil headed bell openings, all with hood moulds, and an embattled parapet. The nave also has an embattled parapet. Inside, the nave has a timber roof embossed with gold, while the chancel has a tiled floor, and the original choir stalls. The east window contains glass painted by George Hedgeland. The nave has a marble memorial to Knowles, with a carving of a broken bridge and a weeping willow tree.

== See also ==
- Listed buildings in Sharow
