= Bridge Hewick =

Village and civil parish in North Yorkshire, England

Coordinates: 54.12884°N 1.48418°W

- Location within North Yorkshire
- OS grid reference: SE338704
  - London: 190 mi (310 km) SSE
- Civil parish: Bridge Hewick
- Unitary authority: North Yorkshire
- Ceremonial county: North Yorkshire
- Region: Yorkshire and the Humber
- Country: England
- Sovereign state: United Kingdom
- Post town: RIPON
- Postcode district: HG4
- Police: North Yorkshire
- Fire: North Yorkshire
- Ambulance: Yorkshire

Bridge Hewick is a village and civil parish in North Yorkshire, England. The village is situated on the River Ure, and approximately 2 miles (3 km) east of the cathedral city of Ripon. The population was recorded at less than 100 at the 2011 Census. Details are included on the statistics of the civil parish of Copt Hewick. North Yorkshire County Council estimate that the population at the 2011 census was 50, which had risen to 60 by 2015.

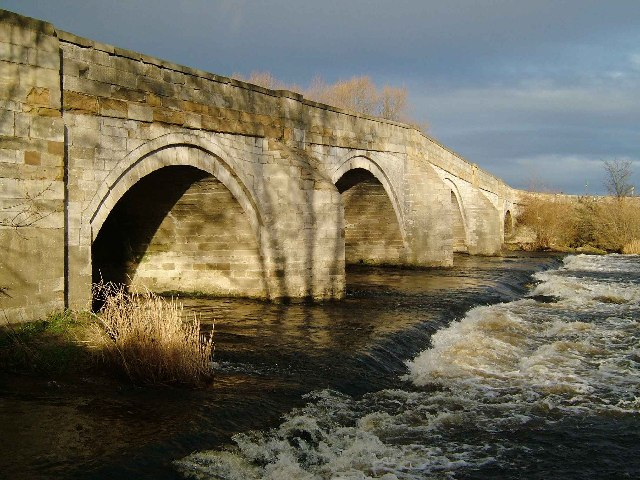
B6265 road bridge over the River Ure at Bridge Hewick

According to A Dictionary of British Place Names, 'Bridge Hewick' could be derived from the Old English 'brycg' for "at the bridge", with 'heah+wic', meaning a "high or chief dairy-farm". Hewick is recorded in the 1086 Domesday Book as "Heawic", in the Hallikeld Hundred of the West Riding of Yorkshire. Listed for the settlement are three ploughlands and a meadow of one acre. In 1066 the lord of Hewick was Ealdred, Archbishop of York; lordship in 1086, after the Conquest, was held by the following archbishop, Thomas of Bayeux, who was also Tenant-in-chief to King William.

In 1837, Bridge Hewick's population was 77. In 1870–02 Bridge Hewick was a township of 867 acres (4 km^{2}) in the civil parish of Ripon, with a population of 89 in 18 houses. A chapel in Bridge Hewick was in 1826 described as "in ruins".

Until 1974 it was part of the West Riding of Yorkshire. From 1974 to 2023 it was part of the Borough of Harrogate. It is now administered by the unitary North Yorkshire Council.

The Bridge Hewick local public house is the Black-A-Moor Inn. The Bridge over the River Ure is the starting point of a circular walk around Ripon known as the Sanctuary Way Walk.
