= Listed buildings in Sharow =

Sharow is a civil parish in the county of North Yorkshire, England. It contains seven listed buildings that are recorded in the National Heritage List for England. Of these, one is listed at Grade II*, the middle of the three grades, and the others are at Grade II, the lowest grade. The parish contains the village of Sharow and the surrounding area. All the listed buildings are in the village, and consist of the remains of a sanctuary cross, a country house and associated stables, smaller houses, a church, and a memorial in the churchyard.

== Key ==
Grade	Criteria
II*	Particularly important buildings of more than special interest
II	Buildings of national importance and special interest

== Buildings ==
Name and location	Photograph	Date	Notes	Grade
Sharow Cross; 54.14264°N 1.50629°W		13th century (probable)	The remaining parts of a sanctuary cross. It is in limestone, and consists of a base about 80 centimetres (31 in) by 60 centimetres (24 in), and about 30 centimetres (12 in) in height. The lower part of the cross is set into a cavity in the block, and rises to a height of about 40 centimetres (16 in). The base stands on a stone foundation.	II*
The Manor House; 54.14077°N 1.49839°W		Mid-18th century	The house is in brick, with a moulded floor band, cogged eaves and a stone slate roof. There are two storeys, a main range of five bays, and an earlier range to the right with two bays. On the main range is a doorway with a plain surround, above it is a blind window, and the other windows are sashes in architraves. The right range contains a bow window, with 20th-century windows above.	II
Sharow Hall; 54.13931°N 1.49642°W		c. 1800	A large country house, it is rendered and has roofs in grey and purple slate. There are two storeys and the main range faces south with five bays, and facing east are ranges of one and two storeys. The middle bay of the main range projects lightly, and has a porch and a doorway with a fanlight. The windows are sashes with lintels and keystones. Recessed to the right is a single-storey hall containing sash windows between Tuscan pilasters, a cornice and a band. On the right return is a Doric porch with columns, pilasters, an entablature and a cornice.	II
Stables, Sharow Hall; 54.13947°N 1.49614°W	—	Late 18th to early 19th century	The stable block is in red brick, with a floor band and a hipped blue slate roof. There are two storeys and three bays. The middle bay projects lightly under a coped gable with kneelers containing an oculus. The bay contains two round-arched carriage entrances. The left bay has two tall round-arched entrances, with stable doors, and an oculus. On the right bay are similar stable doors, and on the upper floor are oculi. On the roof is a weathervane, and a pendant with a date.	II
Sharow Grange; 54.14059°N 1.49845°W	—	Early 19th century	The house is in brick with a stone slate roof. There are two storeys and three bays. The central doorway has a divided fanlight, and the windows are sashes, those on the upper floor horizontally siding. All the openings have incised wedge lintels and keystones.	II
St John's Church; 54.14360°N 1.50003°W		1824–25	The chancel was added to the church in 1873–74. The church is built in stone with a slate roof, and consists of a nave, a south porch, a chancel with a south chapel and a north organ and vestry, and a west tower. The tower has four stages, corner buttresses, a trefoil-headed window in the third stage and three-light trefoil headed bell openings, all with hood moulds, and an embattled parapet. The nave also has an embattled parapet.	II
Memorial to Charles and Jessie Piazzi Smyth; 54.14363°N 1.50050°W		c. 1900	The memorial is in the churchyard of St John's Church, to the west of the church, and commemorates the astronomer Charles Piazzi Smyth and his wife, Jessica Duncan Piazzi Smyth. The memorial consists of a stone pyramid about 2 metres (6 ft 7 in) in height, and is surmounted by a cross. On the east side are two bronze plaques recording their lives and achievements.	II
