= Ripon Town Hall =

Municipal building in Ripon, North Yorkshire, England

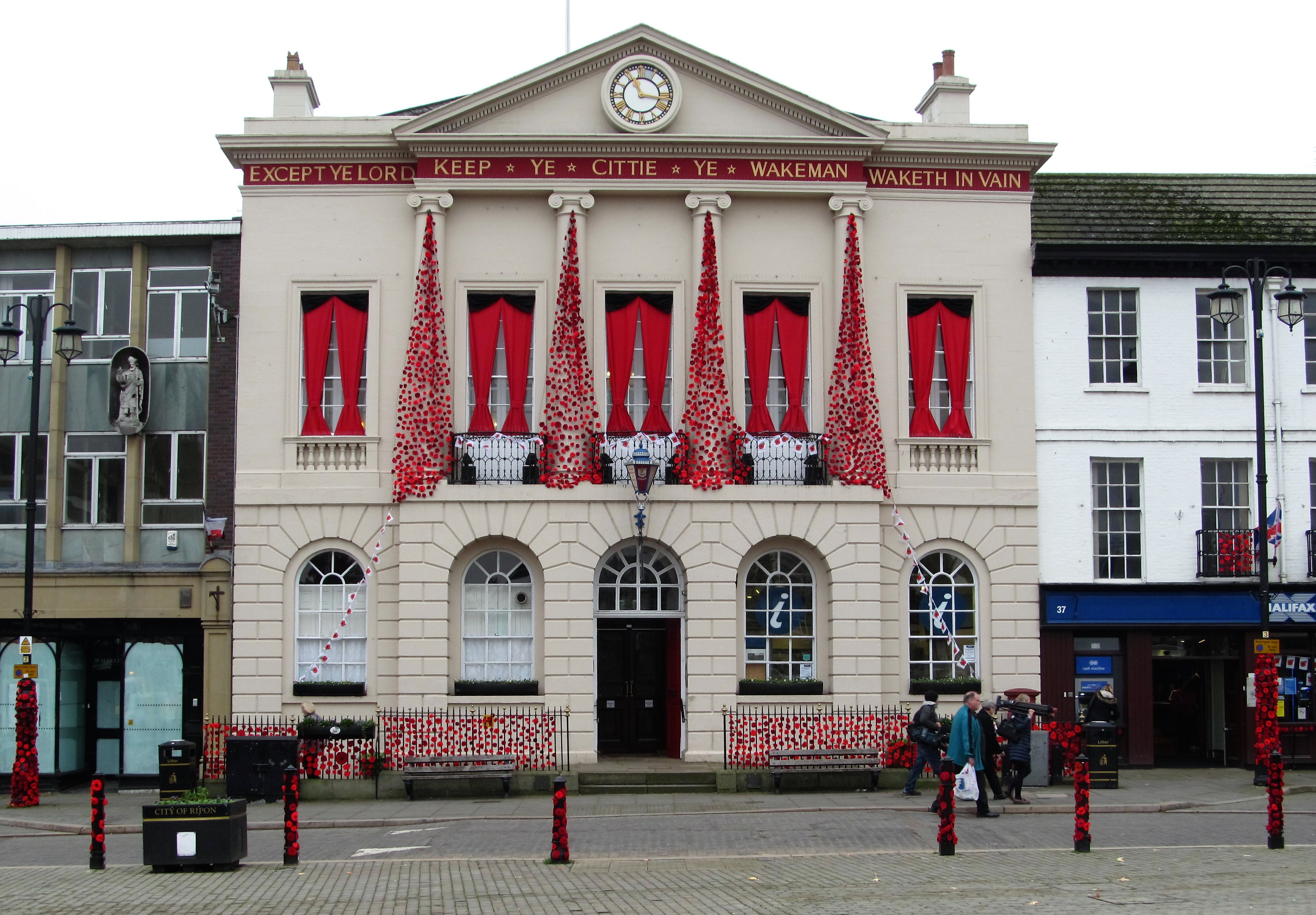
- Ripon Town Hall

- Shown in North Yorkshire
- 54.1358°N 1.5239°W
- Location: Market Place, Ripon

History
- Built: 1799

Site notes
- Architect: James Wyatt
- Architectural style: Neoclassical style

Listed Building – Grade II*
- Official name: Ripon Town Hall
- Designated: 27 May 1949
- Reference no.: 1174370

Ripon Town Hall is a municipal building in the Market Place, Ripon, North Yorkshire, England. The structure, which was the headquarters of Ripon Borough Council, is a Grade II* listed building.

== History ==
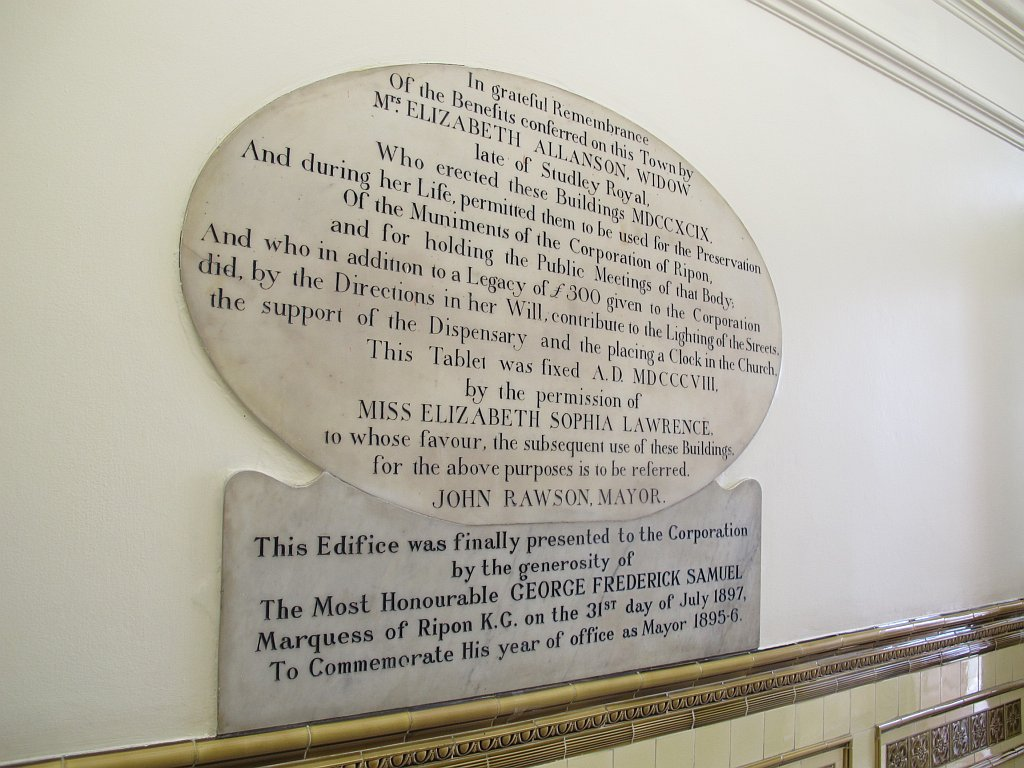
Plaque in the town hall which acknowledges the role of Elizabeth Allanson in commissioning the building

The building was commissioned, as a place for preserving the borough muniments, by Elizabeth Allanson, who had inherited Studley Royal Park from her father, William Aislabie, and was also the widow of the former local Member of Parliament, Charles Allanson. The site she selected was occupied by two buildings, one of which was a public house which had previously been used by the borough council for its meetings.

The new building was designed by James Wyatt in the neoclassical style, built in brick with a stuccoed coating and was completed in 1799. The design involved a symmetrical main frontage with five bays facing onto the Market Square; the central section of three bays, which slightly projected forward, featured a round headed doorway with a fanlight on the ground floor flanked by round headed windows. There were three sash windows on the first floor protected by wrought-iron railings and flanked by Ionic order columns supporting an frieze as well as a modillioned pediment. Internally, the principal room was the council chamber on the first floor.

Following the death of Elizabeth Allanson, ownership of the building passed to her niece, Mrs Elizabeth Sophie Lawrence, in 1808, then to a distant relative, Thomas de Grey, 2nd Earl de Grey, in 1845 and then to Grey's nephew, the Marquess of Ripon, in 1859: also, in that year, the Yorkshire Agricultural Show Horticultural Society decided to pay for a clock which was installed in the tympanum of the pediment.

In August 1886, as a permanent record of the Ripon Millenary Festival, a pageant to celebrate the supposed millenary of the granting of a Royal Charter to Ripon by Alfred the Great, the frieze at the top of the building was inscribed with the words "Except Ye Lord Keep Ye Cittie Ye Wakeman Waketh in Vain". The inscription reflects Psalm 127 "unless the Lord keeps the city, the watchman waketh but in vain." The substitution of the word "wakeman" for "watchman" refers to the wakeman or horn blower who was responsible blowing the horn at the corners of the market cross at 9pm every night at the start of the nightly patrol to identify any enemies in the city. The Marquess of Ripon assigned the building to the borough as a gift on 31 July 1897.

The town hall continued to serve as the headquarters of the borough council for much of the 20th century but it ceased to be the local seat of government after the enlarged Harrogate District Council was formed in 1974. Concerns over the deteriorating fabric of the building led to Ripon City Council, as tenant, to request, in March 2021, that Harrogate Borough Council, as owner of the building, carry out urgent repairs.

Works of Art in the town hall include a portrait by Henry Milbourne of the benefactor, Elizabeth Allanson, a portrait by Sir James Thornhill of the former Chancellor of the Exchequer, John Aislabie, and a portrait by Sir Thomas Lawrence of the former Prime Minister, Viscount Goderich.

== See also ==
- Grade II* listed buildings in North Yorkshire (district)
- Listed buildings in Ripon
