= Ripon Spa Baths =

Grade II listed building in Ripon, North Yorkshire

Coordinates: 54°08′10″N 1°31′39″W

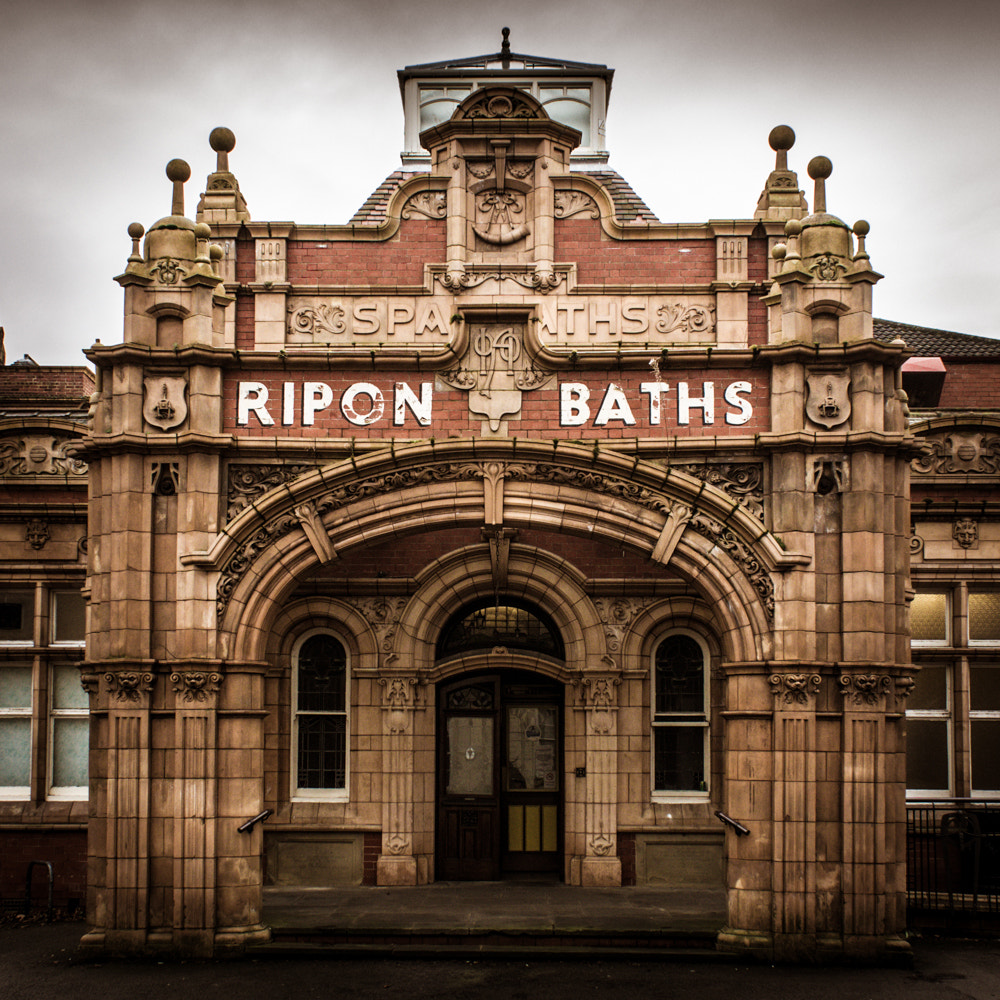
The porte-cochère and entrance door

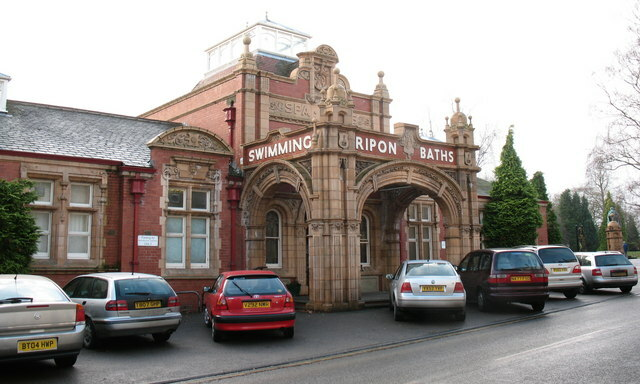
Frontage viewed from the east

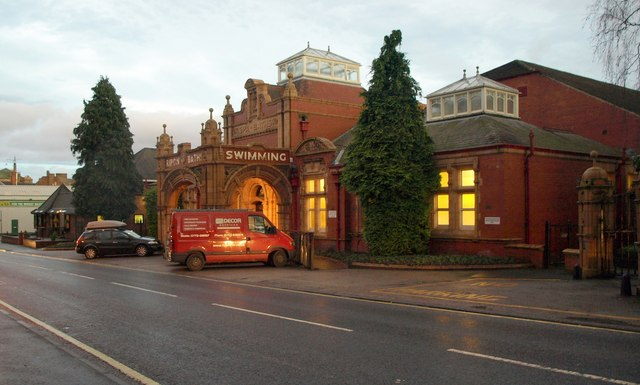
Frontage viewed from the west

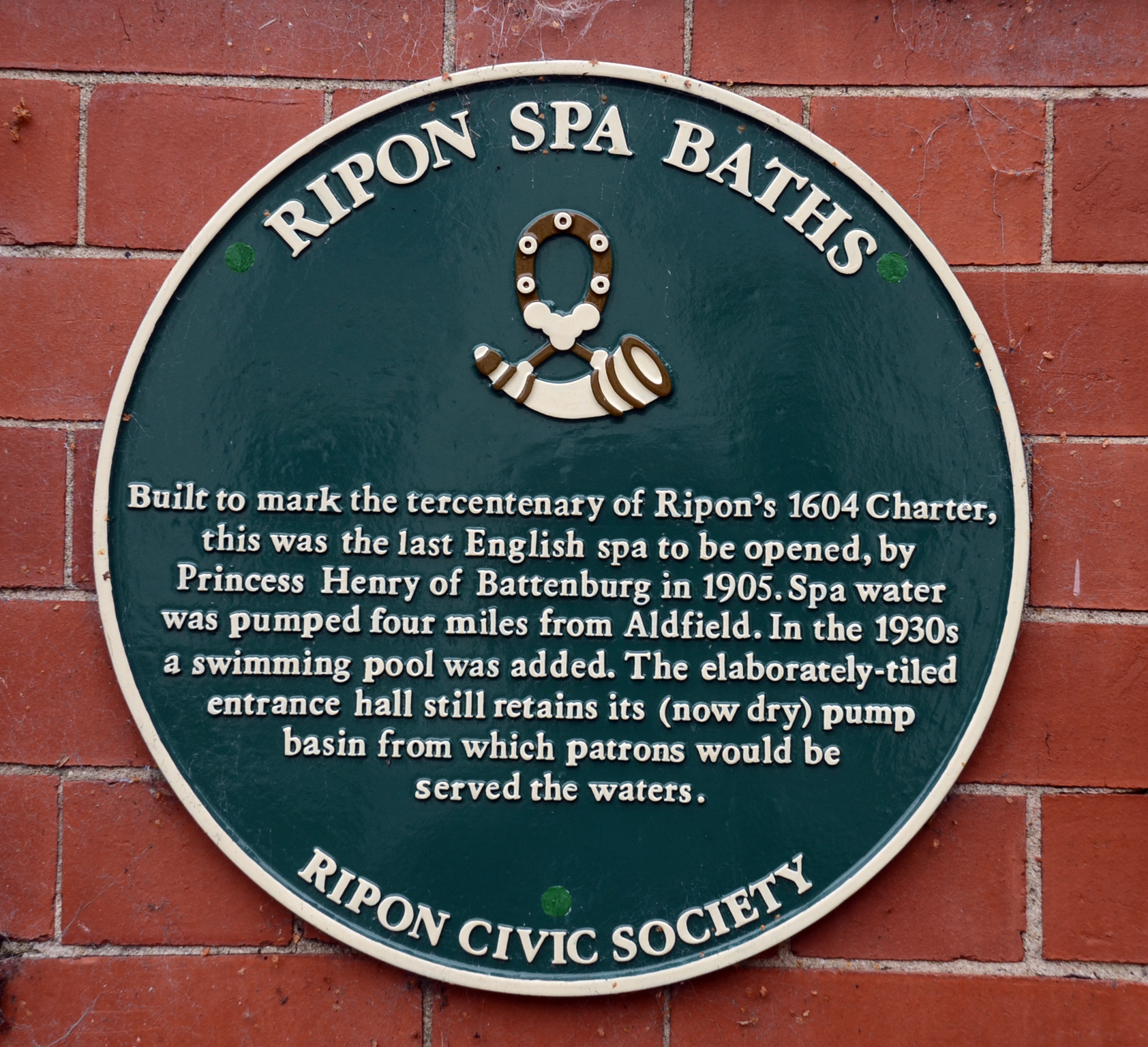
Detail of plaque affixed to the structure in 2013

The Ripon Spa Baths are a grade II listed building in Ripon, North Yorkshire, England. It was built between 1904–05 as a spa but failed to compete with the larger facilities at nearby Harrogate. In 1936 a new pool was constructed to the rear and the facility converted to a swimming baths. The building is noted for its ornate terracotta-clad frontage and received listed building protection in 1980. Harrogate Borough Council proposed selling the building for housing development in 2008 on the grounds that it required significant structural repair. The sale was cancelled but in 2021 the council made a new proposal to sell the structure.

== Background ==
Ripon is a small cathedral city in North Yorkshire, located around 12 miles (19 km) north of the larger settlement of Harrogate, a traditional spa town. There was some interest in providing a public bathing facility in Ripon in the late 19th century and this was the first campaign of the local Women's Institute. The cathedral paid to construct 20 changing cubicles on the banks of the River Ure in 1890 but campaigning continued for an indoor facility. Unlike Harrogate, Ripon was poorly served by natural springs, having only two of note that provided small quantities of water, insufficient to supply a spa facility.

== Construction and operation ==
Construction of the spa was begun by Ripon Borough Council in 1904, with the foundation stone being laid to commemorate the 300th anniversary of the granting of a royal charter by James VI and I. The structure was designed by Samuel Stead and was completed in 1905. Water was pumped to the site through a 4-mile (6.4 km) pipeline from a sulphur-rich spring at Aldfield. Although much of the structure was "relatively utilitarian" the frontage, on Park Street, is described by Historic England as "exceptionally elaborate". The building is built in red brick with slate roof tiles, it is single storey apart from the foyer where a pyramidal roof and glazed clerestory extends to first floor height. The foyer roof has a parapet, with central cartouche on the front elevation, and pilastered corners with ball-shaped finials. The entrance door is a round arch with a segment-shaped transom window above and round-arched windows either side. A porte-cochère extends from the entrance with arch-shaped entrances between substantial pillars, this feature would have provided shelter to visitors arriving at the baths.

The frontage extends four bays east of the entrance and three bays to the west and has mullioned windows with transoms. The bay on either side of the entrance is more elaborate with a segment-shaped pediment above. The frontage is dressed with terracotta cladding, largely in arts and crafts style but with Art Nouveau influences. The rainwater downpipes are cast iron and the collection heads are marked with the date of 1904. The interior is art nouveau in style with extensive use of ornamental tiles and stained-glass windows, including one depicting Æthelstan granting the city a charter in 924. The council paid extra to have pomegranates engraved on the mahogany entrance doors and to install a statue of a river god in the main pump room, with the main water inlet emanating from his mouth. It is the only art nouveau-style structure in Ripon.

The spa was opened on 24 October 1905 by Princess Henry of Battenberg and her daughter Princess Victoria Eugenie of Battenberg; during the ceremony the royal party unlocked the entrance door with a gold key. According to Ripon Borough Council it is the only spa in the country to have been opened by a member of the royal family. It was the last traditional spa to open in Britain and struggled to make an impact in a market already saturated by other spa towns. Ripon Spa suffered particularly from competition from large facilities available at nearby Harrogate, which had 88 natural mineral springs. The spa's pump room closed in 1936 when the facility was converted into a swimming baths, with a pool added to the rear. The structure was granted statutory protection as a grade II listed building on 11 June 1980.

== Proposed sale in 2008 ==
The local government of Ripon moved to Harrogate Borough Council in 1974, with Ripon retaining a parish council, known as Ripon City Council. Many in Ripon resented the change noting that their settlement's charter predates that of Harrogate by 960 years. In 2008 Harrogate Borough Council proposed selling the spa to housing developers, stating that it had structural problems that would cost £1.3 million to fix and that the proceeds would be used to construct a new £3.5 million swimming pool at Ripon Leisure Centre which had been built by Ripon City Council but which had been transferred to Harrogate Borough Council for financial reasons. The asking price for Ripon Spa Baths was £3.3 million.

The construction of the new pool at the leisure centre would require the relocation of an existing skate park and children's playground from an area which had been donated to the city by a local alderman. Harrogate Borough Council claimed that the single pool at the Spa Baths was problematic, meaning the facility had to close to the public when the pool was hired out for lessons. Ripon residents campaigned to save the pool and the strength of feeling surprised Harrogate Borough Council. Council leader Michael Gardner said: "the spa baths are worn out and the city deserves facilities of a high standard. Yet we're getting so much resistance when the reaction should surely be: good old Harrogate, they want to spend money on us". Residents proposed that, instead of conversion to private housing, the Spa Baths be repurposed as a cinema, tourist information centre, citizens advice bureau or as an extension to the neighbouring Ripon Community Hospital. The plans did not proceed. On 11 June 2013 Harrogate Borough Council erected a plaque on the structure to mark its history.

== Proposed sale in 2021 ==
Harrogate Borough Council continued with the construction of a new swimming pool at Ripon Leisure centre anyway, expected to be finished in early 2021 at a cost of £10.2 million. Following delays caused by the COVID-19 pandemic in England, which also saw the closure of Ripon Spa Baths during lockdowns, the completion of the new pool was delayed until November 2021. As only a single pool was agreed to the development did not solve the issue that the Spa Baths pool had, that there was no alternative when hired out by third parties. In February 2021 Harrogate Borough Council again proposed the sale of Ripon Spa Baths. An asking price was not disclosed but the premises were advertised as suitable for "low density residential use, community uses and other uses appropriate to town centre locations". The sale has been opposed by Ripon City Council, Ripon Civic Society and Ripon Together, a local business group. They have urged that the sale be put on hold while a community use is explored and have suggested the building becomes an art gallery, museum or bowling alley. The Spa Baths closed on 7 November, with the council saying a buyer had been found for the building. With the new baths not open Ripon has been left without a swimming pool since 2021. A private buyer purchased the spa and baths complex in 2024 for £2 million, and they intend to renovate the building and develop it into a hospitality venue.

== See also ==
- Listed buildings in Ripon
