= Sharow =

Village and civil parish in North Yorkshire, England

Coordinates: 54°08′32″N 1°29′59″W

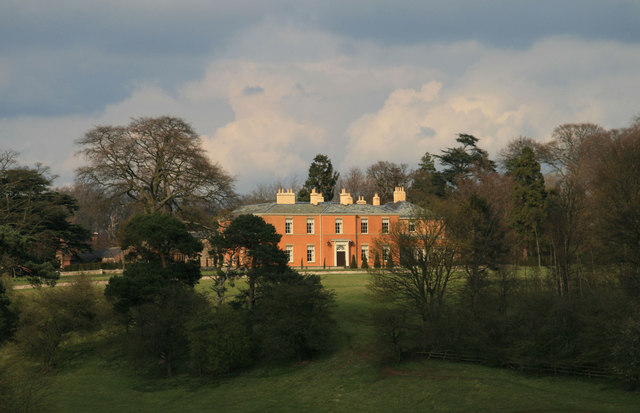
- The 18th century Sharow Hall

- Location within North Yorkshire
- Population: 556 (2011 Census)
- OS grid reference: SE327719
- Civil parish: Sharow
- Unitary authority: North Yorkshire
- Ceremonial county: North Yorkshire
- Region: Yorkshire and the Humber
- Country: England
- Sovereign state: United Kingdom
- Post town: RIPON
- Postcode district: HG4
- Police: North Yorkshire
- Fire: North Yorkshire
- Ambulance: Yorkshire

Sharow is a village and civil parish in the county of North Yorkshire, England. It is about 1 mile (1.6 km) north-east of Ripon. The name Sharow derives from the Old English of 'Scearu' and 'Hōh' which translates as boundary hill-spur or a share/division of a sharply projecting piece of land. In the 2001 Census, the village was registered as having a population of 546, which had risen slightly to 556 at the 2011 Census. In 2015, North Yorkshire County Council estimated the population to have dropped to 540.

Until 1974 it was part of the West Riding of Yorkshire. From 1974 to 2023 it was part of the Borough of Harrogate, it is now administered by the unitary North Yorkshire Council.

The village has a Church of England primary school which was rated as 'Good' by Ofsted in 2016 after previously being listed as 'Requires Improvement' in 2014. St John's Church, Sharow gained Eco-Status in 2017, the fifth one in the Diocese of Leeds to be awarded such status. The church's 2-acre (0.81 ha) churchyard has been managed effectively since 1992 and now is home to a selection of rare plant life, animals and insects. The church hit the headlines in June 2011 when a group of bellringers from Oxfordshire were locked in the church's tower by an irate local due to the noise they were creating. The group were released when a passer-by was alerted to their predicament.

The village has a pub (The Half Moon – now closed), Sharow Hall (which is not open to the public) and the remains of Sharow Cross, a sanctuary cross which signified that the traveller was within 1 mile (1.6 km) of the monastery in Ripon and therefore granted sanctuary. The cross is now a grade II* listed structure, and is one of the trail heads for the Sanctuary Way Walk. During the 19th century, the Archbishop of York was the lord of the manor.

Sharow currently has three Saturday cricket teams that play in the Nidderdale Amateur Cricket League. The teams play in the 2nd, 6th and 9th divisions, there are also two Wednesday evening teams who play in the Nidderdale Amateur Evening League and the Harrogate and District Evening League Division 7.

== See also ==
- Listed buildings in Sharow
