= Sanctuary Way Walk =

10-mile footpath around Ripon, England

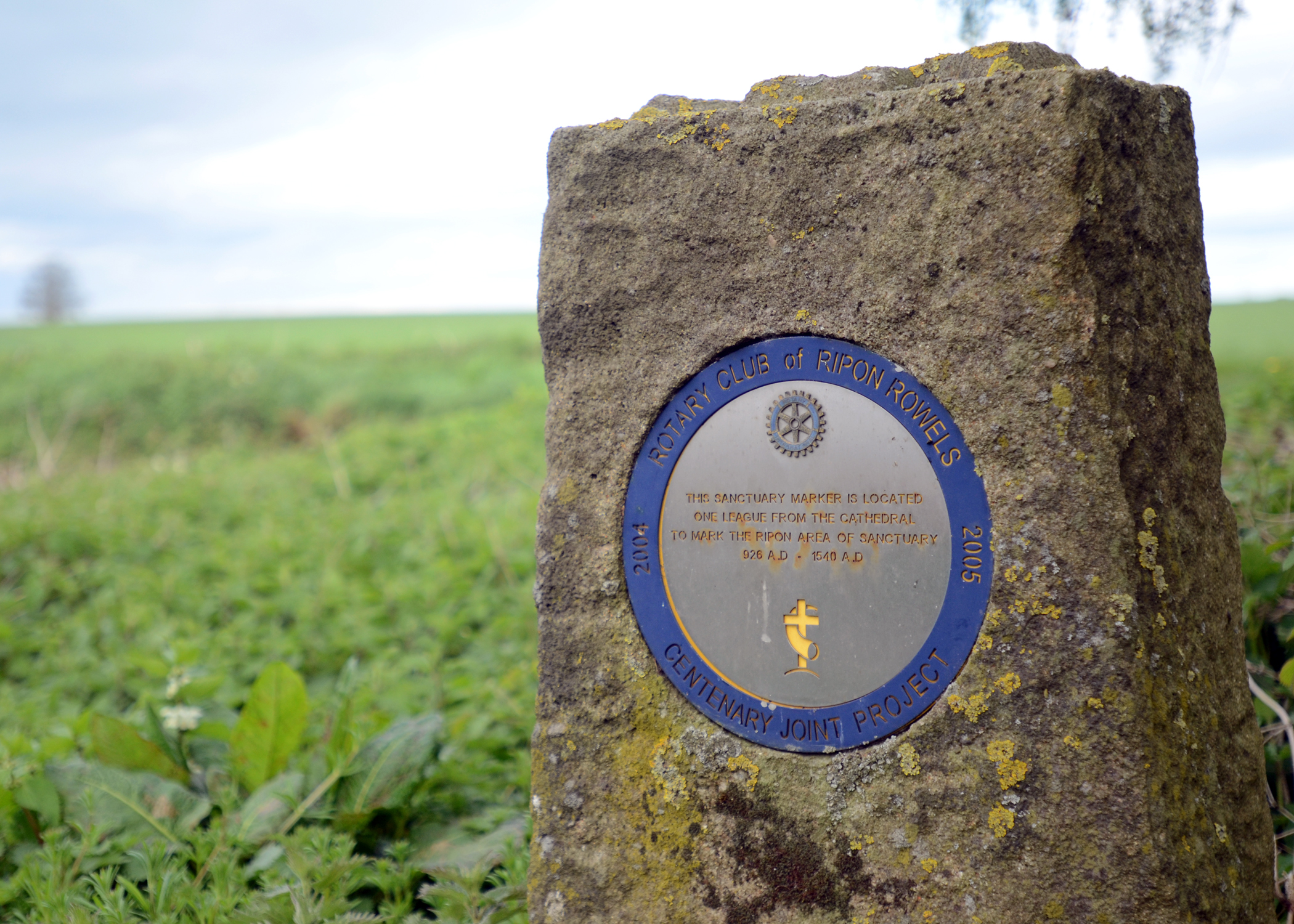
- Waymarker on the Sanctuary Way Walk outside of Ripon. The A61 road is just to the left of this image.
- Length: 10 miles (16 km) (full trail)
- Location: Ripon, North Yorkshire, England
- Established: 2005
- Trailheads: Bridge Hewick; Gallows Hill; The Cathedral
- Use: Hiking
- Difficulty: Easy (LWDA grading)

The Sanctuary Way Walk is a 10-mile (16 km) circular walk around the city of Ripon in North Yorkshire. The walk traces a route around the city and has eight trail points at the places where waymarkers used to indicate that travellers were within 1-mile (1.6 km) of the cathedral at Ripon and thus afforded the Sanctuary of Ripon. The waymarker at Sharow is the base of one of the crosses that used to mark the edge of the Sanctuary of Ripon.

== History ==
In 937, (Note: Most sources cite 937. However, the waymarkers themselves state the date as 926 AD (see photograph), as do some other sources. Speight maintains that the Liberty of Wilfrid was granted to the Holy See of York in 937 after Athelstan's victory over the 'Pagan' Danes.) King Athelstan created the Sanctuary of Ripon by placing eight crosses on the roads approaching the city. Some of the crosses were given names: Cross of Athelstan, Kangel Cross and Sharow Cross. The sanctuary was known as the Liberty of St Wilfrid and was maintained by the ecclesiastical body in the city. The boundary waymarkers have all since been removed or destroyed except the remnants of the base of one of the crosses at Sharow, which is now a listed monument. The sanctuary lasted until 1540 when the authorities looking after law and order became secular.

== The routes ==
The path was created in 2004 by the Rotary Club of Ripon and the Rotary Club of Ripon Rowels, who designed it as a celebration of the Rotary Club's 100-year anniversary of 2005. There are actually three walks which take two, three and four hours respectively, with each being longer in length than the previous one.

- The Red Route runs from Bridge Hewick to the cathedral in Ripon via North Bridge and is listed as being the most scenic part of the route.
- The Green Route has the same starting point as the Red Route but ventures further north before turning back by the golf club and finishing at the cathedral.
- The Blue Route is the full 10-mile (16 km) which starts at Bridge Hewick east of the city and goes in a circular anti-clockwise direction around the city to finish at Gallows Hill just south of the cathedral.
