= Ripon =

City in North Yorkshire, England

Coordinates: 54°08′10″N 1°31′25″W

- City
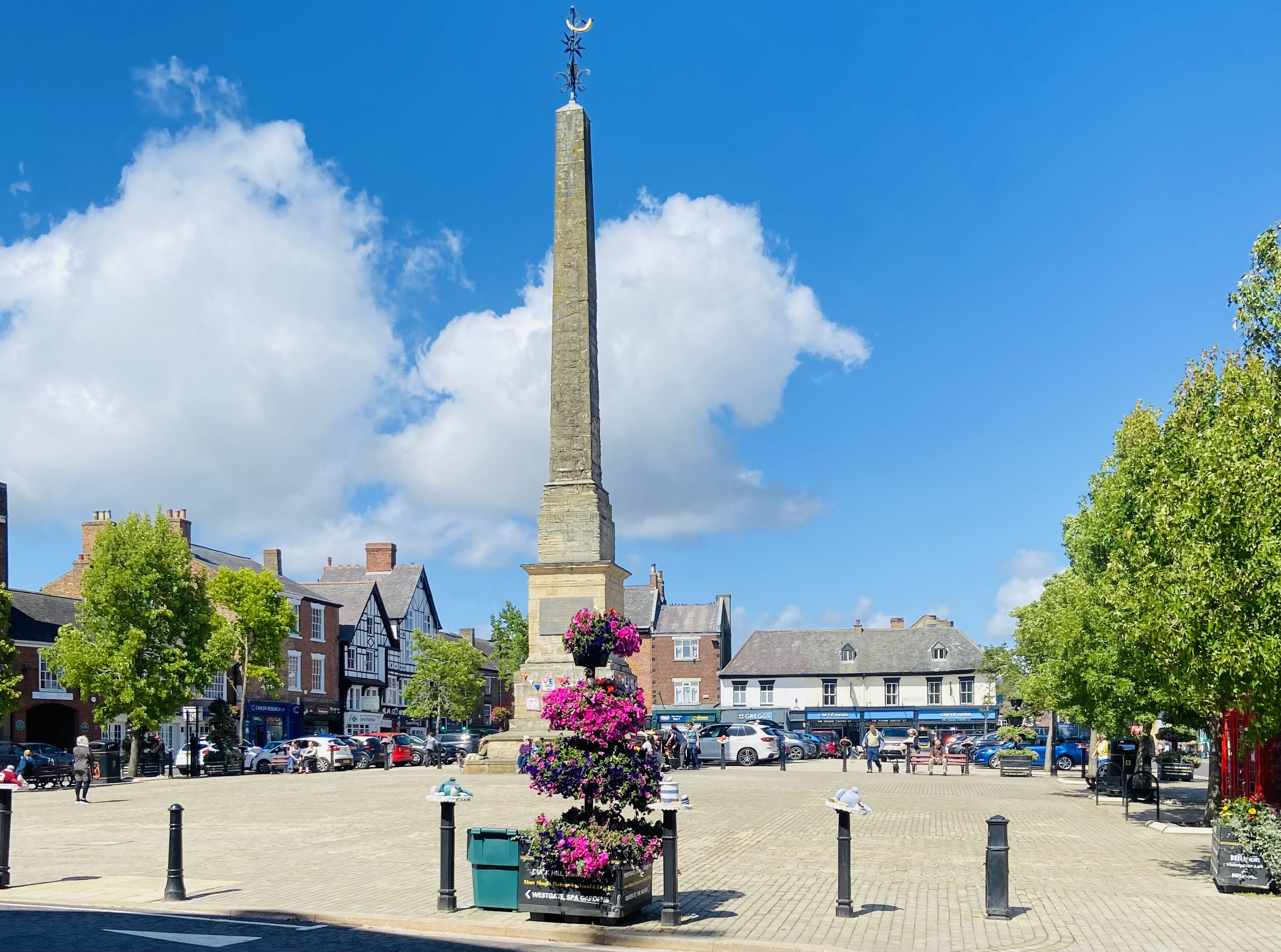
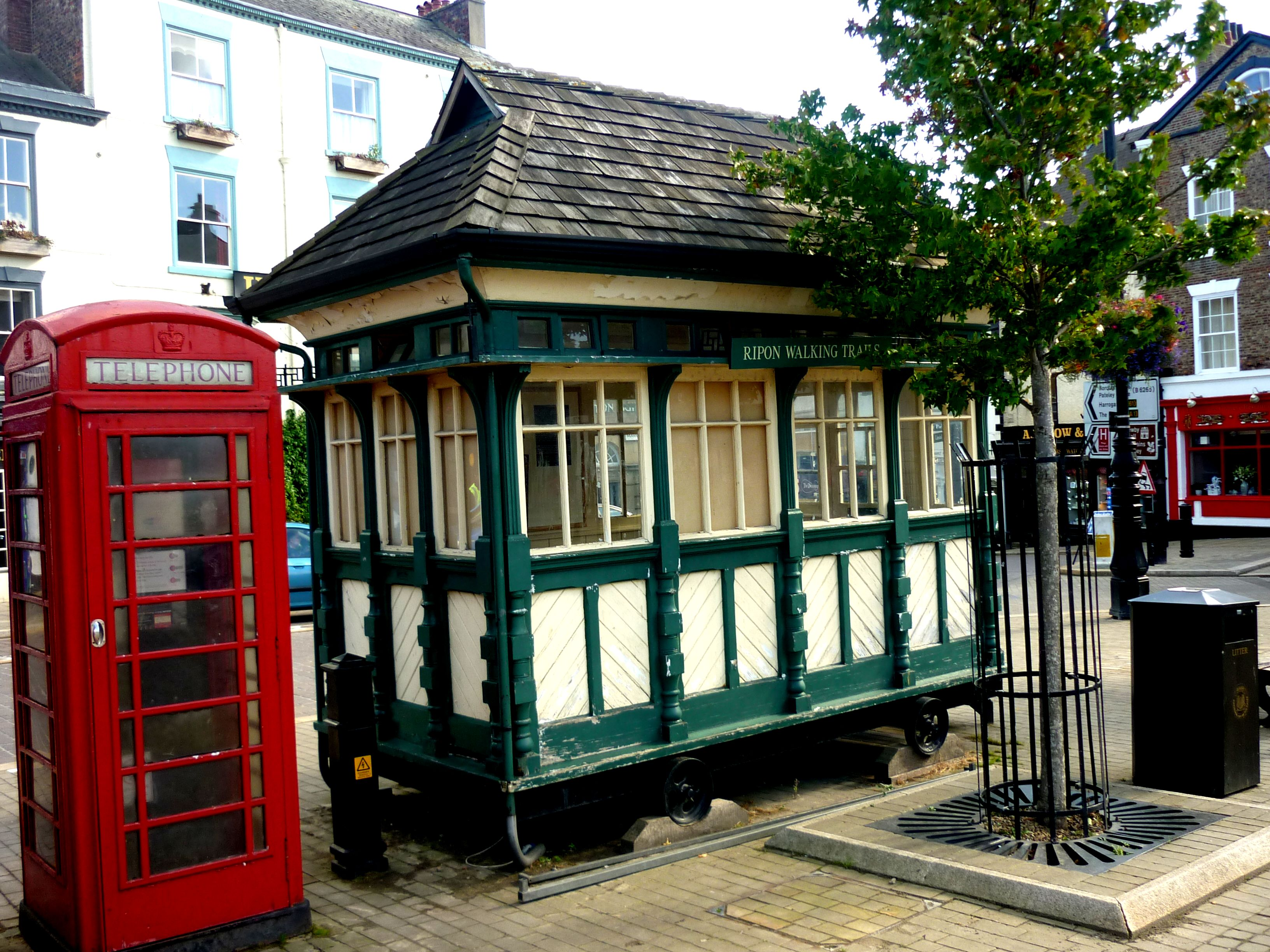
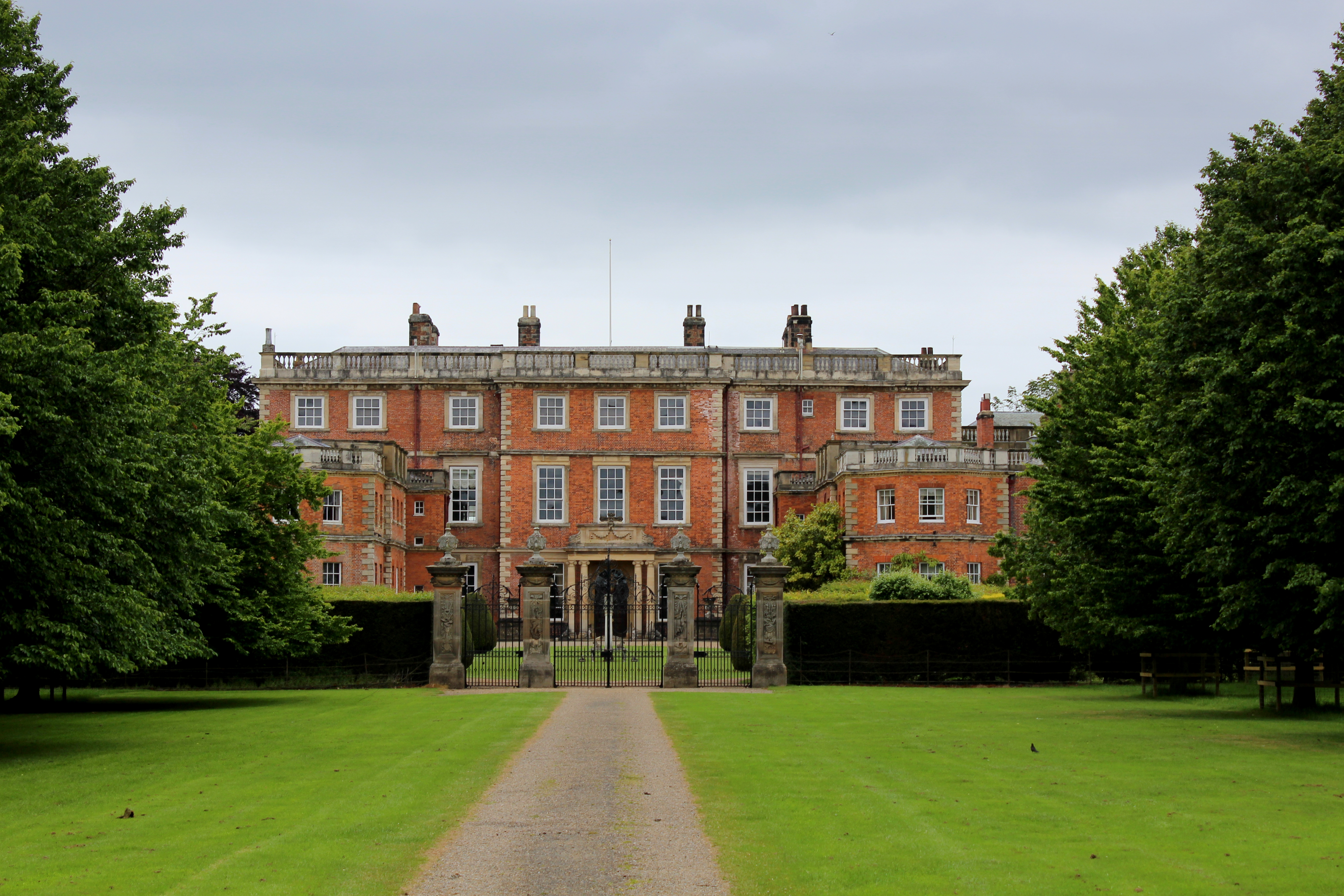
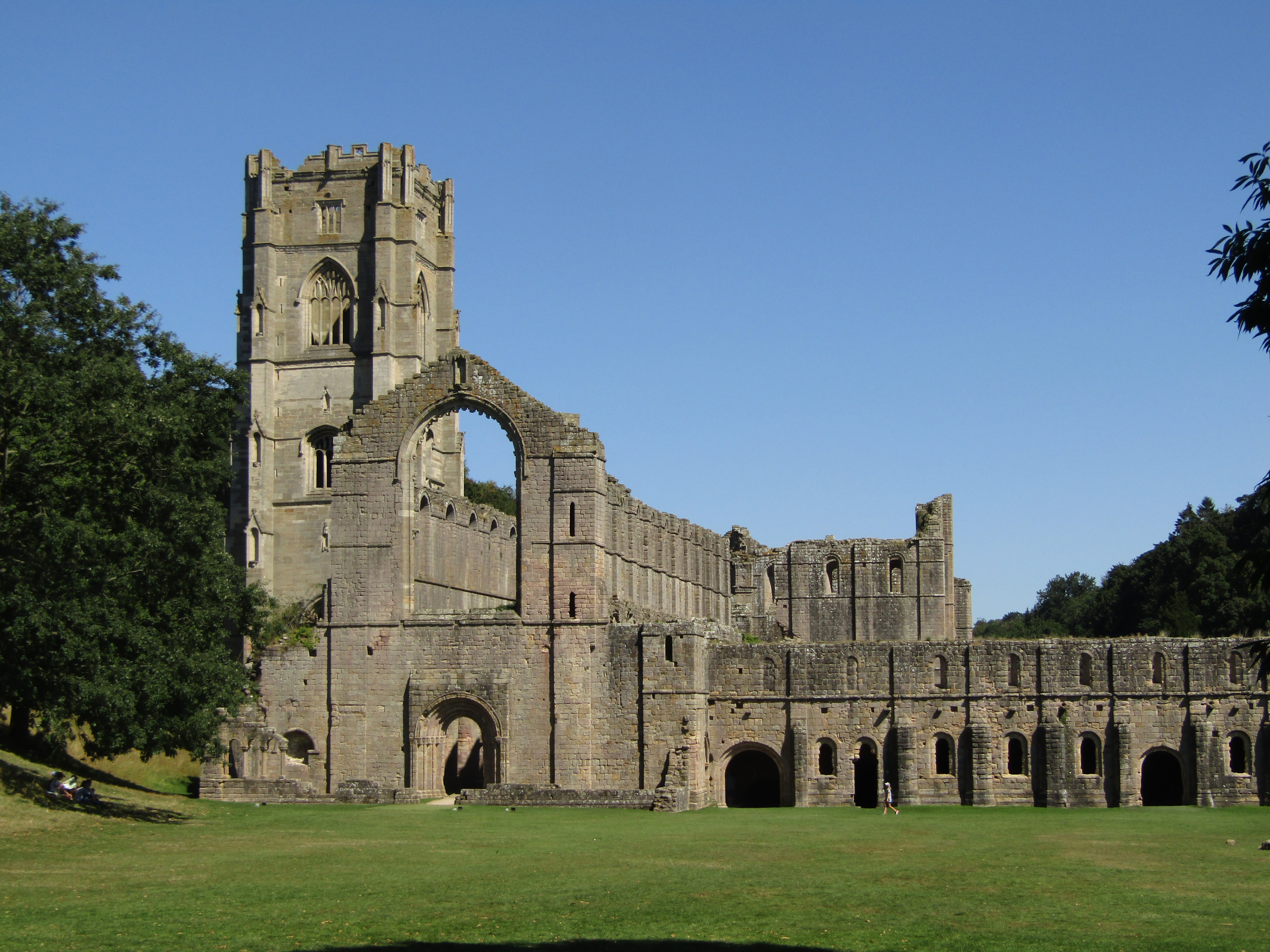
- Market Place Ripon Cathedral Cabmen's Shelter Newby Hall Fountains Abbey

- Coat of arms

- Location within North Yorkshire
- Population: 16,589 (2021 census)
- OS grid reference: SE312714
  - London: 227 mi (365 km) SSE
- Civil parish: Ripon
- Unitary authority: North Yorkshire
- Ceremonial county: North Yorkshire
- Region: Yorkshire and the Humber
- Country: England
- Sovereign state: United Kingdom
- Areas of the city: List: Bridge Hewick; Hutton Conyers; Littlethorpe; North Lees; Sharow; Studley Roger
- Post town: RIPON
- Postcode district: HG4
- Dialling code: 01765
- Police: North Yorkshire
- Fire: North Yorkshire
- Ambulance: Yorkshire
- UK Parliament: Skipton & Ripon
- Website: www.ripon.org

Ripon (/ˈrɪpən/) is a cathedral city and civil parish in North Yorkshire, England. It is located at the confluence of two tributaries of the River Ure, the Laver and Skell.

The city was originally known as Inhrypum. Bede records that Alhfrith, king of the Southern Northumbrian kingdom of Deira, gave land at Ripon to Eata of Hexham to build a monastery and the abbot transferred some of his monks there, including a young Saint Cuthbert who was guest-master at Ripon abbey. Both Bede in his Life of Cuthbert and Eddius Stephanus in his Life of Wilfred state that when Eata was subsequently driven out by Alhfrith, the abbey was given to Saint Wilfrid who replaced the timber church with a stone built church. This was during the time of the Anglian kingdom of Northumbria, a period during which it enjoyed prominence in religious importance in Great Britain. It was for a period under Viking control, and later suffered under the Normans. After a brief period of building projects under the Plantagenets, the city emerged with a prominent wool and cloth industry. Ripon became well known for its production of spurs during the 16th and 17th centuries, but would later remain largely unaffected by the Industrial Revolution.

Ripon is the third-smallest city in England and the smallest in Yorkshire, by population. At the 2021 United Kingdom census it had a population of 16,589, a decrease from the 2011 population of 16,702.

It is located 11 miles (18 km) south-west of Thirsk, 16 miles (26 km) south of Northallerton and 12 miles (19 km) north of Harrogate. As well as its racecourse and cathedral, Ripon is a tourist destination because of its proximity to the UNESCO World Heritage Site that consists of the Studley Royal Park and Fountains Abbey.

== History ==
=== Northumbrian and Viking period ===
During its prehistory the area which later became Ripon was under the control of the Brigantes, a Brythonic tribe. Three miles (5 km) north at Hutton Moor there is a large circular earthwork created by them. The Romans did not settle Ripon, but they had a military outpost around 5 miles (8 km) away at North Stainley. Solid evidence for the origins of Ripon can be traced back to the 7th century, the time of the Anglian kingdom of Northumbria. The first structure built in the area, known at the time as Inhrypum, was a Christian church dedicated to St Peter, with the settlement originating in 658. This was founded by Wilfrid, a Northumbrian nobleman, who later became Archbishop of York; he was granted the land by King Alhfrith.

The earliest settlers were stonemasons, glaziers and plasterers that Wilfrid brought over to help construct the Ripon monastery, from Lyon in Francia and Rome, which was then under Byzantine rule. The years following the death of Wilfrid are obscure in Ripon's history. After the invasion of the Great Heathen Army of Norse Vikings in Northumbria, the Danelaw was established and the Kingdom of Jórvík was founded in the Yorkshire area. In 937, Athelstan, then King of England, granted the privilege of sanctuary to Ripon, for a mile around the church. One of his successors was less well-disposed: after the Northumbrians rebelled against English rule in 948, King Edred had the buildings at Ripon burned. Prosperity was restored by the end of the 10th century, as the body of Saint Cuthbert was moved to Ripon for a while, due to the threat of Danish raids.

=== Normans and the Middle Ages ===
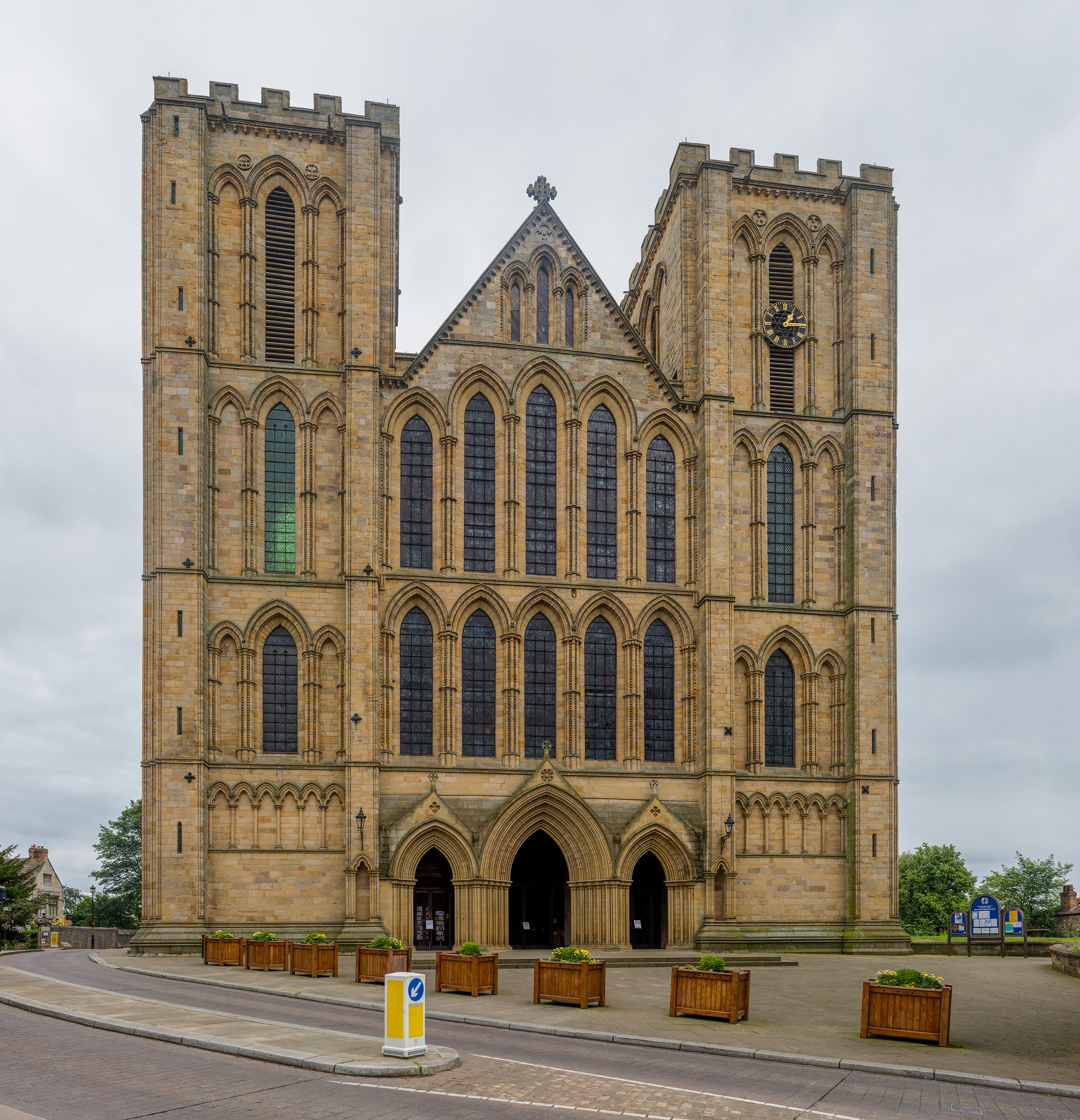
Ripon Cathedral

After the Norman conquest, much of the north rebelled in 1069, even trying to bring back Danish rule; the suppression that followed was the Harrying of the North, which resulted in the death of approximately one-third of the population of the North of England. Ripon is thought to have shrunk to a small community around the church following the suppression. The lands of the church were transferred to St Peter's Church at York as the Liberty of Ripon and it was during this time that a grand Collegiate Church was built on top of the ruins of Wilfrid's building. Eventually developed in the Gothic style, the project owed much to the work of Roger de Pont L'Evêque and Walter de Gray, two Archbishops of York during the Plantagenet era. During the 12th century Ripon built up a booming wool trade, attracting Italian trade merchants, especially Florentines, who bought and exported large quantities.

Ripon's proximity to Fountains Abbey, where the Cistercians had a long tradition of sheep farming and owned much grazing land, was a considerable advantage. After English people were forbidden from wearing foreign cloth in 1326, Ripon developed a cloth industry which was third in size in Yorkshire after York and Halifax. Due to conflict with Scotland, political emphasis was on the North during the time of Edward I and Edward II, as Scottish invaders attacked numerous northern English towns. Ripon had a wakeman to make sure the residents were safely home by curfew and law and order was maintained; however, it was forced to pay 1,000 marks to the Scots to prevent them from burning down the town on one occasion.

=== Reformation and Tudor times ===
Fountains Abbey

Ripon, which relied heavily on its religious institutions, was badly affected by the English Reformation under the Tudor king Henry VIII. The Abbot of Fountains, William Thirske, was expelled by Henry and replaced; Thirske went on to become one of the leaders of the Pilgrimage of Grace popular rising. The people of Northern England were quite traditional in their beliefs and were unhappy about Henry's intention to break with Rome; the Pilgrimage of Grace was the manifestation of this sentiment. The revolt failed and Henry followed through with the break from Rome and the Dissolution of the Monasteries, which included Fountains Abbey.

After Mary, Queen of Scots, fled Scotland to Northern England she stayed at Ripon on her journey. The mainly Catholic North supported her, and there was another popular rising known as the Rising of the North; this began six miles (10 km) away at Topcliffe and was led by Thomas Percy, the 7th Earl of Northumberland and Charles Neville, the 6th Earl of Westmorland. The rebels stayed at Ripon on 18 November 1569, but the rising eventually failed resulting in 600 people being executed, 300 of whom were hanged at Gallows Hill in Ripon during January 1570.

Plans were drawn up to make Ripon a centre of education, a University of the North, to rival Oxford and Cambridge. Although chief advisers Lord Burghley and Archbishop Sandys supported the idea, Elizabeth I did not follow it through. The scheme was revived in 1604 by Sandys' widow Cicely, under the patronage of Anne of Denmark and Bess of Hardwick without success.

=== Civil War and Restoration ===
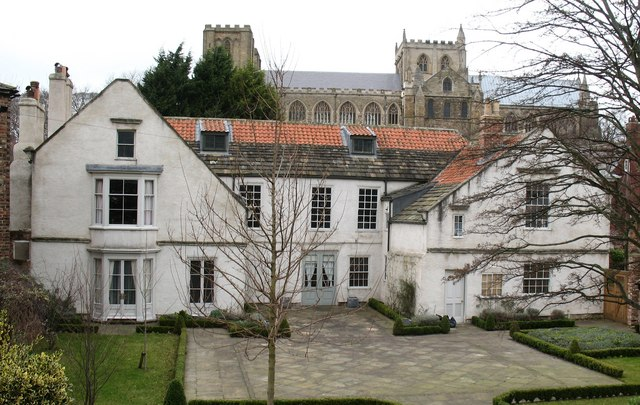
The house where Stuart King James I stayed in 1617

Ripon replaced its old textiles industry with one for the manufacture of spurs during the 16th century. They were so widely known that they gave rise to the proverb "as true steel as Ripon Rowels". At the time, spurs did not just serve as functional riding accessories, they were also fashionable; an expensive pair was made for King James I when he stayed at Ripon in 1617. It was James who granted Ripon a Royal Charter in 1604 and created the first Mayor of Ripon. After the Bishops' Wars in Scotland, a treaty was signed at Ripon in 1640 to stop the conflict between Charles I and the Scottish Covenanters. Although Ripon was not in the main line of fighting which was to the east, it remained loyal and royalist during the English Civil War. There was an incident in 1643, when parliamentarian forces under Thomas Mauleverer entered Ripon and damaged the Minster, but John Mallory and the royalist forces soon settled the matter after a skirmish in the Market Place. The royalists were eventually defeated in the Civil War and Charles I spent two nights as a prisoner in Ripon. Oliver Cromwell visited the city twice on his way to battle, once on the way to the Preston and also on the way to the Battle of Worcester.

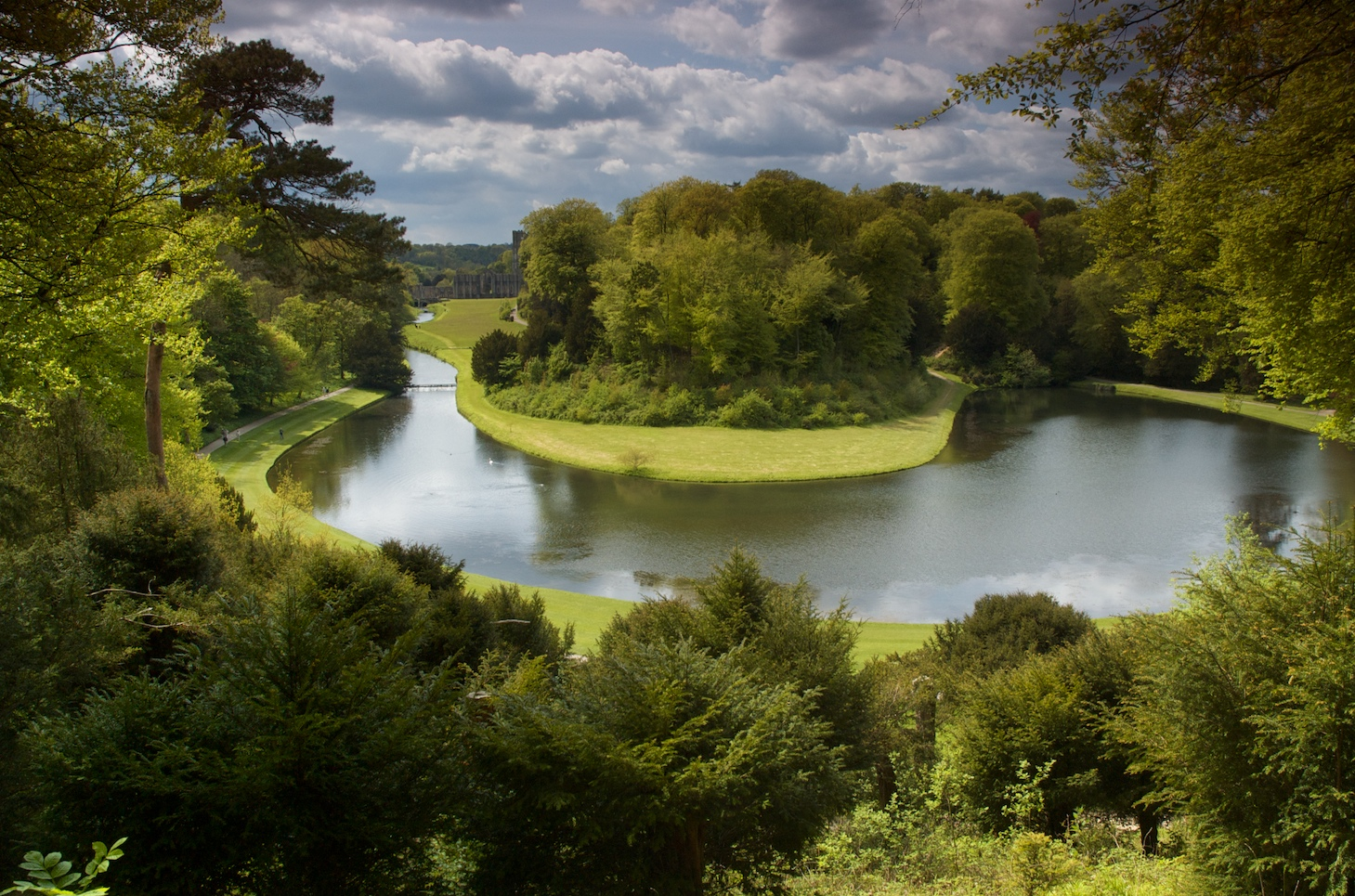
Studley Royal Park

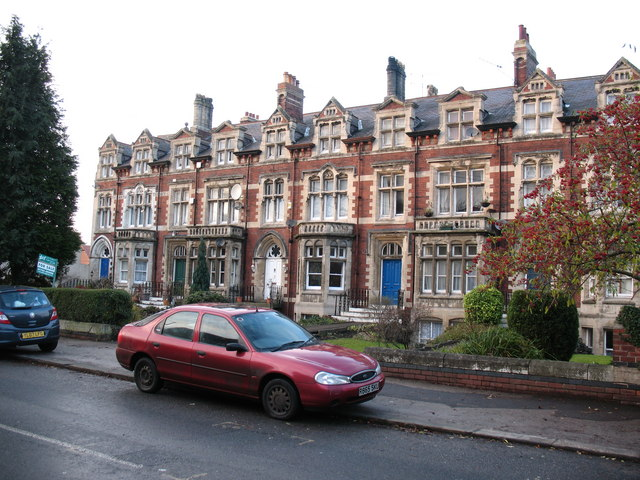
Freemantle Terrace

By the time of the English Restoration, several strains of non-conformist Christian practices had appeared, although they were not common in Ripon, the majority of people being Anglicans with a Catholic minority. After the Revolution of 1688, which overthrew James II, there were Jacobite risings in the British Isles; some Riponmen were jailed in February 1746 upon "suspicion of corresponding with Prince Charles Edward Stuart". The founder of Methodism, John Wesley, preached in Ripon and a small community of followers was established. During the Georgian era Ripon, unlike several other cities, was not significantly affected by the Industrial Revolution despite the existence of various guilds. Although more widely known for his activities outside of Ripon, John Aislabie, during his time as Member of Parliament for Ripon, created the Studley Royal Park with its water garden and erected the Ripon Obelisk (designed by Nicholas Hawksmoor). Newby Hall was also created during this period by Christopher Wren.

=== Modern day ===
Communications were improved with the opening of Ripon railway station in May 1848 situated in Ure Bank. During the First World War, a large military training camp was built in Ripon; the local community offered hospitality not only to soldiers' wives but to the Flemish refugees who became part of Ripon's community. The racecourse south-east of the city also served as an airfield (RFC Ripon) for the Royal Flying Corps (and latterly, the Royal Air Force). The racecourse was also used as a demobilisation centre for troops returning from France well into 1919.

The town had a similar though smaller role during the Second World War and, in recognition of this, the Royal Engineers were presented with the Freedom of the City in 1947. Since the War, Ripon has gone through some remodelling and has grown in size; it attracts thousands of tourists each year who come to see its famous buildings with their long Christian heritage, nearby Studley Park, Ripon Racecourse, and in recent times the theme park Lightwater Valley.

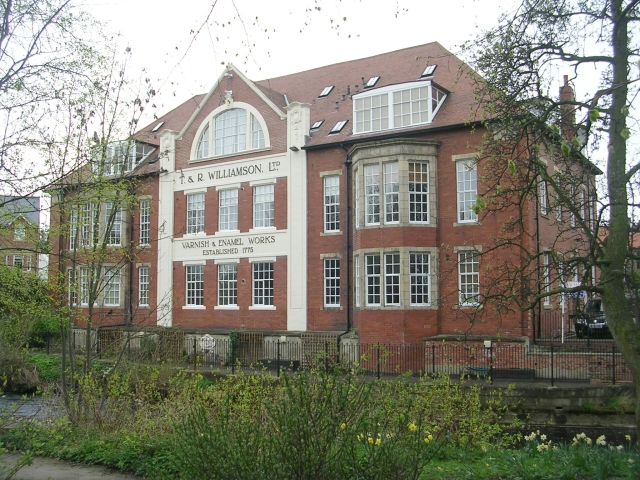
The T & R Williamson Ltd Varnish and Enamel Works

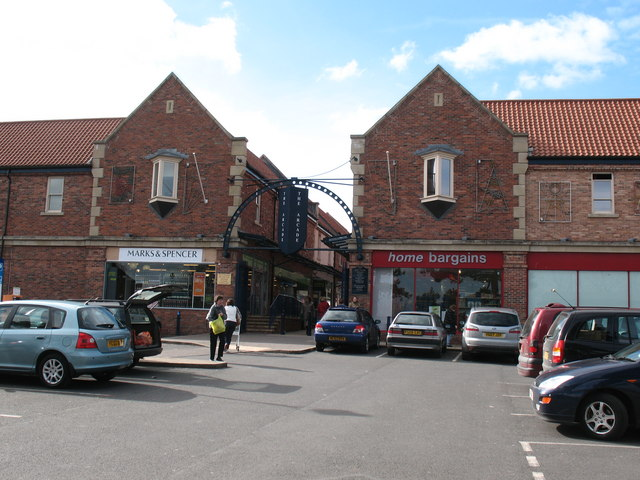
The Arcade shopping centre

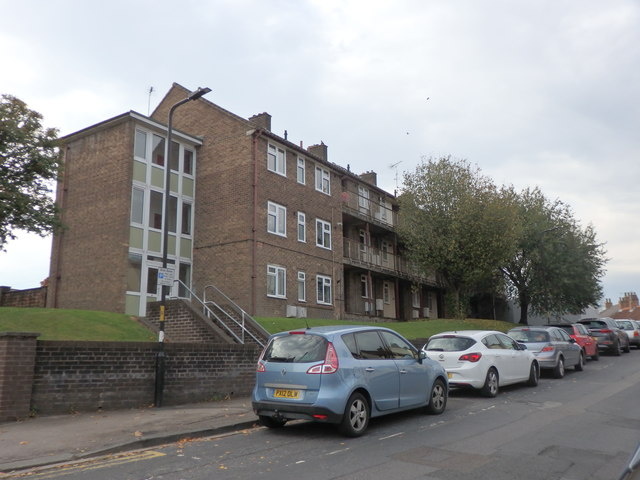
Apartment building on Allhallowgate

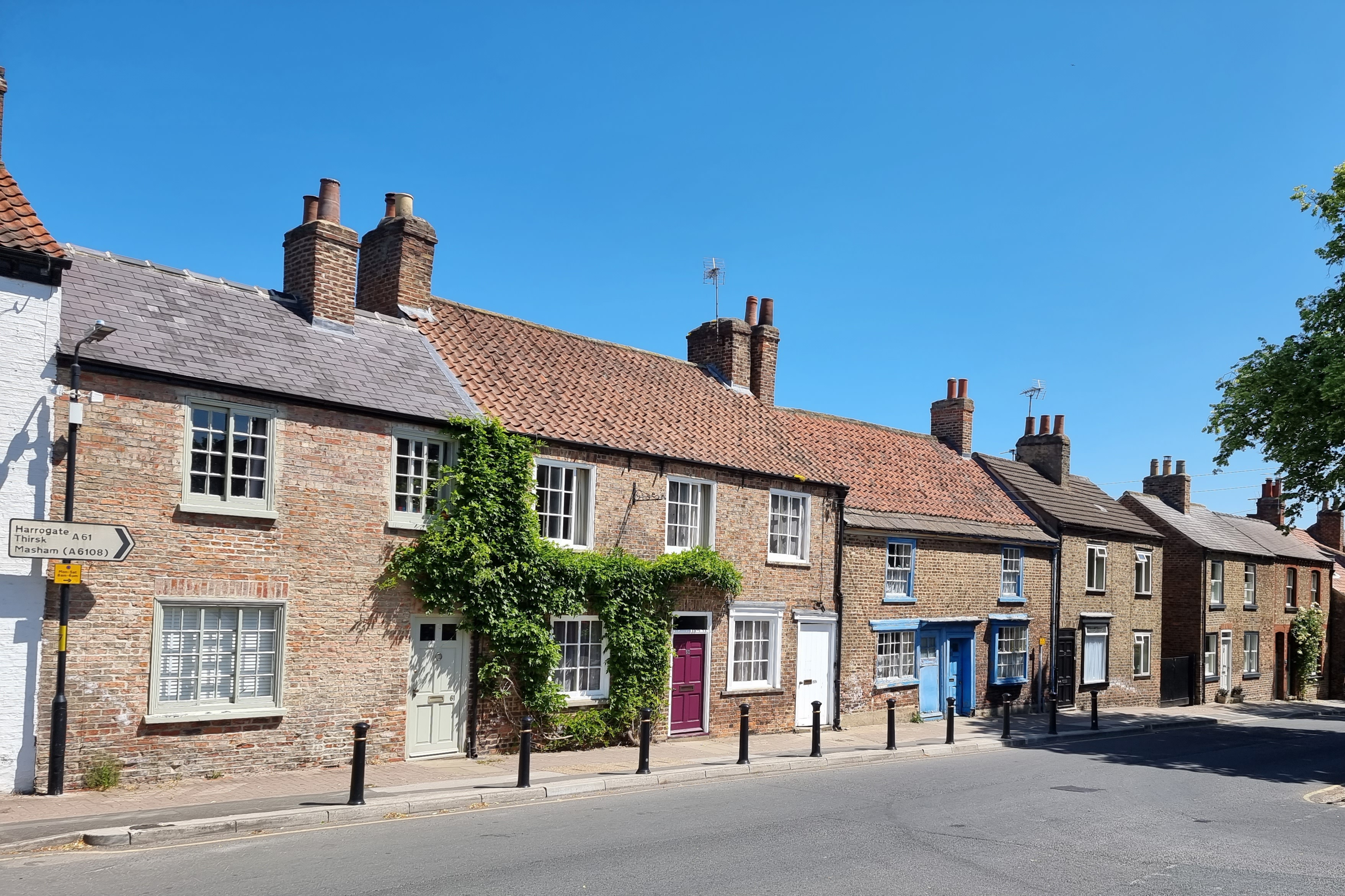
Historic Allhallowgate June 2023

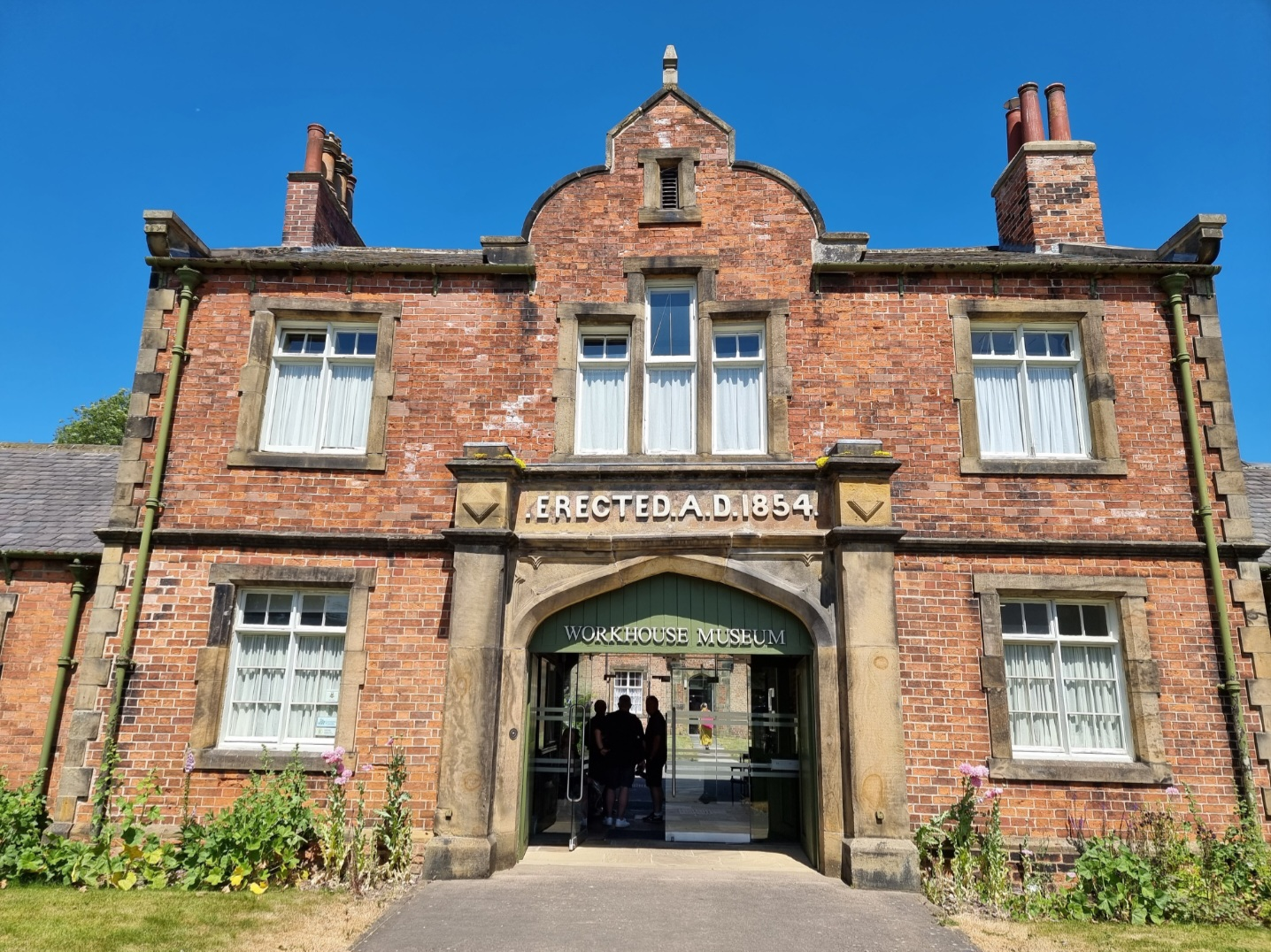
Ripon Workhouse Museum

== City status ==
Ripon and city boundary

Ripon was the first Church of England diocese to be created after the English Reformation, as it was recognised that existing dioceses were unsuited for the large increases in population caused particularly by the Industrial Revolution of the 18th century in central England. It was deemed that new cathedral building on a national scale was not viable and so Ripon, containing a high status parish church, was created from the existing Chester and York dioceses in 1836, with the building promoted to cathedral status. Ripon council presumed this had elevated the town to the rank of city, and started referring to itself as such. The next diocese Manchester was promoted similarly, but doubts as to its use of the title were raised. With the subsequent clearer understanding of needing to petition the monarch, Manchester did so and obtained the status in 1853. Ripon was encouraged to follow suit, with its own status being recognised by the parliamentary City of Ripon Act in 1865.

In 1974, Ripon borough (see Governance) was abolished and a parish council established as part of wider local government reform. The award of city status is typically granted to a local authority, whose administrative area is then considered to be the formal borders of the city, the grant in this case being removed at the same time and bestowed onto the parish. By this definition, the whole parish council area of Ripon, including its settlement and surrounding rural area containing a tiny portion of the Nidderdale AONB to the north west, is considered to be the limits of the city. It contains the third lowest population of all the cities in England, however it falls to seventh place when taking the whole of the UK into consideration. Using 2011 ONS census statistics, Ripon has the third smallest city council area but the fourth lowest urban area of any city in England.

== Governance ==
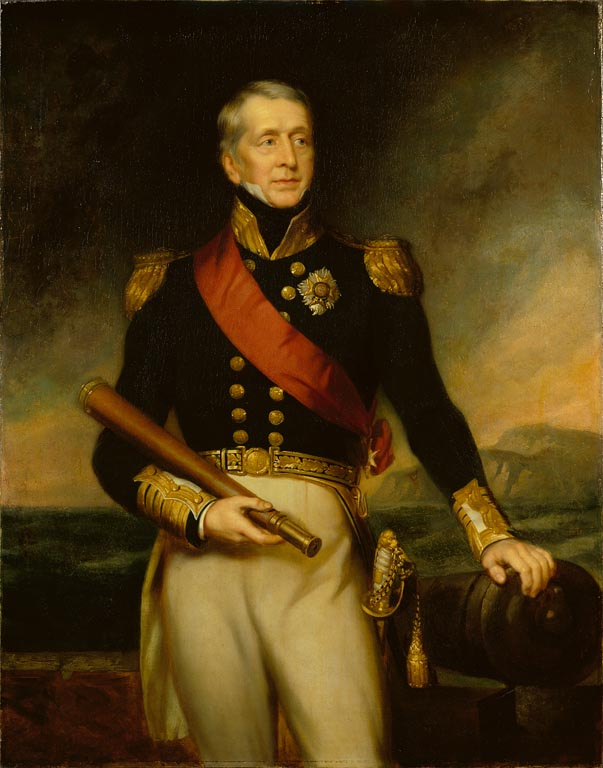
Sir George Cockburn was MP for Ripon from 1841 until 1847.

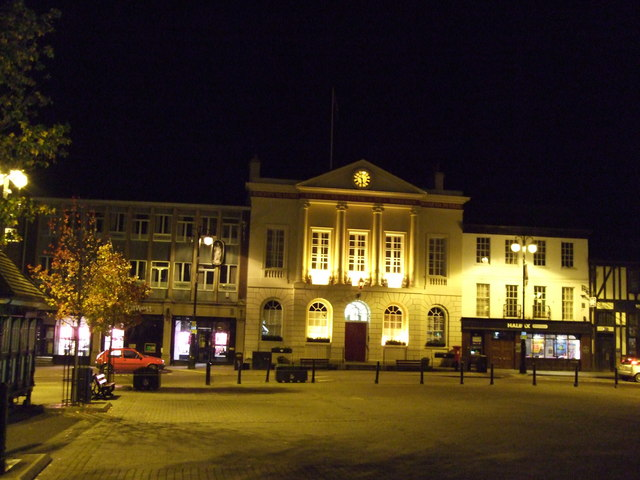
Ripon Town Hall

Ripon became a municipal borough of the West Riding of Yorkshire with its headquarters at Ripon Town Hall in 1835, and remained an independent borough until 1974. That year, following the Local Government Act 1972, the former area of Ripon borough was merged with Harrogate borough and several rural districts of the West Riding to form an enlarged Harrogate borough in the ceremonial county of North Yorkshire. It remained this way until 2023, when the Borough of Harrogate was abolished. The city is now administered by the unitary North Yorkshire Council.

The lowest tier of governance in Ripon is the Ripon City Council, a parish council with twelve members, three for each of four wards.

Ripon was represented by the Member of Parliament for Yorkshire until it had its own parliamentary borough established on a permanent basis in 1553. Ripon was able to elect two MPs to represent its parliamentary borough; the right of election was vested not in the population as a whole, but in the burgesses (originally meaning freemen of the borough or freeholders) until the Reform Act 1832. The next Reform Act, the Representation of the People Act 1867, which came into force at the 1868 election, reduced Ripon's representation from two MPs to one. Some of the more notable MPs of Ripon were John Aislabie, Frederick John Robinson and George Cockburn. The Redistribution of Seats Act 1885 abolished the borough of Ripon, but the county constituency in which the town was placed as a result was named Ripon, and this continued as a single member constituency, albeit with some boundary changes, until it was abolished before the 1983 general election. Since 1983, Ripon has been part of the Skipton and Ripon constituency, a Conservative Party stronghold. The current MP is Julian Smith, a Conservative, who was elected in 2010.

== Geography ==
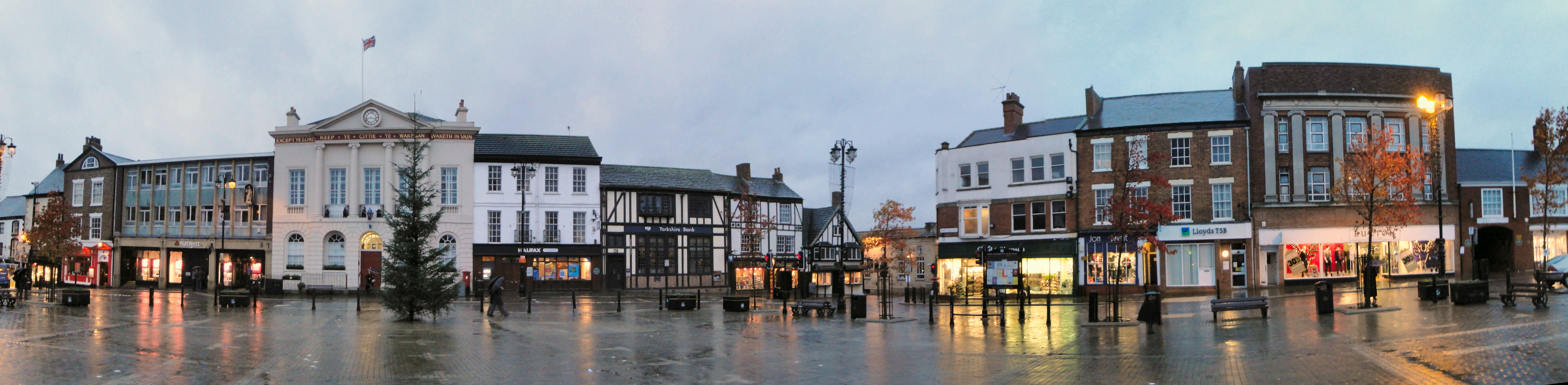
View over the market place of Ripon

=== Topography ===
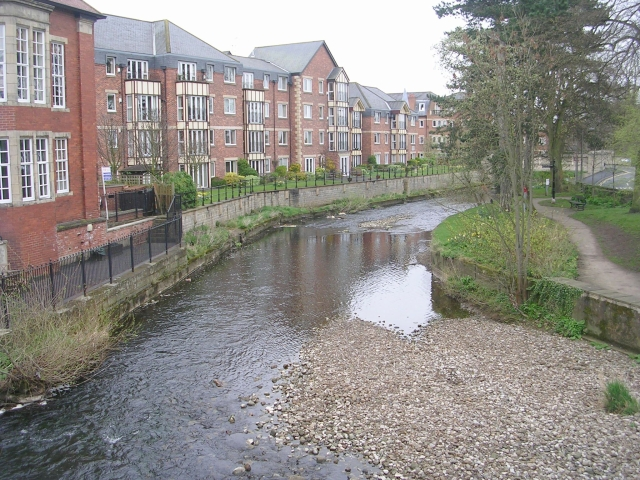
River Skell

Ripon lies at the confluence of the rivers Laver and the Skell, which meet in the west of the city. As they flow through the city, the Skell feeds water into the basin of Ripon Canal. East of the city, the Skell meets the River Ure, and both the Ure and canal head south-eastwards towards Boroughbridge. The Ure was the traditional boundary between the old West and North Ridings of Yorkshire.

As the city is at the meeting point of three rivers, it has flooded often in the 20th and 21st centuries; notable floods have occurred in 1982, 1991, 1995, 2000, 2005 and 2007. This prompted spending over £14 million on the building of flood defences for the city and a storage area upstream of the city which can hold 53,000,000 cubic feet (1,500,000 m^{3}) of water.

Much of the districts geology consists of magnesian limestone, part of the Permian rock belt that extends southwards from Darlington to Wetherby. The area has pockets of gypsum underlying the surface soils. Water has dissolved the gypsum, leaving the area prone to sinkholes, especially north of the city and on the northern side of the Ure.

=== Climate ===
The climate data below is for Topcliffe, which is 8.1 miles (13 km) to the north-east.

Climate data for Topcliffe airfield (North Yorkshire): elevation: 25 m (82 ft) Average maximum and minimum temperatures, and average rainfall recorded between 1991 and 2020 by the Met Office. Sunshine hours are for Leeming, as no data has been recorded at Topcliffe.
Month	Jan	Feb	Mar	Apr	May	Jun	Jul	Aug	Sep	Oct	Nov	Dec	Year
Mean daily maximum °C (°F)	6.8 (44.2)	7.4 (45.3)	9.9 (49.8)	12.5 (54.5)	15.7 (60.3)	18.2 (64.8)	20.9 (69.6)	20.4 (68.7)	17.7 (63.9)	13.6 (56.5)	9.5 (49.1)	6.7 (44.1)	13.3 (55.9)
Mean daily minimum °C (°F)	0.4 (32.7)	0.1 (32.2)	1.5 (34.7)	3.2 (37.8)	5.8 (42.4)	8.9 (48.0)	11.2 (52.2)	10.6 (51.1)	8.4 (47.1)	5.6 (42.1)	2.4 (36.3)	-0.0 (32.0)	4.86 (40.75)
Average precipitation mm (inches)	55.3 (2.18)	39.5 (1.56)	45.4 (1.79)	53.3 (2.10)	42.7 (1.68)	59.7 (2.35)	54.1 (2.13)	62.5 (2.46)	50.5 (1.99)	58.7 (2.31)	63.3 (2.49)	58.9 (2.32)	644 (25.4)
Average precipitation days (≥ 1.0 mm)	10.9	8.7	10	9.3	8.8	9.1	9.8	9.9	9.0	10.4	10.9	11.1	117.9
Mean monthly sunshine hours	58.1	81.7	121.5	153.8	195.0	175.9	185.5	171.2	132.7	93.4	63.7	54.2	1,486.7
Source 1: Met Office
Source 2: Met Office

== Landmarks and architecture ==
Kirkgate, a street in the old town

The main feature of Ripon is an English Gothic style cathedral, originally founded by Irish monks but refounded by Saint Wilfrid in 672. It has been rebuilt many times, and the only original building is the Saxon crypt. It is home to Wilfrid’s grave.

Ripon Spa Baths is a grade II listed building which was opened in 1905. Originally, spa water was pumped from Aldfield a village to the north of the city, but later, the baths were opened on site too. The site closed in 2021, and in 2024, it was purchased by a private buyer to be converted into a hospitality venue and luxury apartments.

== Education ==
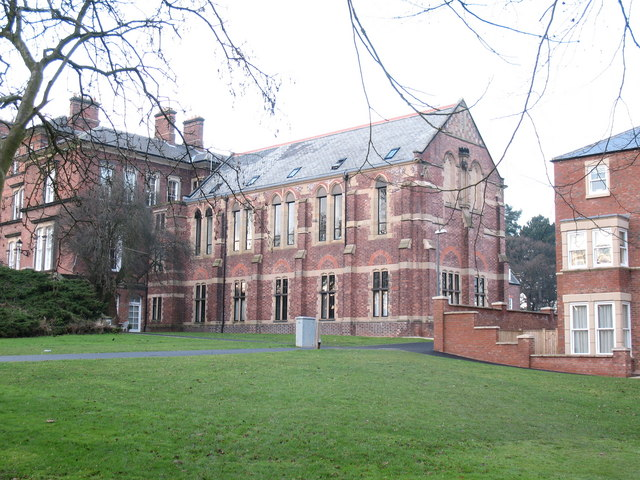
Buildings of the former College of Ripon and York St John facilities

Ripon is home to Ripon Grammar School which is a selective intake, state secondary school. The school claims to take roots from the school which was attached to the Collegiate Church, founded during the time of the Angle kingdom of Northumbria by Saint Wilfrid. The refoundation date for the school was during the reign of Queen Mary I in 1555. The school has several notable alumni, known as Old Riponians, including theologian Bishop Beilby Porteus, historian Bishop William Stubbs, fashion designer Bruce Oldfield and television presenter Richard Hammond. In the modern day the school hosts around 800 pupils, gaining engineering status in 2006, it receives favourable reports from the Ofsted, being either good or outstanding. Opposite Ripon Grammar on Clotherholme Road is the non-selective Outwood Academy Ripon (formerly Ripon College, a secondary modern school), which was also known as Ripon City School until 1999. It has around 630 pupils and is exceeding the national average of GCSE results.

On the site of the Old Ripon Racecourse in Whitcliffe Lane was St Olave's Preparatory School. This site was taken over by an independent co-ed preparatory school founded in 1960 called the Cathedral Choir School. The choir school closed in 2012 and the site has now had approval for the building of new residential dwellings. Ripon previously had higher education facilities in the form of the College of Ripon and York St John until 2001. This college had its roots in two Anglican teacher training colleges, which were founded in York in 1841 for men and 1846 for women. The women's college moved to Ripon in 1862. Over the next century, the colleges gradually diversified their education programmes. The colleges merged in 1974 to form the College of Ripon and York St John. The combined institution became a college of the University of Leeds in 1990. Between 1999 and 2001, all activities were transferred to York and the college received the name York St John University. One of York St John's buildings on its Lord Mayor's Walk campus was renamed 'Ripon' in June 2018 to commemorate Ripon Training College's "contribution to women's education" over 123 years of service.

Evolve, a small, inclusive post-16 college is based in the centre of Ripon, which works alongside Craven College, which is based in Skipton.

On the outskirts of Ripon there is the specialist autism education school called Spring Hill. The school offers day and boarding places. Current pupil numbers are 22. These include 17 boys, 5 girls, and 6 boarders. Spring Hill is owned by Cambian group PLC which is a large UK provider of specialist provision for children and adults. Spring Hill was previously in the ownership of the charity Barnardos. The current headteacher is Samantha Campbell, the head of care is Rebecca Sharp, The deputy headteacher is Christine Sherman, the head of education is currently vacant and the transitions and admissions coordinator is currently vacant.

== Religion ==
Christianity is the largest religious affiliation in Ripon; 79.3% of the people in the area polled as part of the United Kingdom Census 2001 professed the Christian faith. Ripon Cathedral is the main religious building in the city and contains a tomb said to contain the bones of Saint Wilfrid who founded a monastery here and with it the town. The Venerable William Gibson is another noted local figure, a Catholic martyr who was one of the eighty-five martyrs of England and Wales.

The Church of England is in the majority, with two parishes: the ancient Ripon Cathedral and Holy Trinity Church. Ripon was the episcopal see of the Diocese of Ripon and Leeds represented by the Bishop of Ripon and Leeds, created in 1836 with just Ripon in its title but adapted to include Leeds in 2000. In 2014 it became part of the Diocese of Leeds, with Ripon Cathedral serving as one of its three cathedrals of equal status. During the time of the kingdom of Northumbria there was a short-lived Diocese of Ripon, with Eadhedus the only bishop. There is also a Medieval chapel located on Magdalens Road, which was once part of a leper hospital. The Chapel of St Mary Magdalen is still used for regular worship and is a grade I listed building.

There is a Roman Catholic parish in Ripon called St Wilfrid's; it is covered by the Diocese of Leeds in the Harrogate deanery and the church is an architecturally significant building. There are also around two places of worship for Methodism in Ripon, as well as a couple of evangelical churches including Bethel Church and Zion Baptist Church.

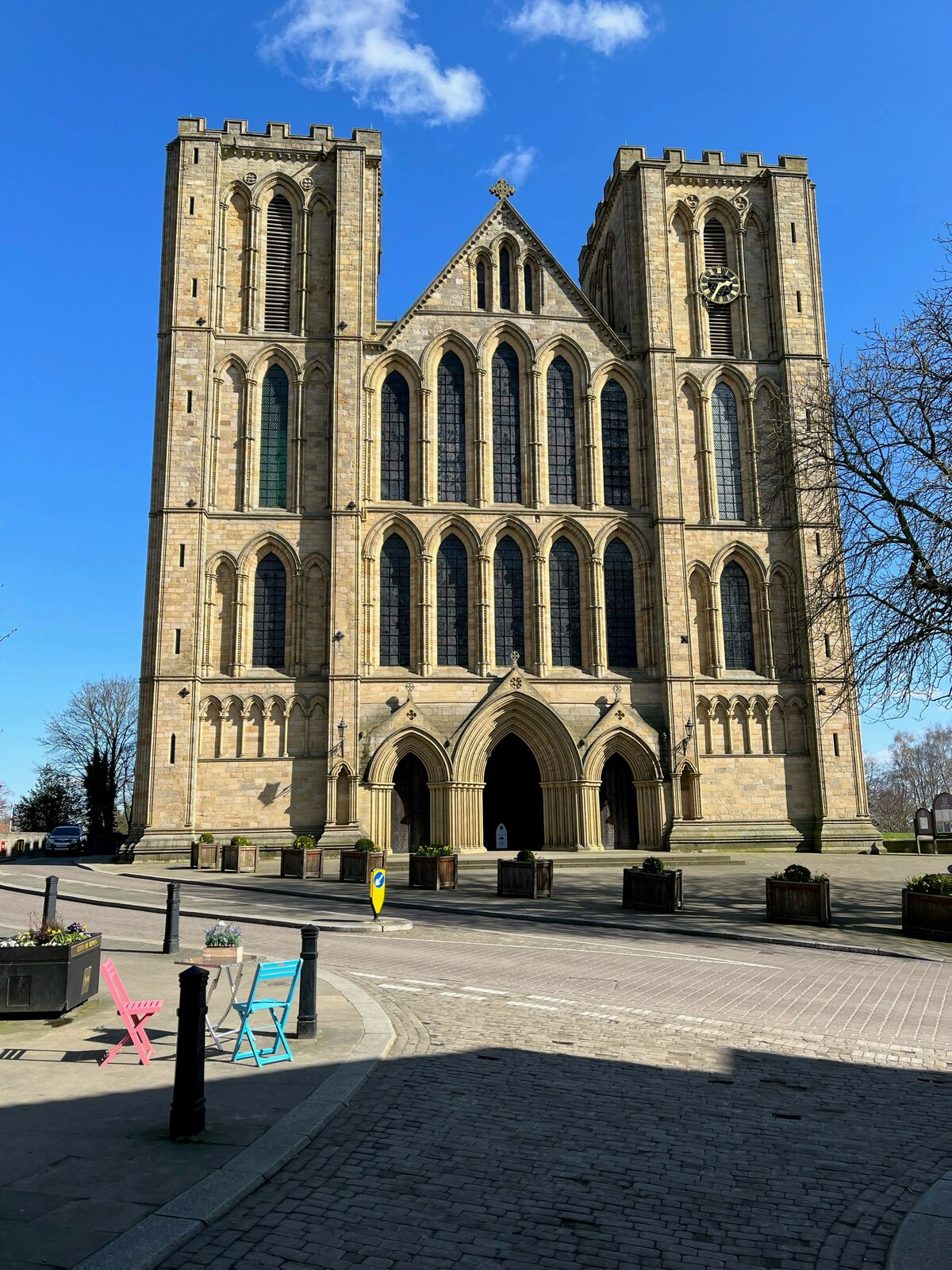
Ripon Cathedral's exterior

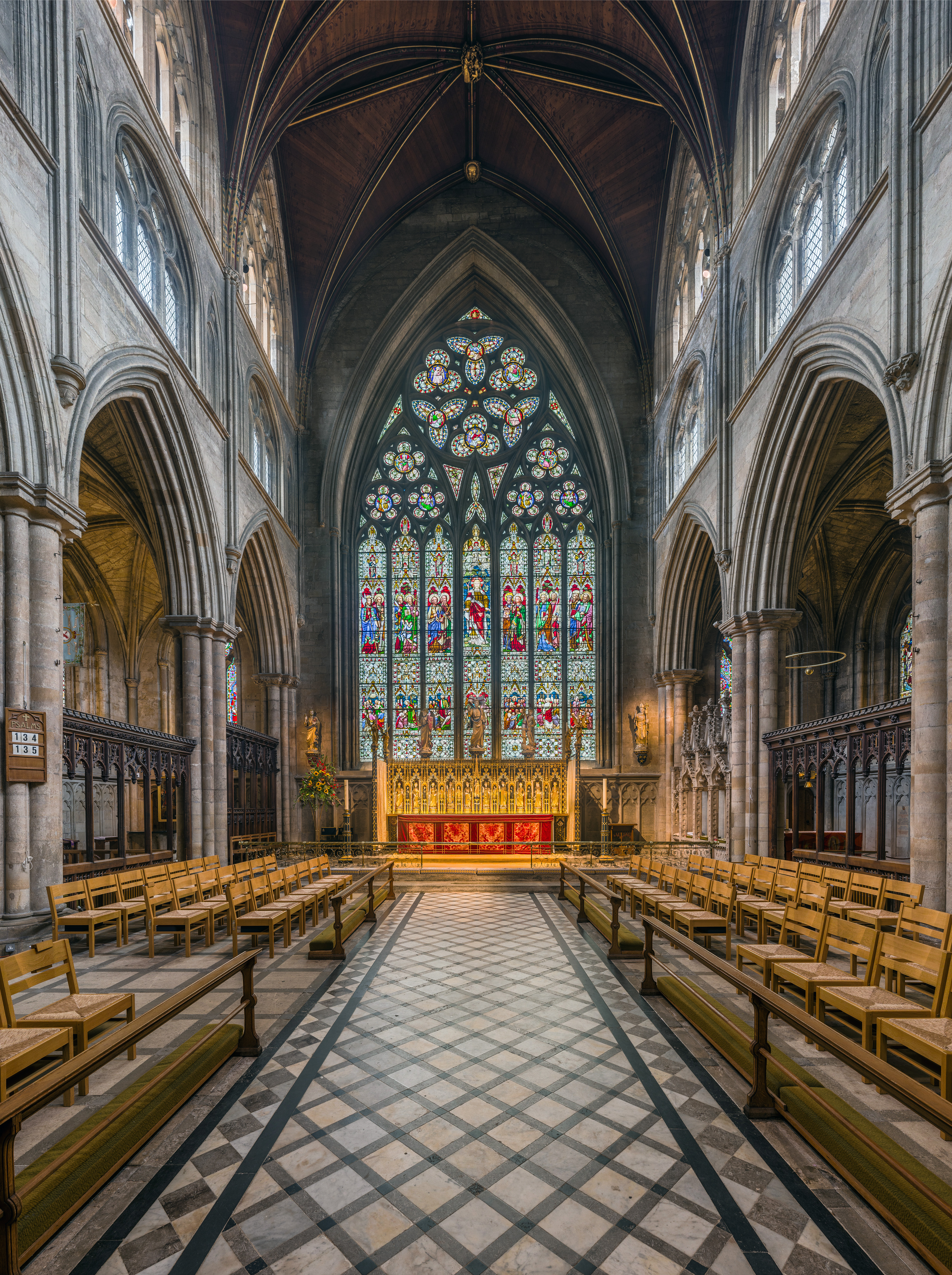
Ripon Cathedral interior

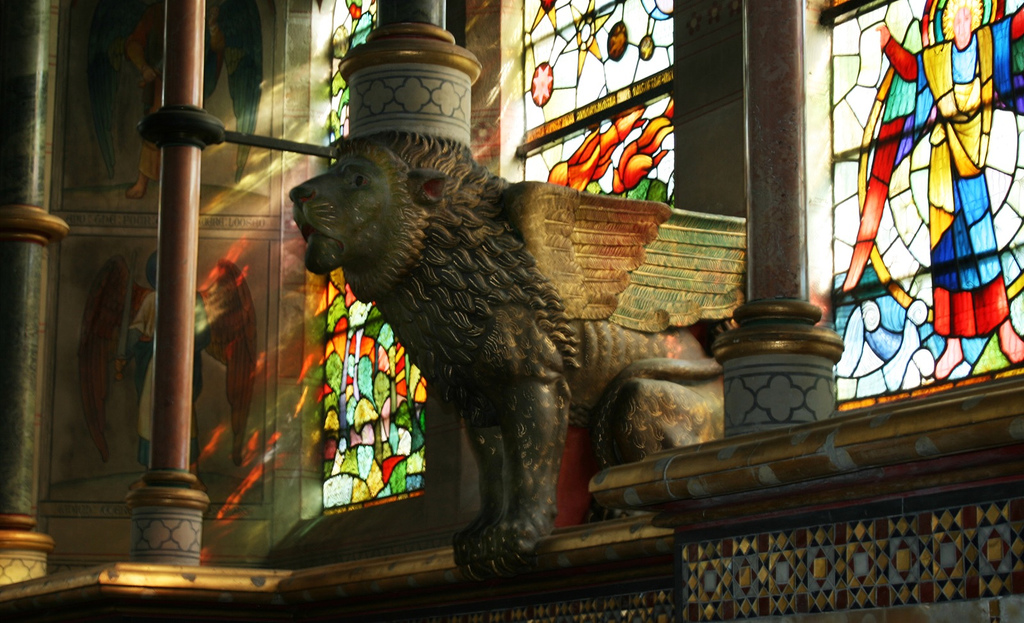
Inside St Mary's at Studley Royal

== Culture ==
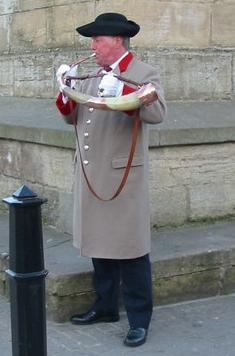
The Ripon Hornblower

Market day is held on a Thursday, and there are 120 stalls. In celebration of the city's founder the Wilfrid Procession is held every year; it originated in 1108 when King Henry I granted the privilege of holding a fair for him. At the procession there are various decorated floats which make their way through the city with locals in costume. Part of the tradition represents the return of Wilfrid to Ripon, a decorated dummy (sometimes a man in costume instead) dressed as Wilfrid is sat on a horse, accompanied by two musicians with another man carrying St Wilfrid's hat around. Ripon also has dancing traditions such as the Long Sword dance and Morris dance.

Ripon Obelisk

The market square is the site of the Ripon Obelisk, erected in 1702 by John Aislabie and designed by Nicholas Hawksmoor. It stands 80 ft (24 m) in height and is capped with a weathervane bearing a representation of the wakeman's horn. It is Grade I listed and reputed to be the oldest in England.

The tradition of the Ripon Hornblower has endured since 886 and continues on to this day. It originates with the wakeman of Ripon, whose job in the Middle Ages was similar to that of a mayor, although he had more responsibilities in the keeping of law and order. Every day at 9:00 pm the horn is blown at the four corners of the obelisk in Ripon Market. The horn has become the symbol of the city and represents Ripon on the Harrogate borough coat of arms. There are three museums in Ripon collectively known as the Yorkshire Law and Order Museums; it includes the Courthouse Museum, the Prison & Police Museum and the Workhouse Museum.

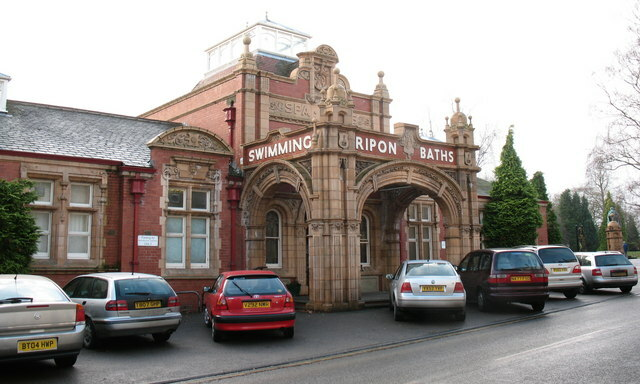
Ripon Baths

=== Sport ===
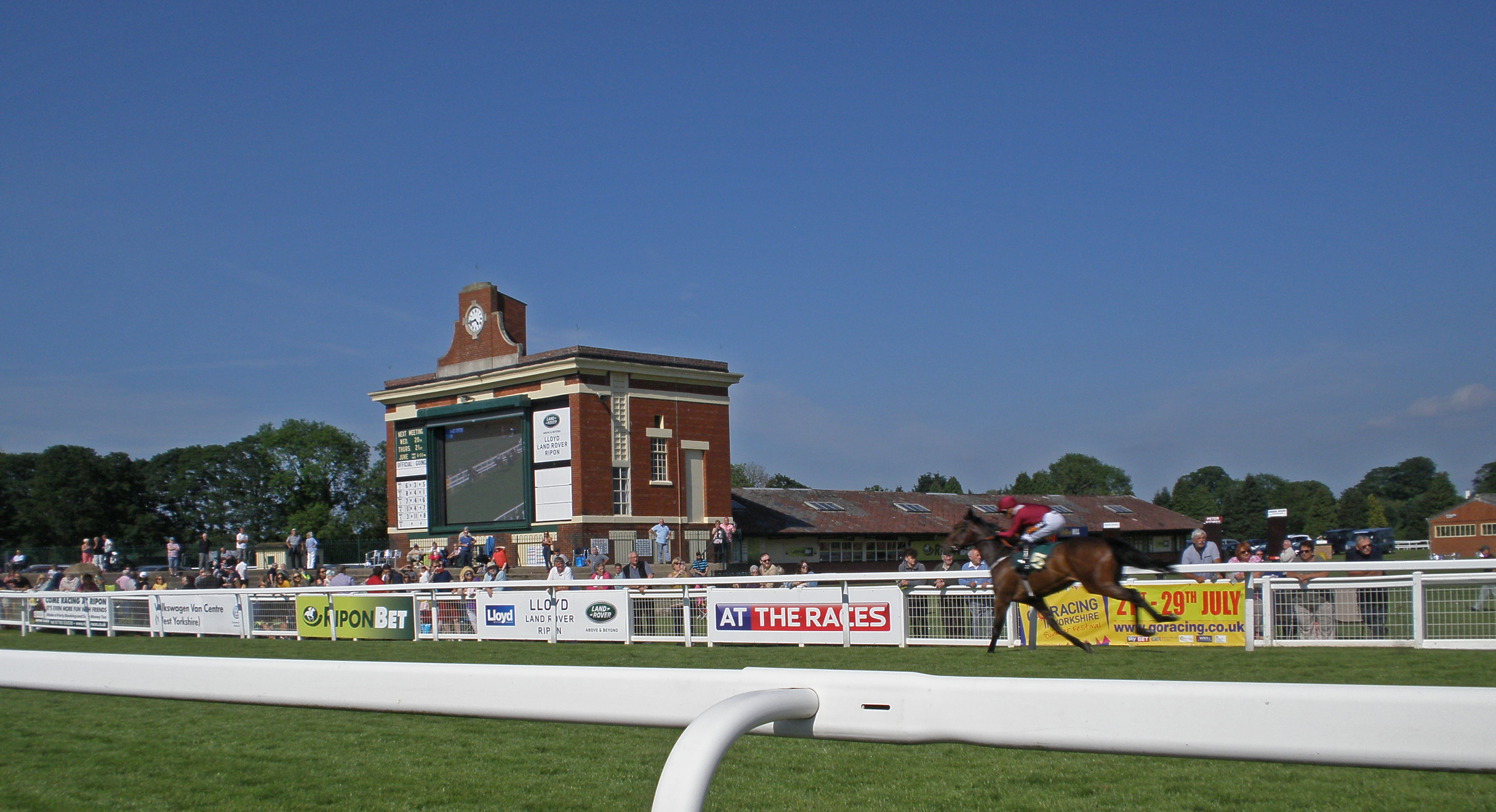
Ripon Racecourse

In terms of sport, the most noted field of participation is horse racing with the Ripon Racecourse. The sport has a long history in Ripon, with the first recorded meeting on Bondgate Green in 1664, while its current location has been used as a racetrack since 1900. Ripon staged Britain's first race for female riders in 1723. The city is also home to Ripon Rugby Union Football Club who were founded in 1886 and currently play in Yorkshire 2, the eighth tier of the English Rugby Union league.

Ripon City AFC, formed in 1898 represent the City in association football in the West Yorkshire Football League and play at Mallorie Park.

=== Media ===
Local news and television programmes are provided by BBC Yorkshire and BBC North East and Cumbria on BBC One & ITV Yorkshire and ITV Tyne Tees on ITV1. Television signals can be received from either Emley Moor or Bilsdale TV transmitters.

Local radio stations are BBC Radio York, Greatest Hits Radio Yorkshire (formerly Stray FM), 'Your Harrogate' (which broadcast from Harrogate) and BFBS (which provides radio programmes for His Majesty's Armed Forces).

The Ripon Gazette is the town’s weekly local newspaper.

=== In popular culture ===
A character in Downton Abbey refers to becoming a partner in a Ripon firm of solicitors. The historical drama also refers to the nearby towns of Easingwold and Thirsk.

== Transport ==
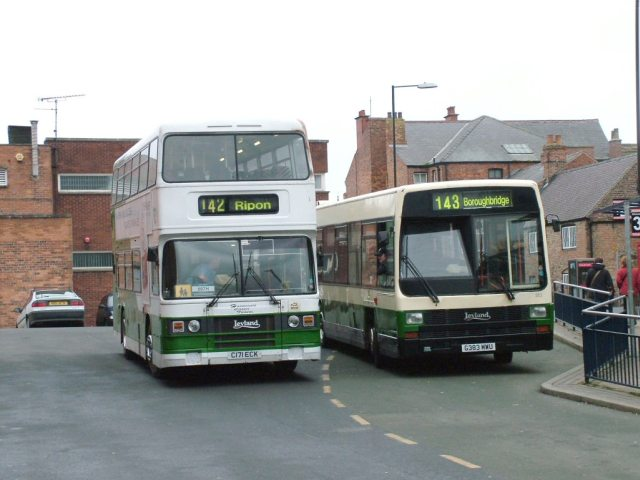
Ripon Bus Station

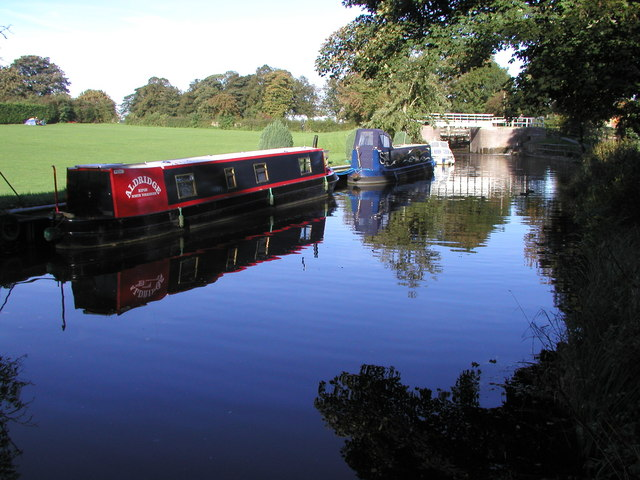
The Ripon Canal continues to be used by barges in the modern day.

=== Railway ===
The city was previously served by Ripon railway station on the Leeds-Northallerton Line that ran between Leeds and Northallerton. It was once part of the North Eastern Railway and then London & North Eastern Railway. The Ripon to Harrogate Line was closed in the 1960s as part of the Beeching cuts. Today, much of the route of the line through the city is now a relief road and although the former station still stands, it is now surrounded by a new housing development. The issue remains a significant one in local politics and there are movements wanting to restore the line. Reports suggest the reopening of a line between Ripon and Harrogate would be economically viable, costing £40 million and initially attracting 1,200 passengers a day, rising to 2,700.

=== Road ===
By road, Ripon is well connected; it is accessible from the north and south via the A1(M) motorway, which connects to Ripon by the B6265. Ripon is accessible from the east and west via the A61, the main road running through the city.

=== Bus ===
Harrogate Bus Company's route 36 links the city to Harrogate and Leeds and there are also regular, albeit infrequent, bus services to Boroughbridge, York, Thirsk, Northallerton, Leyburn, Richmond and others.

=== Canal ===
The Ripon Canal was proposed by John Smeaton in 1766, to connect the city centre to part of the River Ure; it was used for transporting coal from the Durham coalfields into the city. Although it was abandoned in 1956, a conservationist campaign saw it partly reopened in 1988 and fully in 1996.

== Town twinning ==
- Foix in south-west France 1957.

== Freedom of the City ==
The following people and military units have received the Freedom of the City of Ripon:

=== Individuals ===
- Charles, Prince of Wales: 24 October 2002.

=== Military units ===
- The Royal Engineers: 27 July 1949.
- RAF Leeming: 14 September 2015.

== See also ==
- Marquess of Ripon
- Listed buildings in Ripon
- Quarry Moor nature reserve
- Sanctuary Way Walk
- Ure Viaduct
