= Gawthorpe =

Gawthorpe may refer to:

- Gawthorpe, Kirklees, a hamlet near Huddersfield, West Yorkshire, England
- Gawthorpe, Wakefield an area of Ossett, in the Wakefield district, West Yorkshire, England
- Gawthorpe (ward), a UK electoral ward covering Padiham, Lancashire, England
- Gawthorpe Hall, an Elizabethan house in Padiham, Lancashire, England
- Mary Gawthorpe (1881–1973), British suffragette
