= Church of St Thomas the Apostle, Killinghall =

- St Thomas the Apostle Parish Church
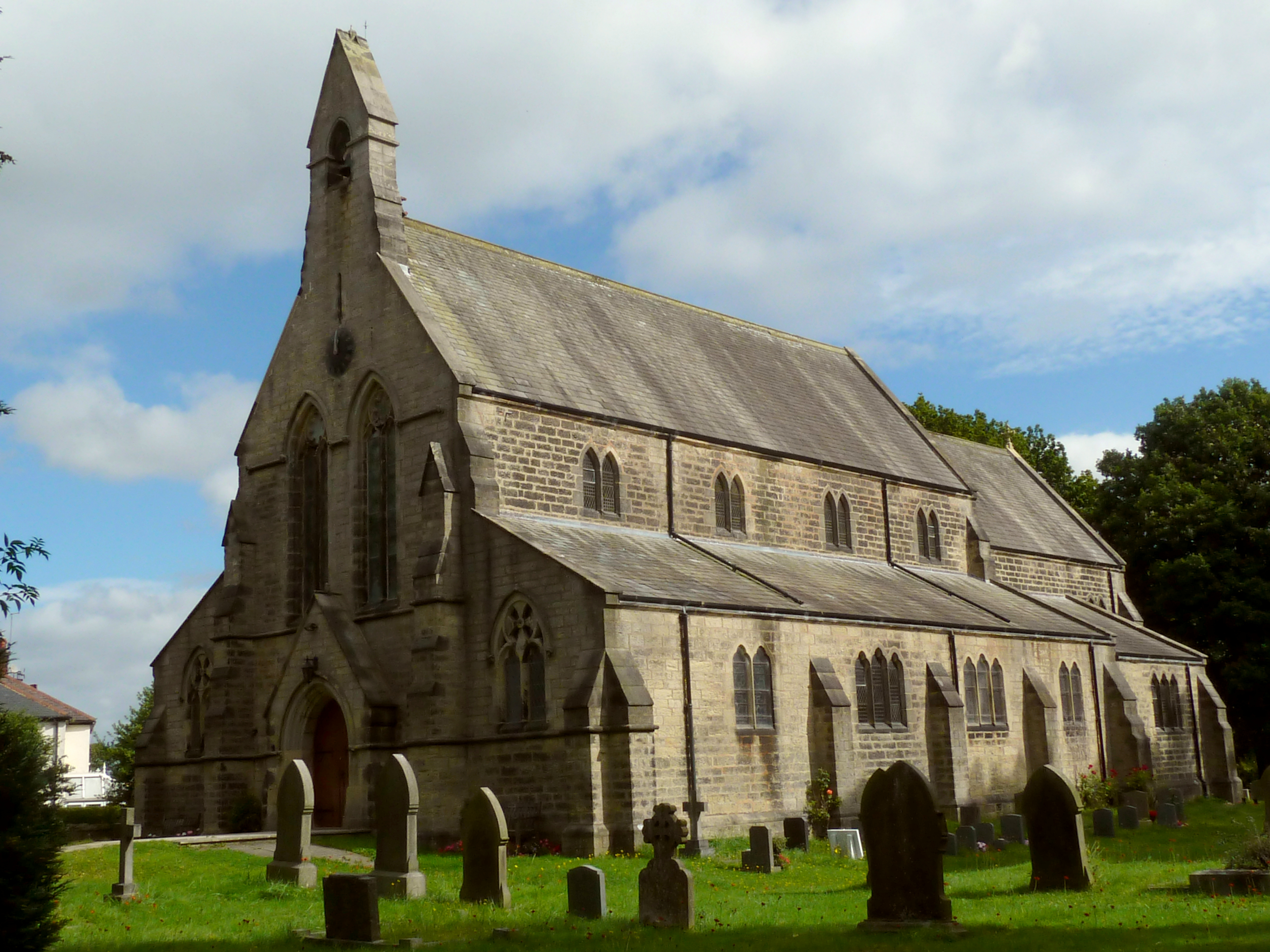
- St Thomas the Apostle, 2016

- Location within North Yorkshire
- 54°1′18″N 1°33′59″W
- OS grid reference: SE286584
- Location: Killinghall, North Yorkshire
- Country: England
- Denomination: Church of England
- Churchmanship: Central
- Website: stthomasabeckethampsthwaite.org.uk

History
- Status: Parish church
- Founded: 26 April 1879
- Dedication: Thomas the Apostle
- Dedicated: 29 July 1880
- Consecrated: 29 July 1880

Architecture
- Functional status: Active
- Heritage designation: Unlisted
- Architectural type: Parish church
- Style: Gothic Revival architecture

Administration
- Diocese: Ripon and Leeds
- Archdeaconry: Richmond and Craven (465)
- Deanery: Harrogate (46503)
- Parish: Ecclesiastical parish of Killinghall

Clergy
- Vicar: The Revd Christella Helen Wilson

The Church of St Thomas the Apostle, Killinghall, is an Anglican parish church in Killinghall, North Yorkshire, England. It was designed in 1879 by William Swinden Barber when the parish of Ripley was split to create the additional parish of Killinghall, and a new building was required to accommodate a growing congregation. It was opened in 1880. Among the early vicars posted in this benefice were two canons, Sydney Robert Elliston and Lindsay Shorland-Ball, and the Venerable Robert Collier, an Irish missionary who served in India and Africa.

== Context, funding and founding ==
Before St Thomas' was built, the Anglicans of Killinghall were obliged to walk 1.2 miles (1.9 km) to Ripley church every Sunday, making attendance difficult for the elderly and infirm. In latter years the schoolroom at Killinghall was licensed for public worship, but as the Bishop of Ripon said, "There were not those influences about it which belonged to a consecrated building."

In the 1870s the village of Killinghall, in the parish of Ripley, was increasing in size, and by 1879 had a population of 6,200 who needed a church closer than the one at Ripley. Killinghall consequently became a separate parish. The endowment for this parish came from the sale of a glebe farm at Ripley. More than an acre of land for the church and its approaches was donated by Dr and Mrs Beaumont of Knaresborough, and donations were given by local landowners and friends of the project. This allowed the church committee to plan a vicarage also. Beaumont later agreed to sell the adjoining two acres of land to the committee for £200, and this was earmarked for the burial ground. The committee received a grant of £1,500 from the Ecclesiastical Commissioners, and expected to have to raise £3,000 for a church building to accommodate 400–500 persons, and £1,500 for the vicarage. However, in return for the vicarage grant, the new vicar Reverend R.K. Smith had to pay the Commissioners £214 per annum. This sum equalled the whole of his stipend, apart from the use of the vicarage which was not yet built. On Thursday, Friday and Saturday 28–30 August 1879, a bazaar was held under the auspices of Miss Ingilby of Ripley Castle, to raise over £300 towards the cost of the church. This event was designed to attract the gentry of Harrogate, who arrived in large numbers by carriage.

By July 1880, the cost of the church building had risen to over £4,000, raised by subscription and fundraising. By 1930, the value of the building was estimated at £14,000, and by 1980 the value was £400,000.

== Building ==
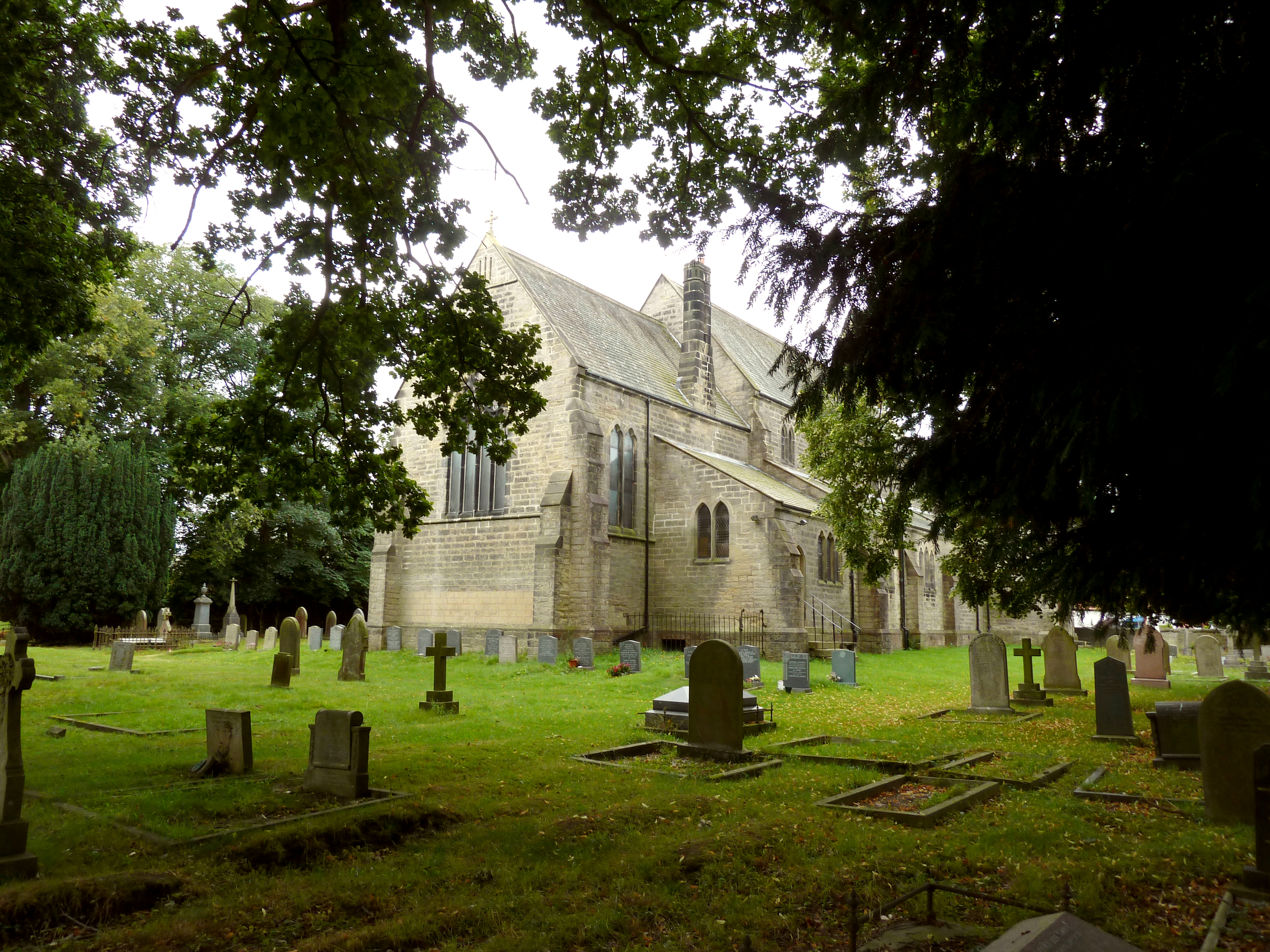
North-east corner

The foundation stone was laid on Saturday 26 April 1879 by Sir Henry Day Ingilby of Ripley Castle, witnessed by an audience of 300.

The church was designed in the style of the second or Curvinilear Period of Decorated Gothic of 1290 to 1350. Due to cost, the decoration of capitals and vaulting are minimal or non-existent, but there is some tracery in the windows, and varied carved finials under some arches. The church is built of dressed ashlar blocks of Killinghall stone, while the boundary wall, also built in 1880, has contrasting rough coping to blend with the contemporary local style. The west wall faces the highway, and has two aisle-end, two-light windows, whose tracery is in the form of a Canterbury cross. The North Porch is surmounted by a St Thomas Cross. The remaining windows of the church have trefoil lights or are plain lancets, except for the east window which has four lights. The north porch is 8.5 feet (2.6 m) square, and faced what was then the most populous part of the village. However the porch was converted into a lavatory around 2015.

The mason was James Simpson of Harrogate, who constructed several local buildings of stone from Killinghall quarry, including the adjacent Methodist Chapel (1869). According to Killinghall historian Colin Waite, "It could well be that James used the same stone to build St Thomas's," and the Pateley Bridge and Nidderdale Herald's 1880 article about the consecration said that it was local stone. James Simpson was the father of David Simpson, who was mayor of Harrogate four times, who built Harrogate's Grand Hotel (1903), and who developed Harrogate's Duchy Estate for the Duchy of Lancaster. The carpenter and joiner was William Bellerby of York. Mr Baynes of Ripon was the slater, and Mr Fortune of Harrogate was the plasterer. John Naylor of Halifax was the plumber and glazier. The painters were Hirst and Barraclough of Brighouse. Mr Rawe of Ripley was clerk of the works. The value of work and materials as of 1880 was around £3,000.

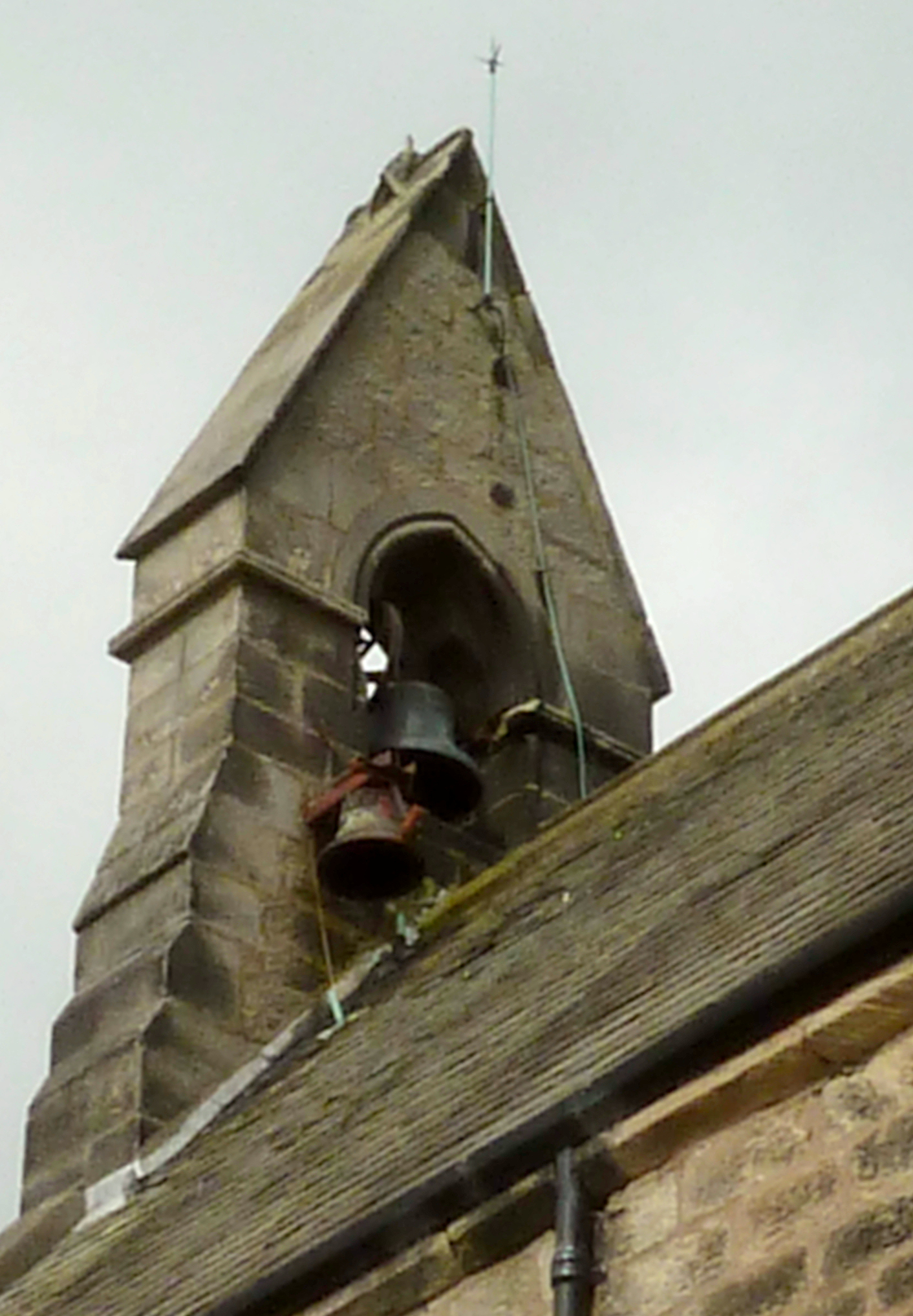
The bells

=== Bells and clock ===
The bellcote contains two bells. The larger one, original to the church and measuring 20 inches (51 cm), was founded in 1879 by Mears and Stainbank. It is hung for use with a bellrope, being in its original position within the bellcote, with a full metal wheel. The smaller one is connected to the clock, which as of 2016 was awaiting repair. This bell measures 14 inches (36 cm) and was founded by John Taylor of Loughborough, possibly in the 1930s when the turret clock mechanism was installed. It has been added at a lower level on the east side of the bellcote, and is struck by a clock hammer. Both bells are inscribed with the maker's name, and the larger one has the date 1879. The clock bell, clock face and turret mechanism by Potts of Leeds was donated by the daughters of George Lewis, who died aged 91 in 1932, having served as churchwarden for 41 years.

=== Interior ===
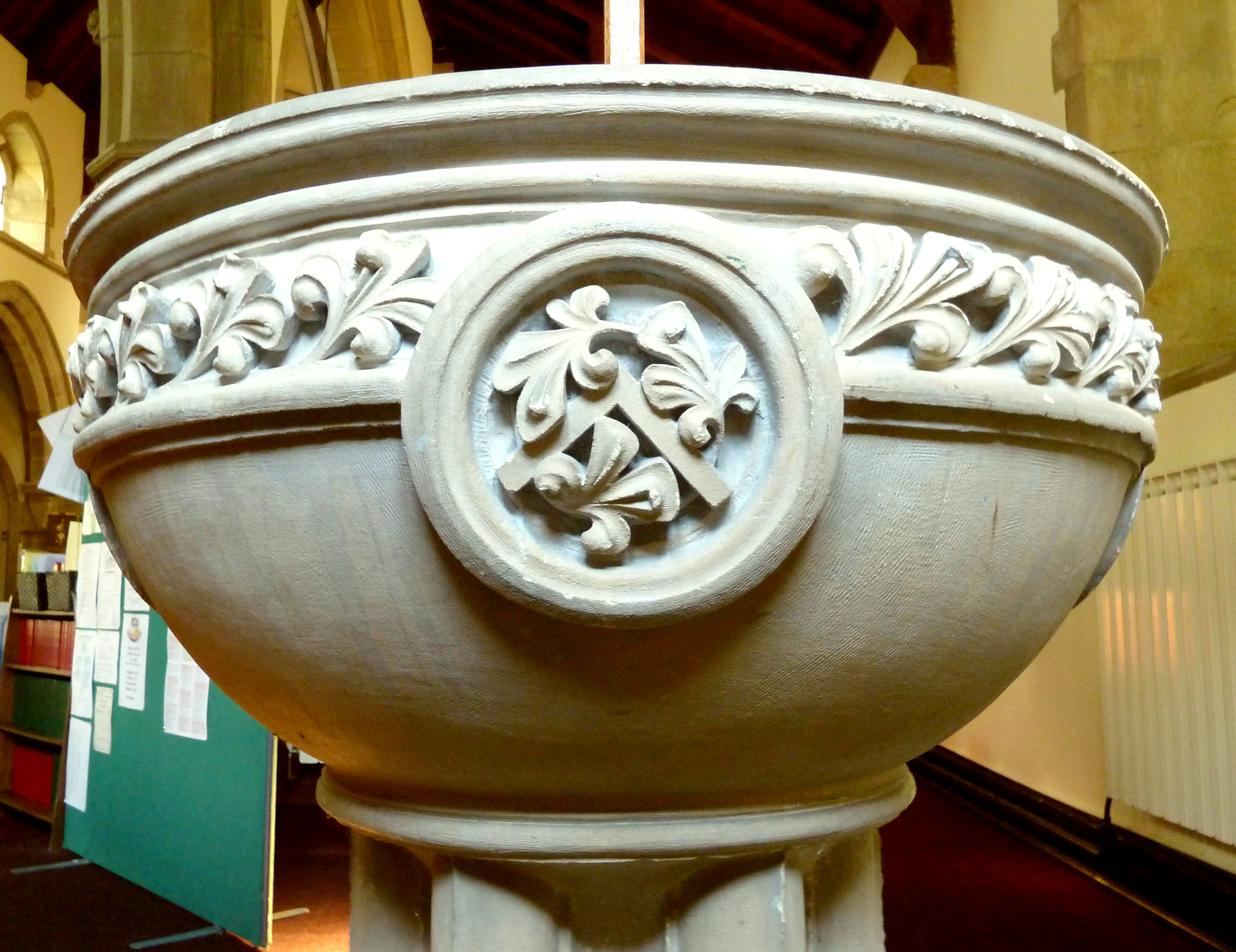
Font by Charles Mawer, showing square symbolising Thomas the Apostle

Between the nave and the north and south aisles are two arcades each of four doubly-chamfered arches, supported by circular columns with octagonal capitals. The chancel floor is three steps above that of the nave. It contains choir stalls designed by the architect William Swinden Barber on either side, and in a 1905–1908 chancel reordering these were augmented by two clergy seats and two prayer desks for the choir. The original choir stalls were described in 1880 as being "plain but very solid construction", like the nave pews which were also designed by the architect. On the south side of the chancel is the organ chamber, and on the north side is the vestry which has access through the north wall and into the chancel. The chancel arch was built "as lofty as possible", being the "chief internal feature of the structure". All the woodwork is made of pitch pine, and was originally treated or varnished to appear as close as possible to its natural colour, although the roof timbers looked warmer than the pews when new. The nave is 56.5 feet (17.2 m) by 20.75 feet (6.32 m), and the north and south aisles are 56.5 feet (17.2 m) by 9.66 feet (2.94 m). The chancel is 31.25 feet (9.53 m) by 19 feet (5.8 m). The organ chamber contained no organ at first, when it measured internally 16.5 feet (5.0 m) by 10.5 feet (3.2 m). At the consecration, a harmonium was used in default of the absent organ, and the church still contains a harmonium which may date back to 1880.

The font and pulpit, designed by the architect and sculpted by Charles Mawer of Leeds, are made of Caen stone, and were paid for by Lady Ingilby. The nave and chancel originally had plain brass gas lamp standards made by Hardman's Works, and there was hot-air heating apparatus supplied by Grundy. The books were given by Mrs and the Misses Lloyd of Hazelcroft. Plate used for communion service was given by Mrs W. Strother, and the chairs in the chancel were given by Mr H. Cautley. The surplices and linen were given by the vicar of Killinghall Reverend R.K. Smith and his wife. Thomas Strother presented the altar in memory of his mother who died in 1863. Dinah Cautley (d.1910) paid for the oak chancel screen in 1905.

==== Organ ====
The pipe organ, built by William Andrews of Bradford, was installed in 1908. It has a carved oak case, copperplate script on ivory drawstops and a radiating and concave pedalboard. It was renovated in 1992 by J.M. Spinks of Leeds. Dinah Cautley (d.1910) donated the two-manual organ, which in its time was one of the largest in Nidderdale.

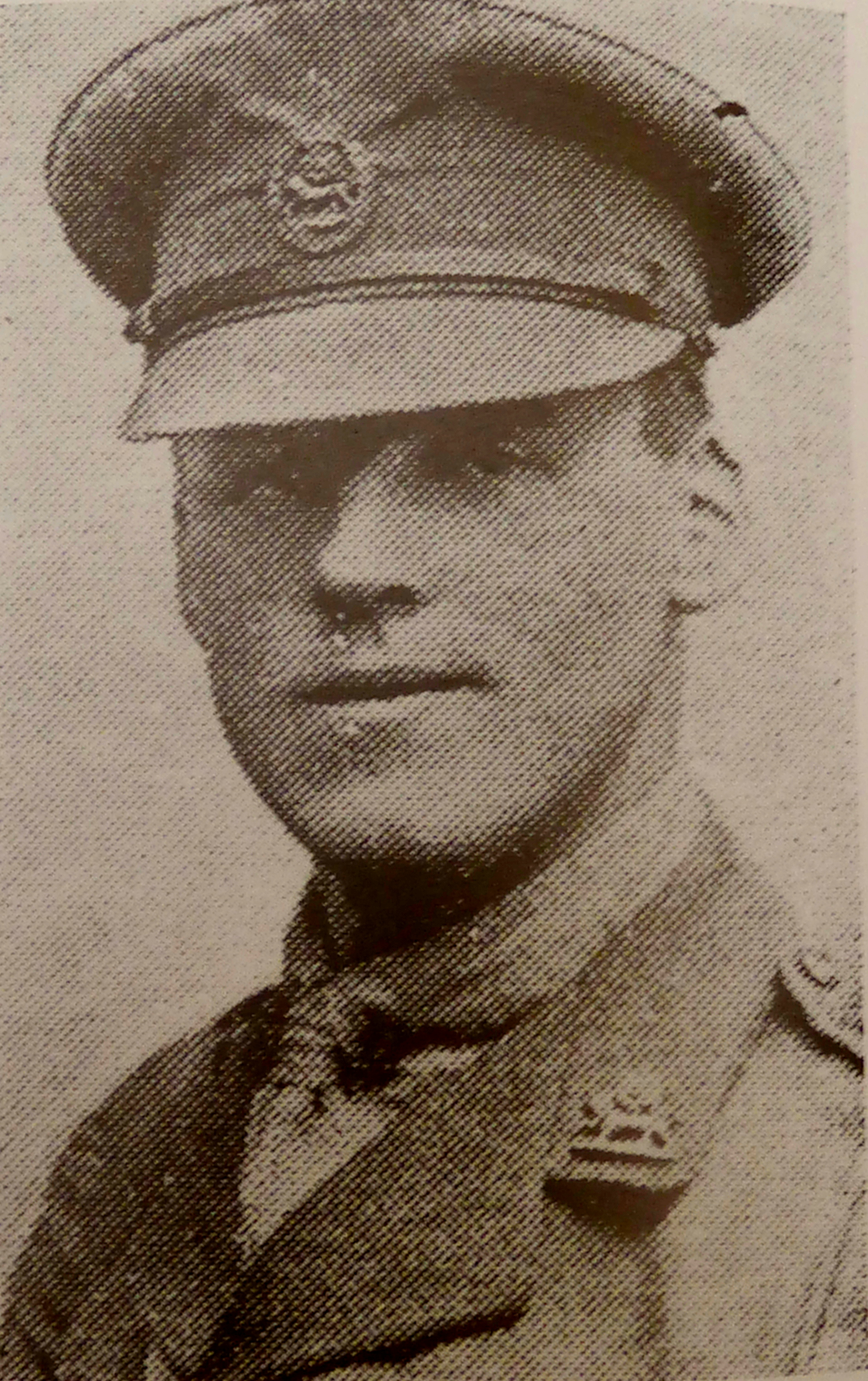
2nd Lieut Strother

==== Memorial plaques ====
There is a brass plaque presented by Lady Ingilby in memory of churchwarden George Lewis (d.1932). There are three memorial tablets commemorating the Strother family, including John Marmaduke Strother MC, Second Lieutenant, killed in action aged 24 in 1917. He is also remembered on the Arras Memorial and the Killinghall War Memorial. His tablet was engraved by Jesper of Harrogate. Dinah Cautley, a major benefactor to the church, has a tablet in the nave to her memory, recording her death in 1910 at age 79. She was the aunt of Henry Cautley MP. There is a tablet dedicated to a judge, Frederick McCulloch Jowitt CBE (d.1921).

There is a tablet in honour of Arthur Keightley Smith (1886–1942), son of the church's first vicar, who was lost at sea near Sumatra in World War II. Canon Elliston (d.1943), the church's second vicar, and the organist George Thomas Woods, are also remembered with a tablet. William Watson Mitchell (d.1933) also has a tablet in his memory.

==== 1905–1908 re-ordering ====
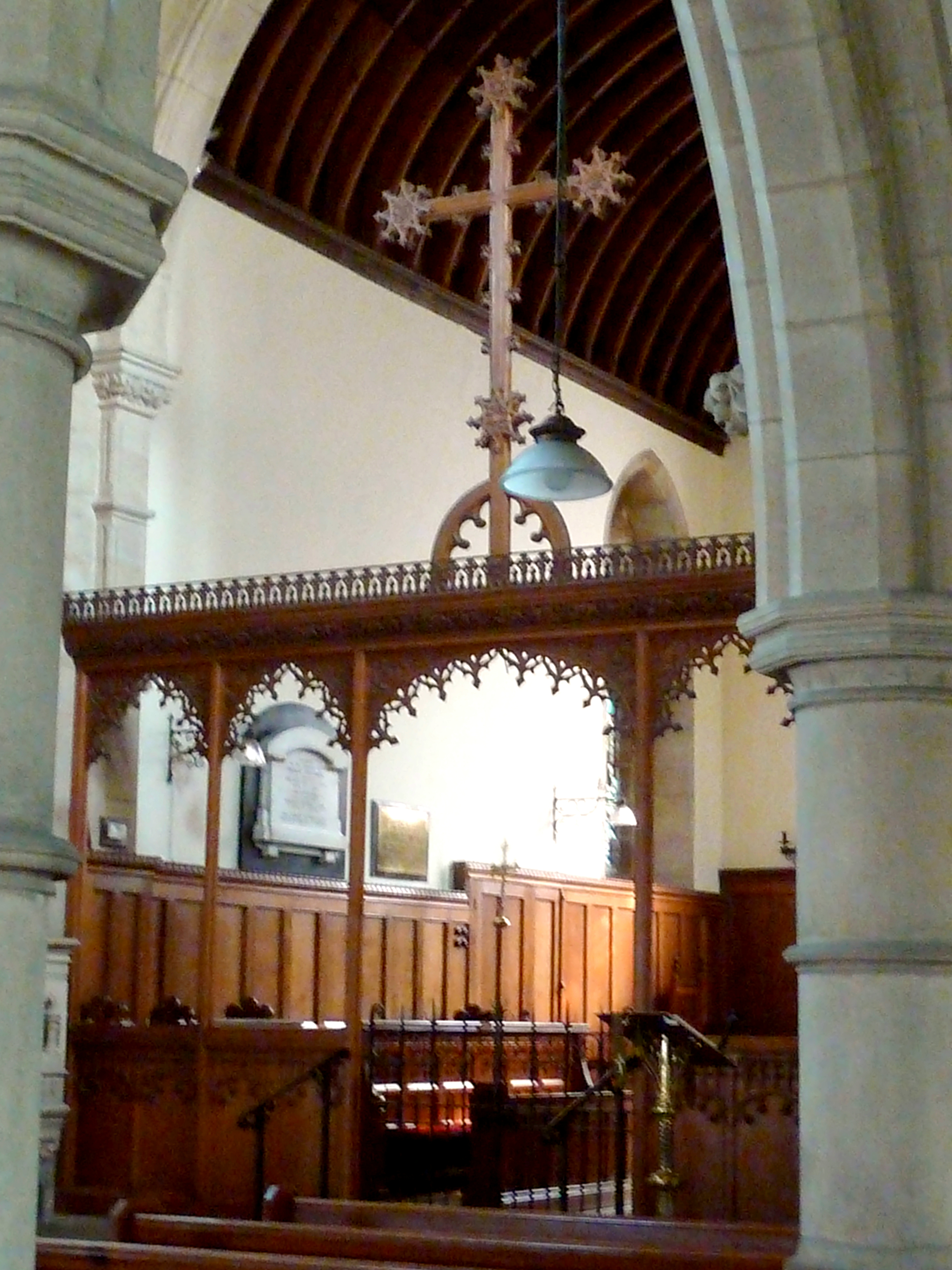
Hodgson Fowler's 1905 chancel screen

In 1905, Canon Elliston and churchwardens Andus Hirst and George Lewis petitioned the Bishop of Ripon William Boyd Carpenter for a faculty to take down and remove the altar and rails, the clergy choir stalls and the prayer desks from the chancel. The wanted to remove the communion rail steps under the chancel arch, and all of the floor east of them. They wanted to raise the chancel floor by four inches, and to replace the chancel steps with Pateley Bridge stone. They planned a new chancel floor of the same stone, laid in squares and diamonds. There would be a new chancel screen, and an asphalt concrete floor overlaid with pitch pine under the choir stalls. They wanted a new altar of Austrian wainscot oak, and rails around it. Above the altar, they planned a retable with brass cross, flower vases and candlesticks. They wanted a wooden dado around the three chancel walls. They wanted to re-fix Barber's original pitch-pine choir stalls, but planned additional pitch pine seats for clergy, and new desks for the choir boys. They wanted a new carved oak chancel screen with a cross on top. They also wanted wrought iron gates in the chancel screen "to prevent the entrance of strangers into the chancel, who visit the church during the summer months, when it is left open for private prayer." The cost was estimated at £265, to be raised by voluntary contribution (in the event the cost of the chancel screen was donated by Dinah Cautley). They stated that the congregation had approved these plans. Elliston was given permission on 10 November 1905. to complete the project within the following three years.

William Swinden Barber, who had originally designed the building, had retired and moved to Hampshire, so C. Hodgson Fowler designed the reordering and drew up the plans.

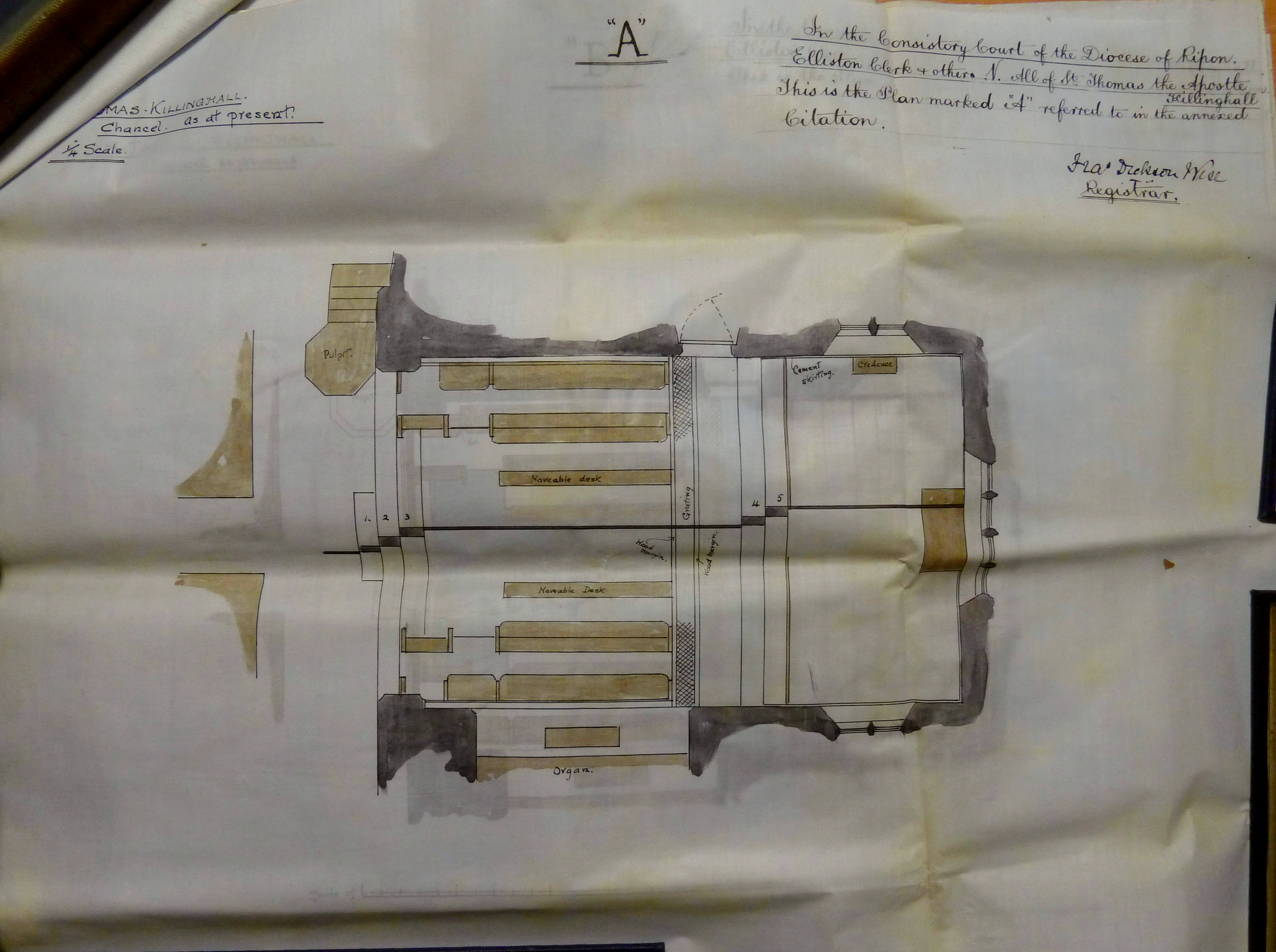
Fowler's drawing of Barber's 1880 interior design for chancel

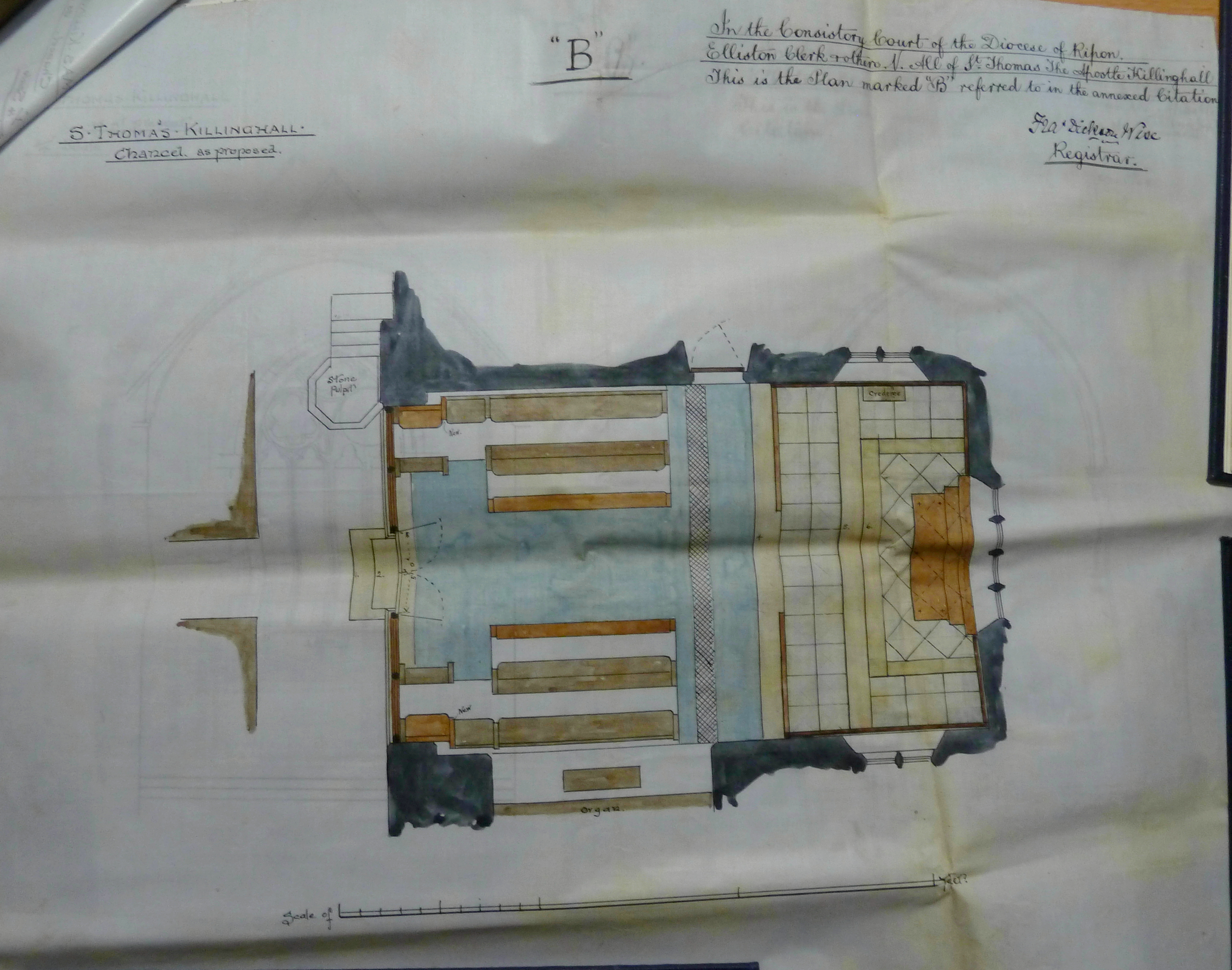
Hodgson Fowler's 1905 design for chancel

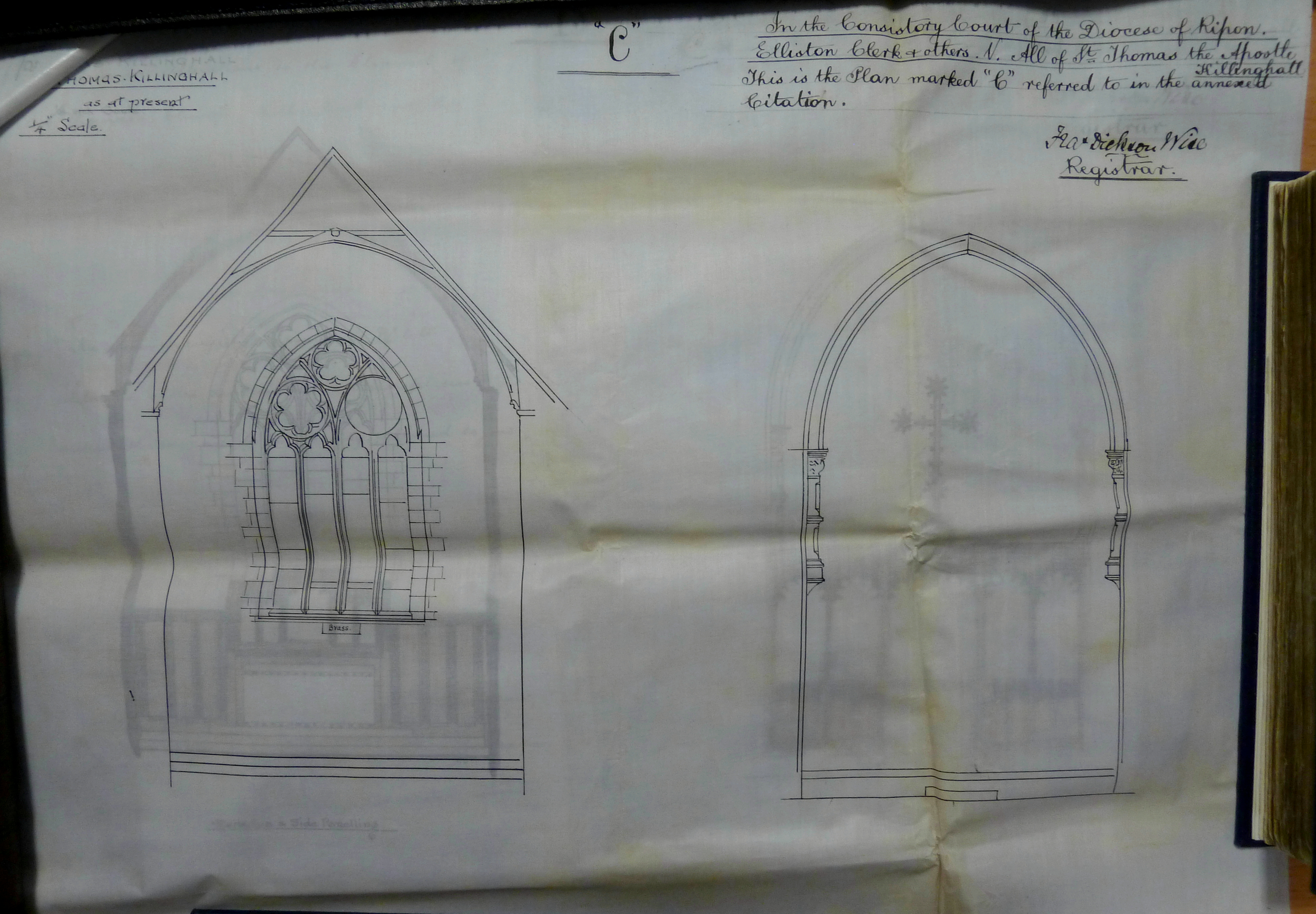
Fowler's drawing of Barber's east window and chancel arches

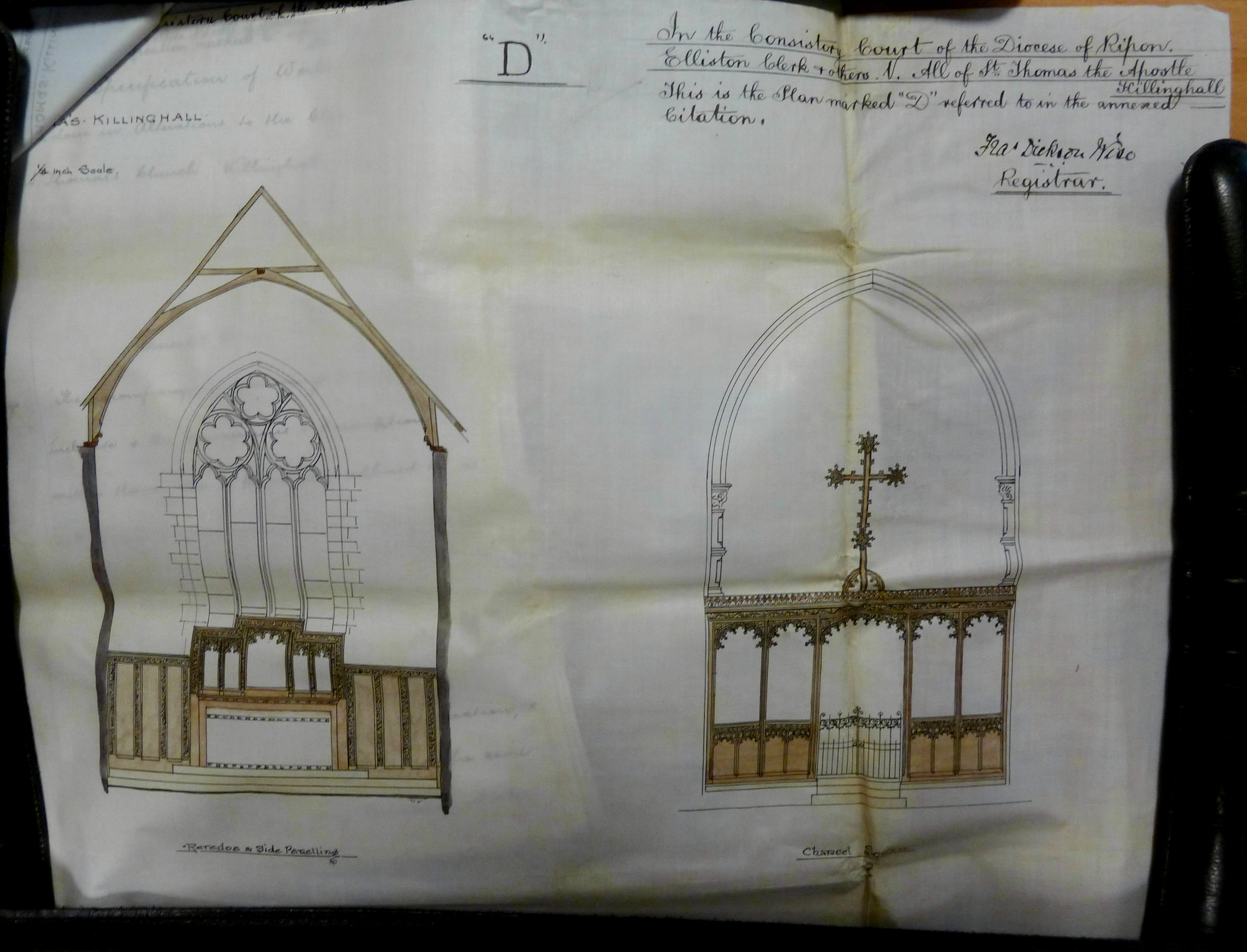
Hodgson Fowler's 1905 retable and chancel screen design

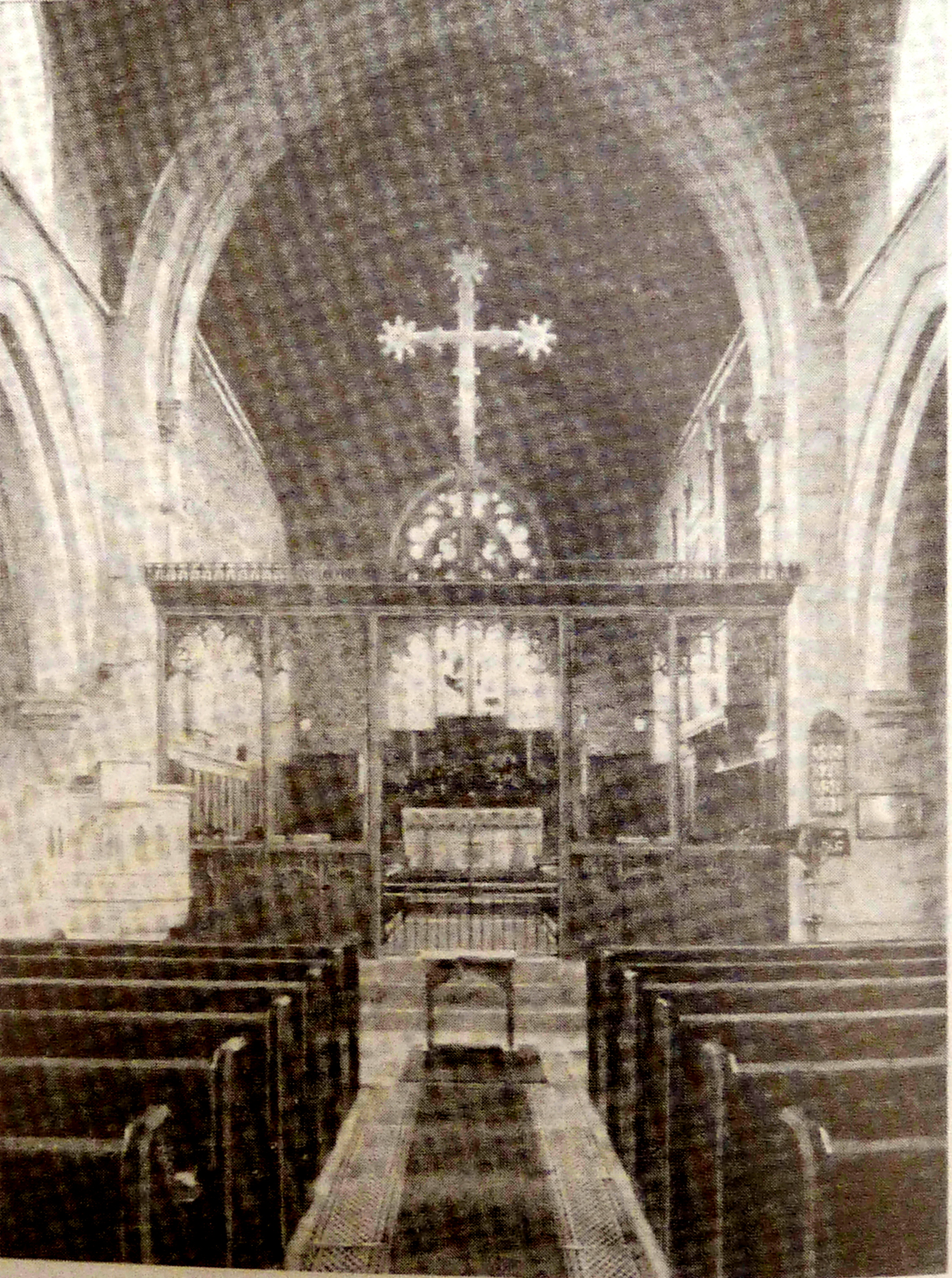
The chancel 1905–1913

== Stained glass ==
=== South aisle ===
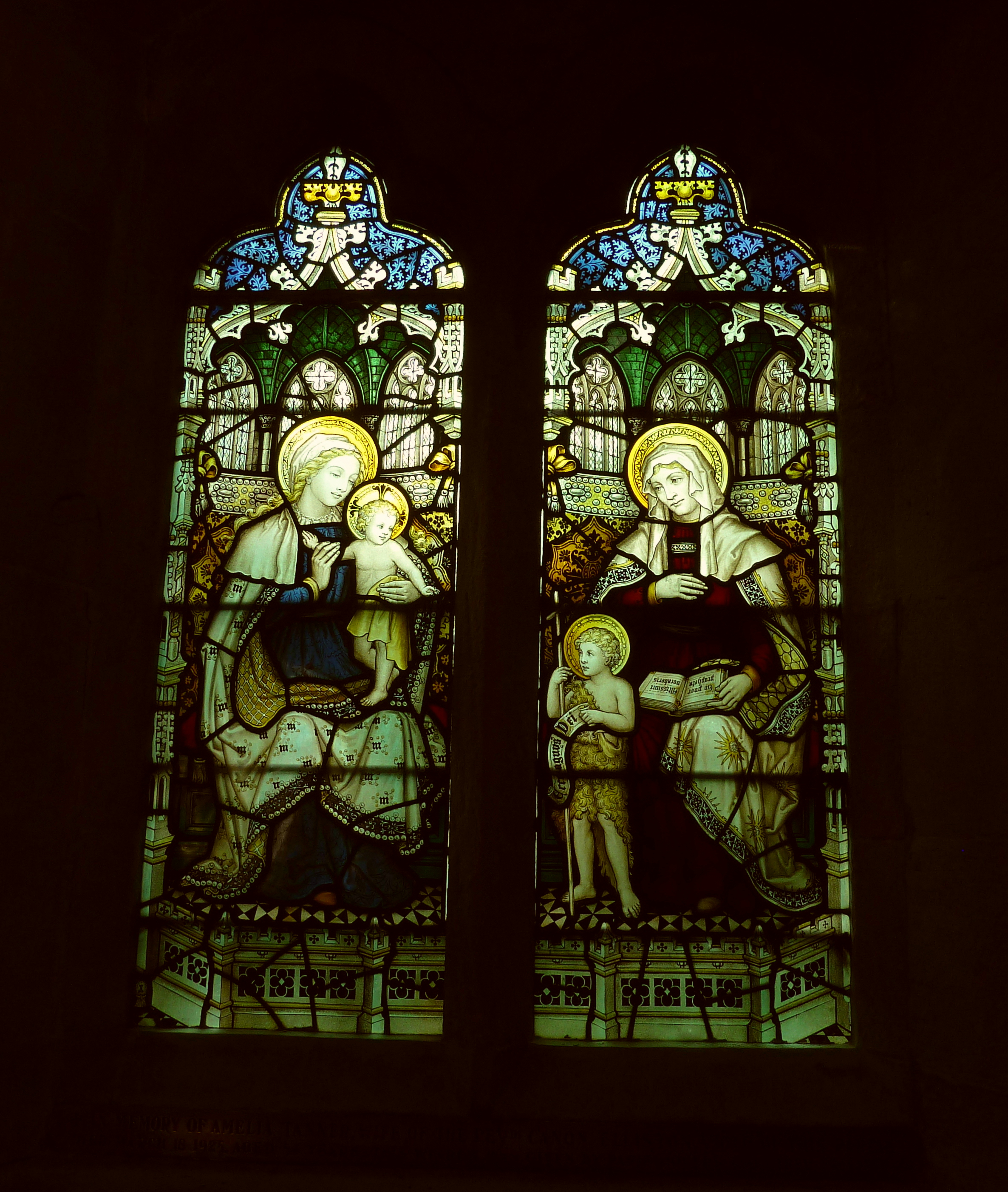
The Mary and Elizabeth window

In the most westerly window on the south aisle, the right-hand light shows Elizabeth, and her son John the Baptist. Her book shows a line from the Song of Zechariah. It translates as "You, my son, shall be called the prophet of the most high." (Luke 1:68–79). The child John is looking at baby Jesus in the other window light, and he holds the words "agnus dei" or Lamb of God. The left-hand light shows the Madonna and Child, and everybody is looking at John. This window was given by parishioners in memory of Amelia Tanner, the wife of Reverend Elliston. The three-light window on the south aisle illustrates Matthew 4.24: "And they brought unto him all sick people that were taken with divers diseases and torments." This window was given by Dinah Cautley in 1887 in memory of her husband William, a doctor of obstetrics. The Cautleys lived in the Manor House where the Cautley estate (built 1960s) now stands in Killinghall. The two-light window at the east end of the south aisle was given in 1887 in memory of Mary Ann Wray by her Daughter Dinah Cautley." This window shows the Annunciation on the left, and the Resurrection on the right. It is possible that the bottom right figure is Thomas the Apostle.

=== Chancel ===
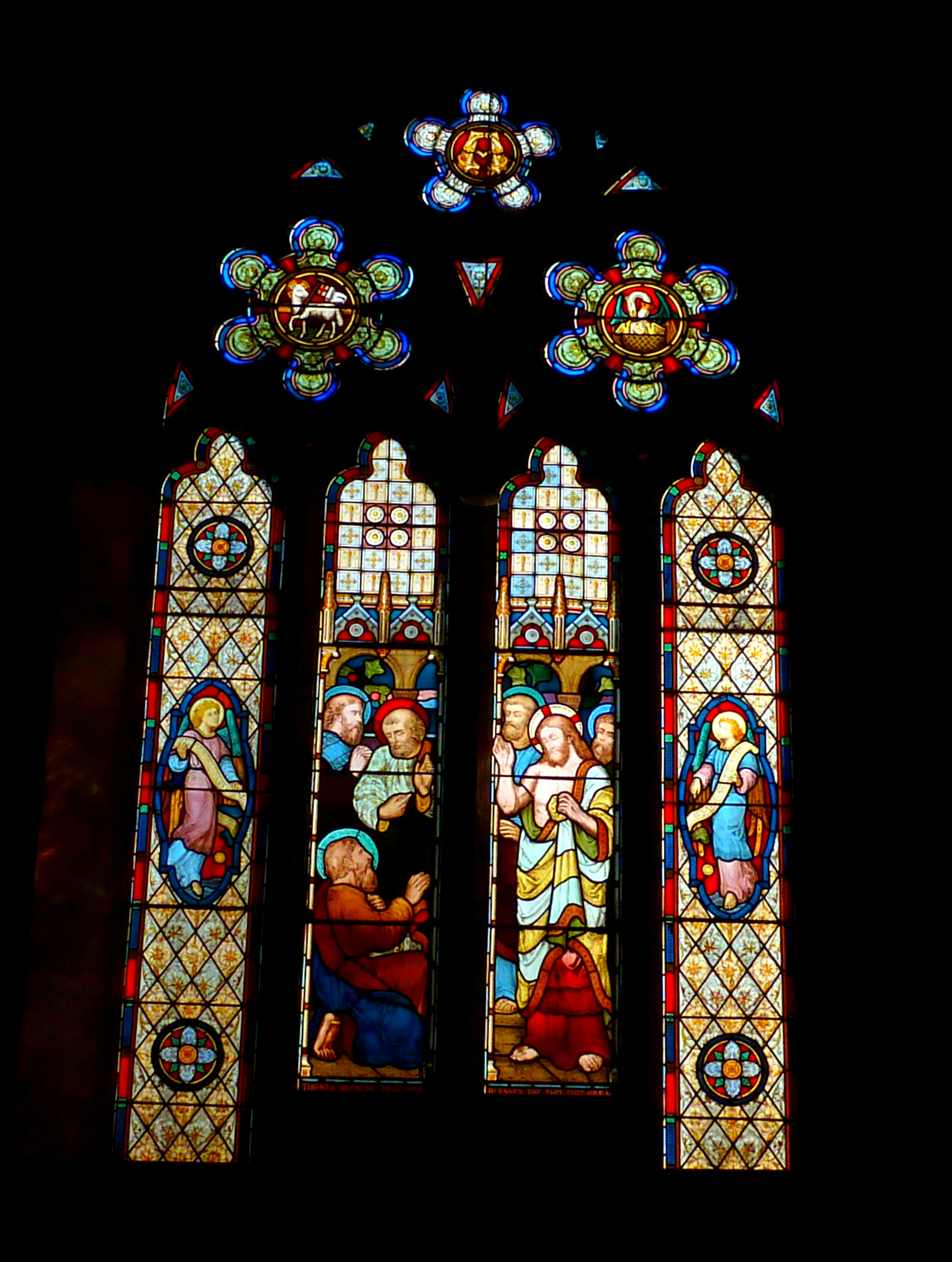
The east window

In the two-light window on the north side of the chancel, the left light features the Raising of Lazarus story (John 11:1–44). The text says "Lazarus come forth" (John 11.43) and "Jesus wept" (John 11.35). The second light illustrates the story of the Raising of the son of the widow of Nain (Luke 7:11–17) This window was dedicated to William Strother by his mother. The Strothers were major landowners in the village area, living locally at Low Hall, Kennel Hall Farm and Westfield. The east window was made by Cox & Son. The design of the central two lights is based on John 20:24–29, the story of Doubting Thomas. In this image, Thomas (shown kneeling at bottom of second light from left) has finally seen the Resurrection and checked the wounds, and he now believes in it. The top part of the window consists of three small rose lights, containing symbols. The left symbol is the Paschal Lamb, a heraldic symbol in which the Lamb of God carries the cross of St. George. The right-hand rose shows a pelican vulning, a heraldic symbol (a crest in this case) of a self-sacrificing pelican feeding her young with the blood from her breast, symbolising the Passion. This medieval symbol was superseded by the Lamb and Flag. The image in the uppermost rose shows the intertwined Alpha and Omega. Thomas Strother, who paid for this window, dedicated it to his wife or mother, and died while the church was in process of construction. The two-light window on the north side of the chancel is dedicated to Thomas Strother (1806–1879) by his widow. The left-hand light represents St Peter, carrying the Keys of Heaven, with his book at his feet, symbolising the Scriptures. The angel below him carries the words, "Rejoice in the lord alway" (Paul's Epistle to the Philippians 4:4). The right hand light shows Paul the Apostle carrying a sword symbolising his martyrdom, with the Scriptures in the form of a book at his feet. The angel below him has the words "The just shall live by faith" (Paul's Epistle to the Romans 1:17).

=== North aisle ===
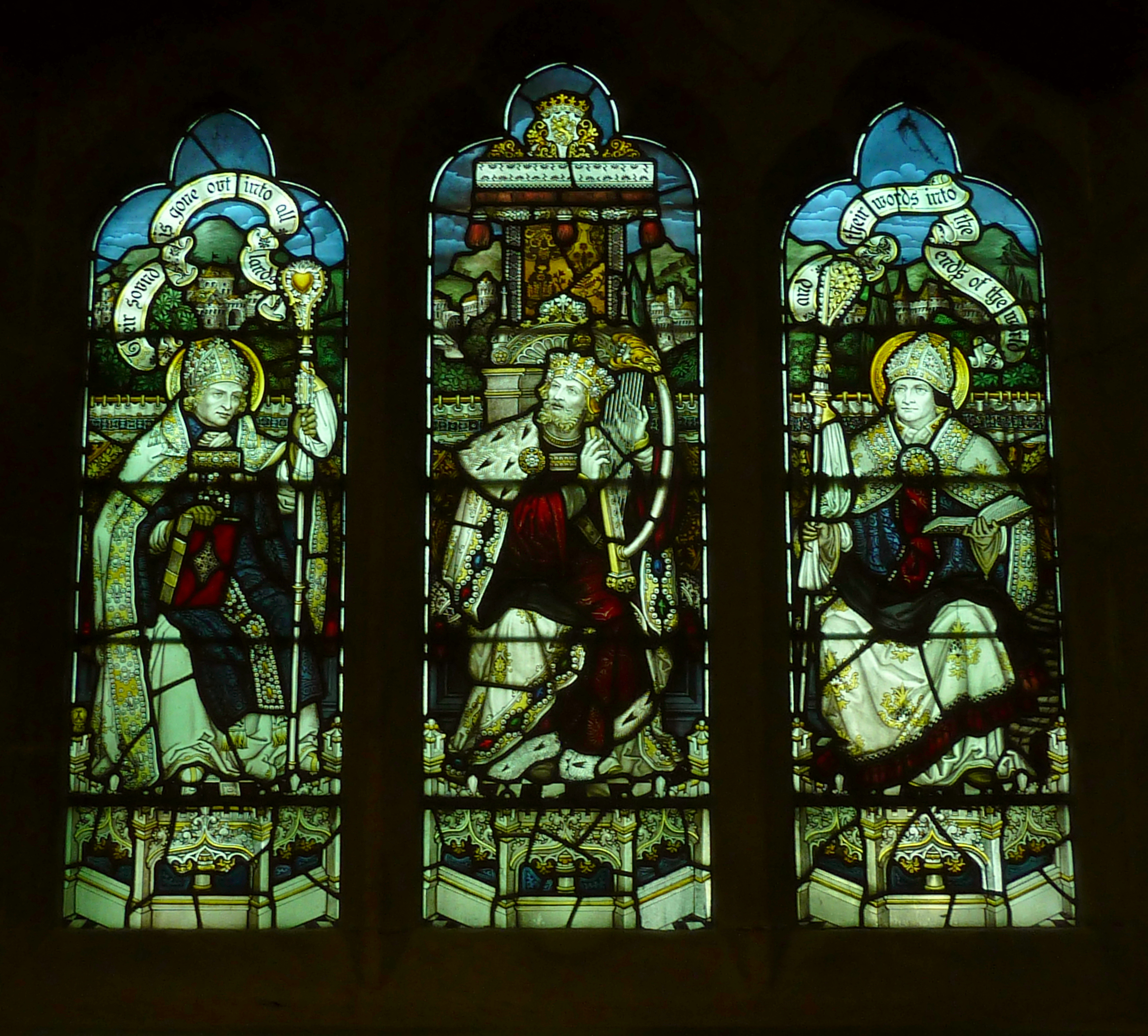
The King David window

The two-light window at the east end of the north aisle represents Mary and Martha of Bethany, mentioned in Luke 38–42. In that story, Mary is interested in spiritual matters, whereas Martha prefers to do practical work. Thus Martha has a housekeeper's attributes of a spinning wheel and a purse at her waist, while Mary is praying and reading the Scriptures. This window is dedicated to Ann Mitchell, the village postmistress, by her husband. The three-light window on the north aisle carries the theme of evangelism and music. It shows King David in the centre light, playing music. The left-hand light carries the words, "Their sound is gone out unto all lands," and the right-hand light says "and their words into the ends of the world." This is a translation of the 4th and 5th lines of Psalm 19, as it appears in the Book of Common Prayer: day 4, morning prayer. The men on either side of David are both saints with halos, and churchmen, wearing mitres. The dedication for this window is missing, but it was said by a local newspaper to have been given by William Clapham Cautley, and that it is dedicated to George Thomas Woods of the Order of Saint John. Woods was church organist for 24 years.

=== West wall ===
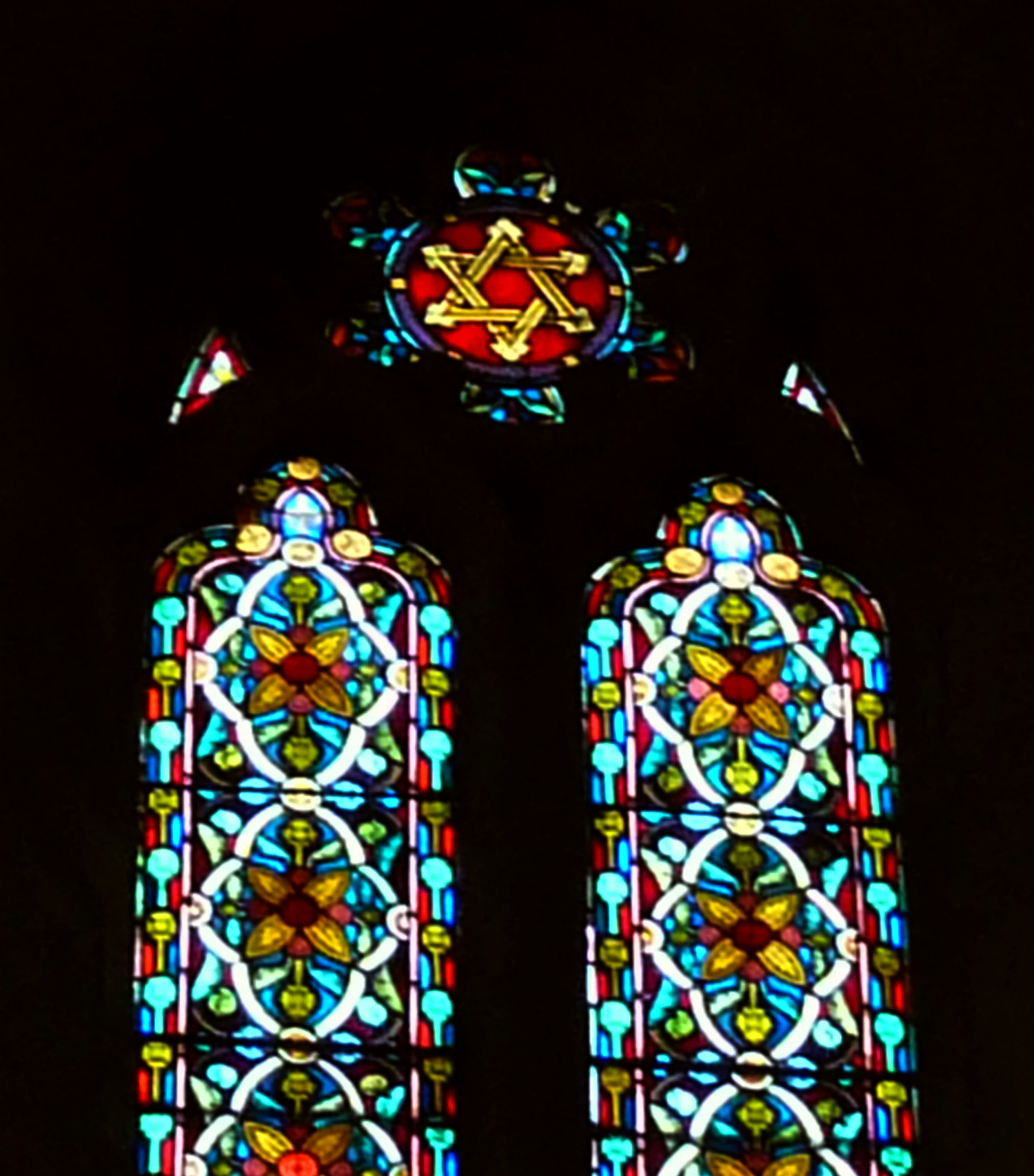
Part of west window

The western aisle-end windows are alike. The stonework of the apex of each window on the outside is in the form of a Canterbury cross. The coloured glass around the cross is painted with a stylised sunburst. The two large lights forming the main part of the windows have no coloured glass, allowing full light, especially on the font in the south aisle. The west window consists of two sets of two lights. The small rose light in the right-hand window has the Star of David, and the rose in the left-hand window has the IHS symbol, derived originally from the first three letters of Jesus' name in ancient Greek, but usually translated as "Christ the Redeemer". This window was made by Cox and Son, and paid for by the rector of Ripley, Reverend T.C. Thompson.

== Architect ==
William Swinden Barber FRIBA (1832–1908) was an architect who specialised in Gothic Revival Anglican churches, working mainly in Brighouse and Halifax. He is credited with at least 16 Grade II listed buildings. Several of his designs for churches with bell-gables were completed in 1880, the same year as St Thomas the Apostle. As with the pews, the Caen stone pulpit and the font in this building, Barber often designed the fittings himself, commissioning them from local Arts and Crafts woodcarvers and sculptors.

== Consecration ==
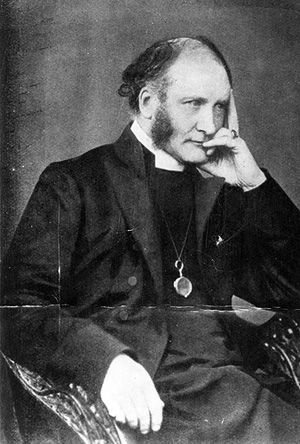
Bishop Robert Bickersteth

The building was consecrated by Robert Bickersteth, Bishop of Ripon (1816–1884), on Thursday 29 July 1880. The Pateley Bridge and Nidderdale Herald described the scene thus:

"The weather remained comparatively fine during the whole of the day, and the little village presented quite an animated appearance, the constant stream of brilliant equipages, the uneasing flow of pedestrians proceeding from all directions towards the new church, and bunting copiously displayed from the houses denoting the importance with which the event was regarded in the surrounding district. The church was crowded to excess with a very brilliant assemblage."

The "brilliant assemblage" was listed in order of importance, led by Sir Henry Day and Lady Ingilby and their party from Ripley Castle, Lady Amootta Ingilby, Lady Bickersteth the wife of the Bishop of Ripon, various moneyed persons who had donated to the church building fund, and Professor Salmon of Dublin. These were followed by the local priests in their vestments, and the doctor: Reverend T.C. Thompson of Ripley, Reverend J.H. Huddleston, Reverend F. Houseman, and Dr Veale.

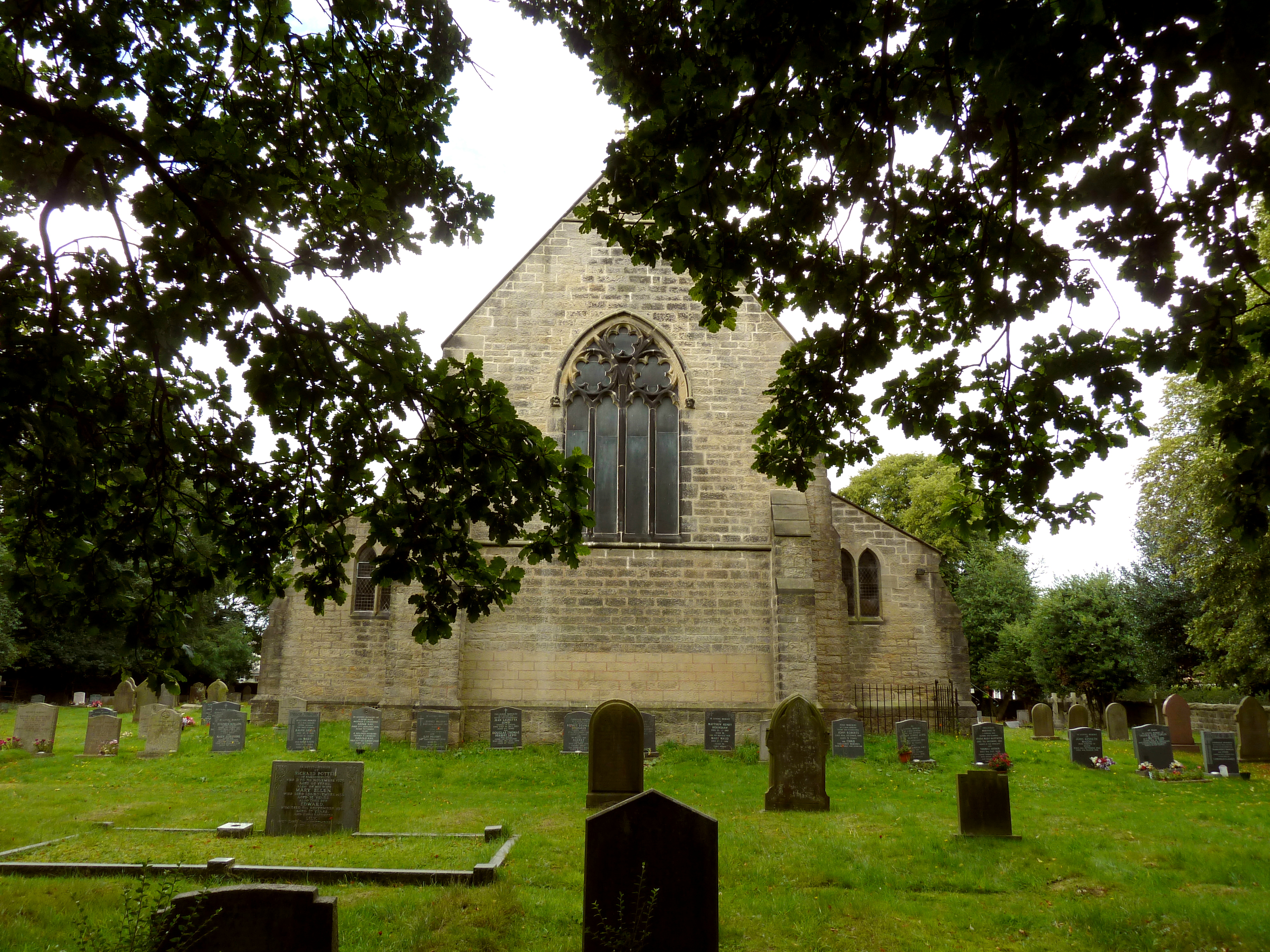
East wall of church

The bishop was welcomed at the north porch by wardens Thomas Smith and William Strother, and Sir H.D. Ingilby presented the petition for consecration. The procession of wardens, Mr Wise the diocesan registrar, the bishop and 23 clergymen then proceeded to the chancel. Among the clergymen were Reverend Canon Gibbon of Harrogate, Canon Crosthwaite of Knaresborough, Rev. R.K. Smith of Killinghall, Rev. G.O. Brownrigg of Harrogate, Rev. F.L. Harrison of Pannal, Rev. H. Deck of Hampsthwaite, Rev. Cope of Bramley, J.G.B. Knight of Birstwith, Rev. Faulkner of Bishop Monkton, Rev. Lucas of Hartwith, Rev. J.J. Pulleine of Kirby Wiske (chaplain to the bishop), Rev. Patchett of Sawley, Rev. Horsfall of Dacre, and Rev. B.K. Wood of Bilton. Smith, Pulleine, Brownrigg and Gibbon assisted the bishop in the service. The Killinghall choir was augmented by the Ripley choristers, and Fred Mitchell played the harmonium.

The text for the bishop's sermon was the 8th verse of Psalm 26: "Lord I have loved the habitation of thy house, and the place where thine honour dwelleth." He commented that "no excuse could now be made" that the congregation "had no church immediately at hand." He said it was "his earnest hope that those for whom the church had been erected would show their thankfulness by availing themselves constantly of those privileges which would be there accorded them." He ended by saying that donations on that day would be applied first to the remaining debt for the cost of building the church, and the balance would be kept towards the future building of a vicarage. The collection raised £40.

In the afternoon after the service there was a sale of work in the schoolroom, raising a sum between £20 and £25 in aid of the building fund. 200 local people were entertained to a tea to which the journalist of the Pateley Bridge and Nidderdale Herald was presumably invited, since he described it as a "great success". This was followed by an evening service held by the Dean of Ripon, the Reverend R.K. Smith vicar of Killinghall, Reverend J.J. Pulleine and Reverend H. Deck. The collection on this occasion raised more than £7 towards the building fund.

== Accident ==
Since the bells and organ had not yet been installed, it is probable that the mason James Simpson was still working on the same building on 9 August 1880. On that day his employee Anthony Carrow at Killinghall slipped from scaffolding, fell "a considerable distance" and sustained "a somewhat serious fracture of the thigh." He was taken to the Cottage Hospital at Harrogate, and by the following Wednesday he was "progressing favourably."

== Bicentenary and centenary celebrations ==
The bicentenary of the parish and church building was celebrated in 1930, the service being held by Reverend Canon Sydney Robert Ellison, the second vicar of the parish.

On Tuesday 29 July 1980, a celebratory centenary service was held at the church by Reverend David Young, Bishop of Ripon. Afterwards, Sir Thomas C.W. Ingilby cut the cake. At the centenary it was noted by local historian and churchwarden Mrs K.J. Russell that the Church of St Thomas the Apostle had recorded 1,437 baptisms, 491 marriages and 1,077 interments.

== Graveyard ==
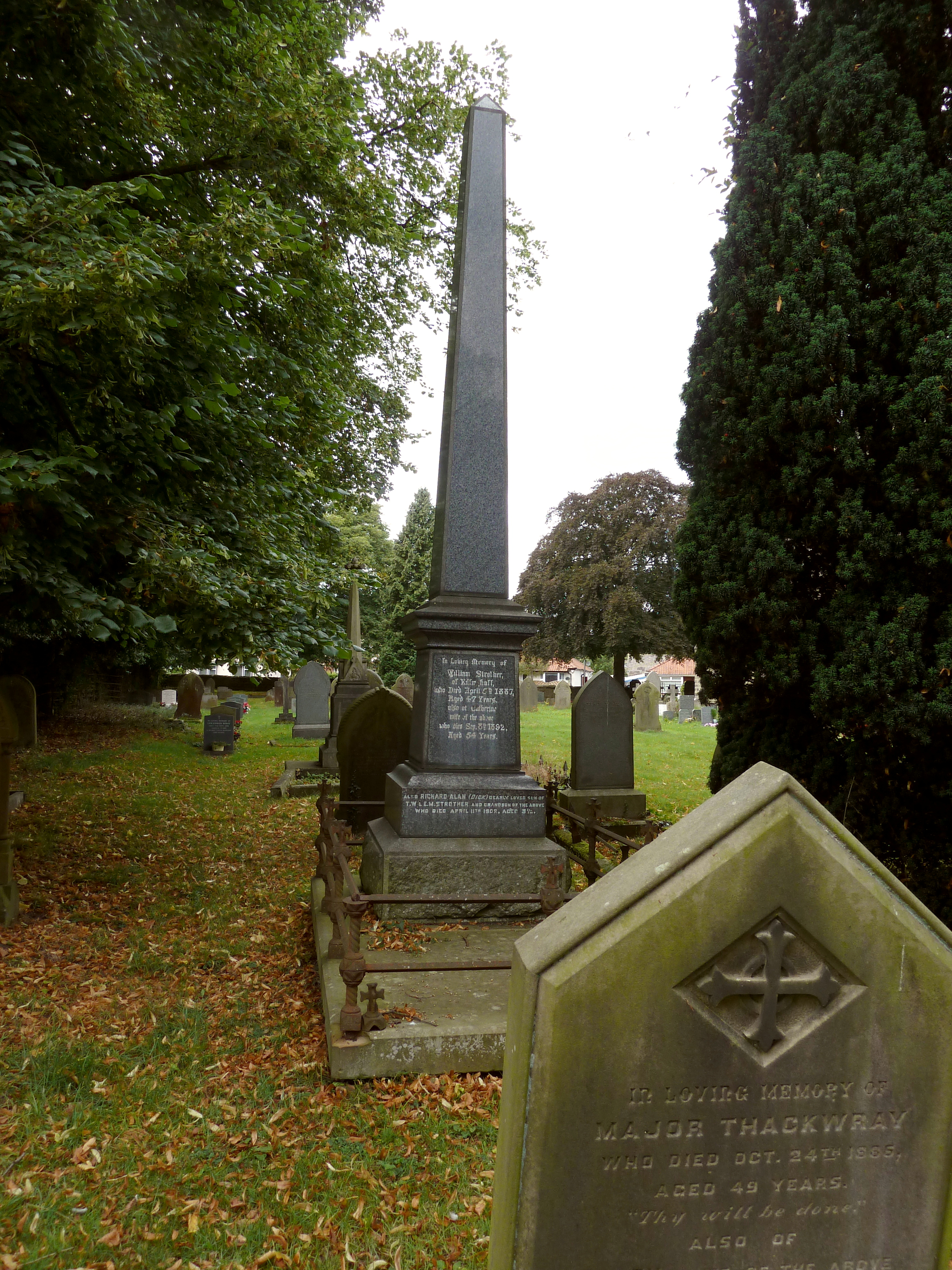
19th-century monuments

The burial ground was consecrated directly after the consecration service for the church building, on 29 July 1880. The first burials took place in 1880, and these continued at least until 1993. Dinah Cautley and her husband, major benefactors of the church, have a prominent grave here.

== Vicarage ==
The old vicarage was built on Otley Road between 1880 and 1882, possibly designed by William Swinden Barber. Fetes and garden parties used to take place in its grounds. It was sold in 1976 when the parish was combined with Hampsthwaite, where the incumbent would now be living.

== Services, events and facilities ==
Services take place on most Sundays at 9.30 am at St Thomas the Apostle, except for the fourth Sunday of the month. This is a joint benefice service at 11 am rotating around Killinghall, Birstwith, Hampsthwaite and Felliscliffe churches. The Book of Common Prayer is used at the services. There is a Sunday school in the village hall every first Sunday of the month. There is Holy Communion every first and second Sunday of the month, and all age worship on the third Sunday of the month at the same time. During school term time, there is tea and toast early on Tuesday mornings, followed by prayers. Every second Tuesday of the month, except during February, there is a mums and tots session in the church, with a coffee and cake session for all in the afternoon. The church has a regular choir, and hosts live music concerts. The church is available for hire for concerts and other events.

The church building has wheelchair-accessible toilets, baby-changing facilities, an Audio induction loop, large-print hymn books, and guide dogs are welcome. A crèche is offered at certain times.

== Clergy ==
=== Parish of Killinghall ===
==== Reverend Reginald Keightley Smith ====
1880–1903. The first vicar of the parish was Reverend Reginald Keightley Smith (1838–1904). He was baptised at St Brides Liverpool on 15 April 1838, son of John and Mary Smith. His father was an American and West India merchant. He attended St John's College, Cambridge, gaining his BA in 1869 and his MA in 1873. He was ordained deacon in 1869, and priest in 1870 by the Bishop of Oxford. He was curate of West Hendred near Wantage 1869–1871, of Bridekirk, Cumbria 1877–1878, and of St Lawrence's Church, Appleby 1878–1880. He married Anna Maria A. Collin at Cockermouth in 1879. He was installed as vicar of Killinghall at the consecration of St Thomas the Apostle on 29 July 1880 and served until his death in 1904. He performed the church's first baptism on 15 August 1880. On 14 June 1882, his infant son Reginald Augustus Keightley died at the vicarage. He had three surviving children: Charlotte Coney Keightley (b.1881), Richard Keightley (b.1884) and Arthur Keightley (1886–1943) who was lost at sea in World War II. It was Keightley Smith who donated the lectern to the church. The patron of his living was Sir Henry Day Ingilby. His net income was £214 plus use of the vicarage. The parish population was 670 in 1880. By 1890 his income had risen to £325 and the population to 678. The size of his parish by then was 3514 acres. He died on 9 January 1904 at age 65 years at his brother's house in Chester after a long illness. He was buried on 13 January in the family vault at Birkenhead Priory. At the time of the burial, a funeral service was held for him at St Thomas, Killinghall, held by Rev. W.T. Travis of Ripley, Rev. S.T. Dawson of St Luke, Harrogate, and Rev. W. Morris, locum of Killinghall.

==== Canon Sydney Robert Elliston ====
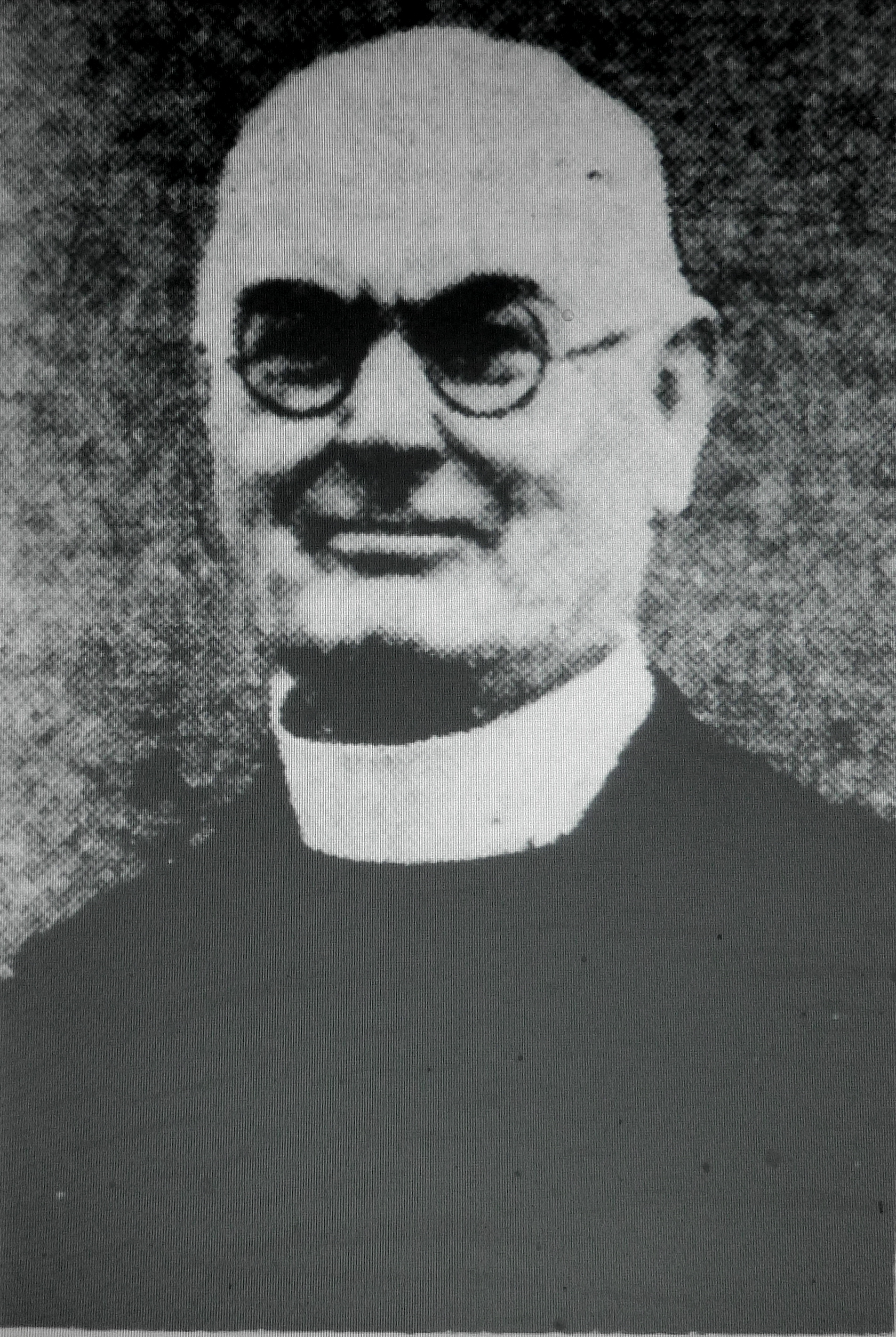
Canon Elliston

1904–1935. Rev. R. K. Smith was followed between 1904 and 1935 by Canon Sydney Robert Elliston (1870–1943), who covered the hard years of the Great War and the Great Depression. He was on the staff of the Morning Leader 1892–1894. He was ordained deacon in 1894, and priest in 1895 by the Suffragan Bishop of Southwark. He was curate of Blyth 1894–1898; West Retford 1898–1901, and St Mark's Lakenham 1901–1904. He was installed as vicar of Killinghall in 1904. In 1935 he resigned due to ill health. For many years he had been secretary of Ripon Diocesan Board of Finance, so his funeral was attended by a large number of officers of the financial departments of Ripon Cathedral, local clergy, and others who had travelled some distance when private travel was difficult during World War II.

Between March and April 1935, the priest in charge was J.R. Lee.

==== Reverend Alfred William Price ====
1936–1940. Reverend Alfred William Price (1896–1972) was the first of two incumbents who served during World War II. He was born on 31 August 1896 in Gloucester. His father was William John Price, a Naval seaman, and his mother was Edith Emily Etheridge. He had an Associateship of King's College, London, 1928. He was ordained deacon in 1928, and priest in 1929 at Blackburn at the age of 58 years. He was curate of Poulton-le-Fylde 1928–1930, St Mark, Bury 1930–1933, St Peter's Church, Harrogate September 1933 – 1936, and vicar of Killinghall from February 1936 to June 1940. In 1935 at the age of 64 years Price was offered the living of Killinghall by Sir William Ingilby of Ripley Castle, to be taken up in 1936. In 1936 a woman parishioner at Killinghall "severely criticised the untidy hair of the vicar and some of the choirboys." Price responded in the parish magazine, acknowledging the fault and the receipt of three brushes and combs, and saying with some humour that, "You may be sure that the choirboys and myself will stand before the looking glass in future, brush and comb in hand." His benefice included 1.5 acres of glebe land worth £4, His ecclesiastical commission was £400 per annum, and his fees £4, so his gross and net income was £408 plus vicarage. The parish population was 1098 in 1937. By 1940 Price had more income from other sources, amounting to an additional £54 per anuum. He was vicar of Holy Trinity Wibsey 1940–1942, and Rural Dean of Bowling, Bradford, 1948–1952. He was rector of All Saints Thurlestone 1952–1963. He died in Plymouth aged 86 years in 1972.

==== Canon Lindsay Shorland-Ball ====
1940–1947. The second vicar of Killinghall during World War II was Reverend Lindsay Shorland-Ball (1912–1978) who served between November 1940 and November 1947. He was born on 17 October 1912 in Stockport. He was an alumnus of Selwyn College, Cambridge, gaining a 3rd class history tripos in 1933, his BA in 1935 and his MA in 1939. He graduated from Ridley Hall, Cambridge in 1935. He was ordained deacon in 1937, and priest in 1938 by the Bishop of Ripon. In 1937 he married Kathleen M. Potter in Halstead, Essex. He was curate of Richmond, North Yorkshire 1937–1940. When he left Richmond, the parishioners presented him and his wife with a clock and two chairs. He was vicar of Killinghall 1940–1947. When on leave from his duties as naval chaplain in 1946, he wrote in the parish magazine that the church congregation had dwindled. Later the parishes were to be combined due to low church attendance since World War II and shortage of funds. At Killinghall his patron was Sir William Ingilby. His benefice comprised a glebe of 1.5 acres, ecclesiastical commission of £400, and fees of £4, giving a gross income of £458, net £367 plus vicarage. The parish population was 1098. He was chaplain to the RNVR 1944–1946. He was vicar of North Collingham 1947–1953, and of St Edmund's, Mansfield Woodhouse 1953–1960. He was surrogate from 1958. He was vicar and Rural Dean of St Swithun's Church, East Retford from 1960, and honorary canon of Southwark Cathedral from 1968. He died in 1978 in Chipping Norton, aged 66 years.

==== Venerable Robert Collier ====
1948–1952. From March 1948 to May 1952 the vicar was Reverend Robert Collier. He was born on 21 September 1909, educated at Shaftesbury House Tutorial College, Belfast, and gained his BA (Resp.) from Trinity College, Dublin in 1931. He was ordained deacon in 1932, and priest in 1933 by the Bishop of Down, Connor and Dromore. He was curate of St Mary, Belfast 1932–1935.

In 1935–1936 he was appointed to be registrar for the Native Christian Marriage and Divorce Ordinance, in Kenya. His first work with the Church Missionary Society was as missionary 1935–1938 at Nakuru where there was a theological college and school, where he may have taught. He completed his missionary work in Kitale 1938–1939. He resigned from the Missionary Society on 15 November 1939. He was chaplain of the ecclesiastical establishment of St. George's Cathedral, Chennai 1939–1940 and 1943–1946, Secunderabad 1940–1943, and Ooty 1946–1947.

He was hon chaplain to the forces from 1947. He then took a paid, post-service furlough 1947–1948, although he would have been working as chaplain during some of that time. He was, however, registered retrospectively as vicar of Killinghall from 1948 to 1952, although Crockford's Clerical Directory registers no incumbent from 1948 to 1950. At Killinghall his patron was Sir J.W.B. Ingilby of Ripley Castle. His gross income was £417 plus vicarage. The parish population was 1098. He was possibly at St Mary's Church, Arnold 1952–1957.

He was secretary to the Irish auxiliary office of the Commonwealth and Continental Church Society 1957–1961, and at the same time he had permission to officiate in the Diocese of Dublin. He was incumbent of Clonmel Union diocese at Lismore, County Waterford from 1961. He was prebend of Kilrossanty and treasurer of Lismore Cathedral, Ireland 1963–1969, and was concurrently prebend of St Patrick and treasurer of Christ Church Cathedral, Waterford 1963–1969. He was archdeacon of Waterford and Lismore from 1969. In 1969 he was living at the rectory at Clonmel, Tipperary, Eire. He was examining chaplain to the Bishop of Cashel and prebend of Waterford Cathedral from 1969. He died, probably in Eire, between 1977 and 1982.

==== Reverend Andrew Hodgson ====
1952–1958. Robert Collins was followed by Reverend Andrew Hodgson (1913–1991) between November 1952 and 1958. He was born on 20 December 1913 in Ludlow. He gained his BA at Merton College, Oxford in 1936, his Diploma in Education 1937, and his MA in 1945. He graduated from Westcott House, Cambridge in 1945. He was ordained deacon in 1947, and priest in 1948 by the Bishop of Ripon.

He was curate of Bedale 1947–1949, Harewood with East Keswick 1949–1952, Chaplain to the Forces (Territorial Army) from 1950, and vicar of Killinghall 1952–1958. His net endowment was £326, and his net benefice £554. By 1958 his net endowment was £331, his net benefice was £753, and the parish population had risen to 2425. His patron was J.W. Ingilby. He was vicar, of St Andrew, Honingham with East Tuddenham, Norwich 1958–1981. He retired with permission to officiate from 1981 until his death in Derby in 1991.

==== Reverend Robert V. Morris ====
1958–1976. The next incumbent was Reverend Robert Morris (1907–1986) between September 1958 and 1976 when he died. He was born on 18 April 1907. He attended Knutsford Ordination Test School in Hawarden, until 1929, then Lichfield Theological College, graduating in 1932. He was ordained deacon in 1934, and priest in 1936 by the Bishop of Lichfield. He was chaplain of St Mary Kingswinford 1934–1935, All Saints West Bromwich 1935–1937, Wensley, North Yorkshire1937–1939, Chaplain to the Forces (Royal Army Educational Corps 1939–1945, vicar of St Simon's Leeds (now demolished) 1946–1955, All Hallows (now demolished) with St Simon's Leeds 1955–1958.

He was vicar of Killinghall 1958–1976. His net endowment was £285, and net benefice £927. In 1964 the parish population was 2723. His patron was Sir J.W. Ingilby. In 1959 during Morris's incumbency, the church had a "fine choir which has gained a reputation for music of a high standard, and on a number of occasions its members have been invited to sing evensong at Ripon Cathedral." He officially retired in 1975, and died in 1986, aged 78 years, in Claro, Yorkshire.

=== Parish of Hampsthwaite and Killinghall ===
The parishes of Hampsthwaite and Killinghall were unofficially combined from 1976 onwards, allowing one priest to administer both. In 1993 the two benefices were officially combined.

==== Reverend John Frederick Walker ====
1976–1986. Between 1976 and 1986 there was no official incumbent. Reverend John Frederick Walker (1921–2007), vicar of Hampsthwaite with Felliscliffe, was priest in charge. He gained his BA at St John's College, Durham in 1947, his Diploma in Theology in 1949 and his MA in 1951. He was ordained deacon in 1949, and priest in 1950 by the Bishop of Wakefield. He was curate of Normanton, West Yorkshire 1949–1951, Northowram 1951–1953, vicar of Gawthorpe, Kirklees with Chickenley Heath 1953–1959, All Souls' Church, Halifax 1959–1973, Hampsthwaite from 1974 and curate in charge of Killinghall 1976–1986. As priest in charge of Killinghall he was living at Hampsthwaite vicarage because Killinghall vicarage had been sold. In 1980 he produced a centenary pamphlet for the church. He retired to Skipton in 1986 with permission to officiate, and died in 2007.

==== Reverend Anthony George Hudson ====
1987–1999. From Monday 30 March 1987 until 1999, Reverend Anthony George "Tony" Hudson (born 1939), priest in charge of Hampsthwaite and Killinghall, took the services. He took a Northern Ordination Course. He was ordained deacon in 1984, and priest in 1985. He was curate of St Mark's Church, Harrogate, 1984–1987, priest in charge of Hampsthwaite from 1987, and at the same time priest in charge of Killinghall from 1987. He was director of Ripon and Leeds Diocesan Board of Finance 1991–1999, a successor in that post to Canon Elliston. His patron was Sir Thomas Ingilby in 1992, but by the end of the century the patrons for this living were Sir James Aykroyd, Sir Thomas Ingilby and the Bishop of Ripon. At Hudson's installation, Reverend David Young, Bishop of Ripon, officiated, alongside the Venerable Norman McDermid, archdeacon of Richmond, North Yorkshire and Canon Howard Garside, rural dean. Sir Thomas Ingilby of Ripley Castle, patron of the living of St Thomas, was also present. He retired as vicar in 1999, with permission to officiate which was renewed in 2014.

==== Reverend Garry Anthony Frank Hinchcliffe ====
2000–2013. Reverend Garry Anthony Frank Hinchcliffe BD (Hons) was born in 1968. He obtained his bachelor's degree in 1994, and graduated from Edinburgh Theological College in 1990. He specialised in ecclesiastical history and the gospels. He married Ann and had five children. He was ordained deacon in 1994, and priest in 1995. He was curate of Dumfries 1994–1997, priest in charge of Motherwell and Wishaw 1997–2000. He was vicar of Hampsthwaite and Killinghall 2000–2004, and of Hampsthwaite, Killinghall and Birstwith 2004–2013. His patrons were Mrs S.J. Finn, Sir James Aykroyd and Sir Thomas Ingilby. At Killinghall he worked alongside Hon Curate R. Maclean-Reid. In October 2013 he transferred to Knaresborough.

==== Reverend Christella Helen Wilson ====
Between 2014 and 2015 the living was vacant according to Crockford's Clerical Directory. However, by 2014 the priest in charge of Hampsthwaite and Killinghall was Reverend Christella Helen Wilson, and by 2016 she was vicar. She was ordained deacon at Ripon Cathedral in July 2011, and ordained priest at St Robert's, Harrogate, on 1 July 2012. She graduated from the Yorkshire Ministry Course in 2008. She was curate of St Robert's, Pannal (with Beckwithshaw) 2011–2014. She was vicar of St Thomas, Hampsthwaite (with Killinghall and Birstwith) from 2014.

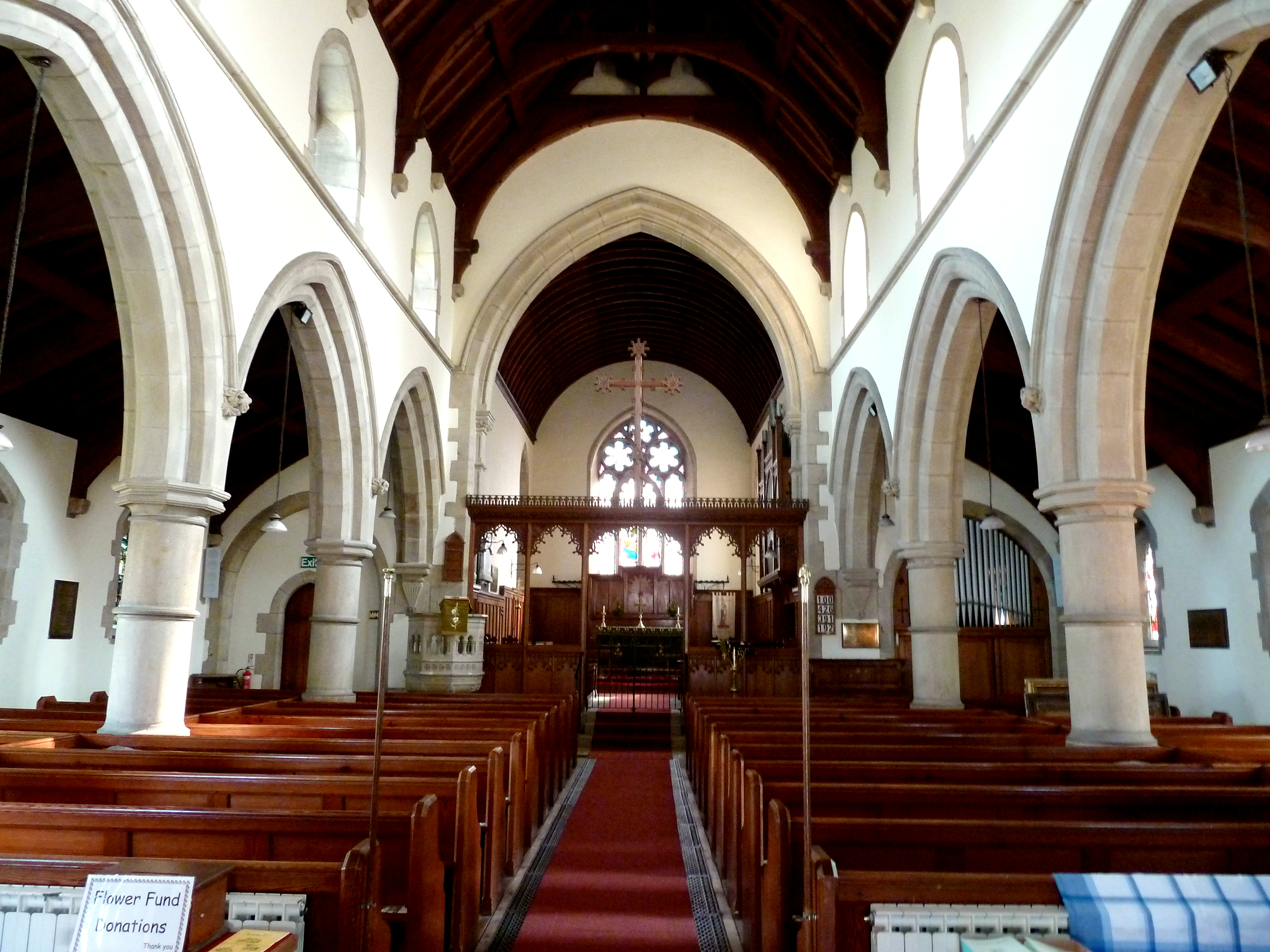
The interior, 2016

== Bibliography ==
- Waite, Colin (2000). Reflections of Killinghall: its past and its people. Killinghall, North Yorkshire: Killinghall Parish Council. p. 266. GBA107858.
