= Gawthorpe, Kirklees =

Hamlet in West Yorkshire, England

Coordinates: 53.6442°N 1.7181°W

Gawthorpe
- Location within West Yorkshire
- Civil parish: Kirkburton
- Metropolitan borough: Kirklees
- Metropolitan county: West Yorkshire
- Region: Yorkshire and the Humber
- Country: England
- Sovereign state: United Kingdom
- Post town: HUDDERSFIELD
- Postcode district: HD5
- Dialling code: 01484
- Police: West Yorkshire
- Fire: West Yorkshire
- Ambulance: Yorkshire

Gawthorpe, also known as Gawthorp, is a hamlet in the civil parish of Kirkburton, in the Kirklees district, in the county of West Yorkshire, England, about 4 miles (6 km) east of Huddersfield. The nearest major road is the A642 which passes about 0.3 miles (0.5 km) south of the place. In the 19th century Gawthorpe was listed variously as a village or a hamlet in Lepton township, part of the parish of Kirkheaton in the West Riding of Yorkshire. Coal was mined at Gawthorpe around the middle of the 19th century.

It was claimed that Chief Justice Gascoigne was born here, however, he was a native of the abandoned estate of Gawthorpe Hall near Harewood House.

== Nearby settlements ==
Nearby settlements include the town of Huddersfield, the villages of Kirkheaton and Lepton and the hamlet of Gawthorpe Green where a dyeworks and a scribbling mill were located.
