= Nidd =

Village and civil parish in North Yorkshire, England

Coordinates: 54°02′34″N 1°32′29″W

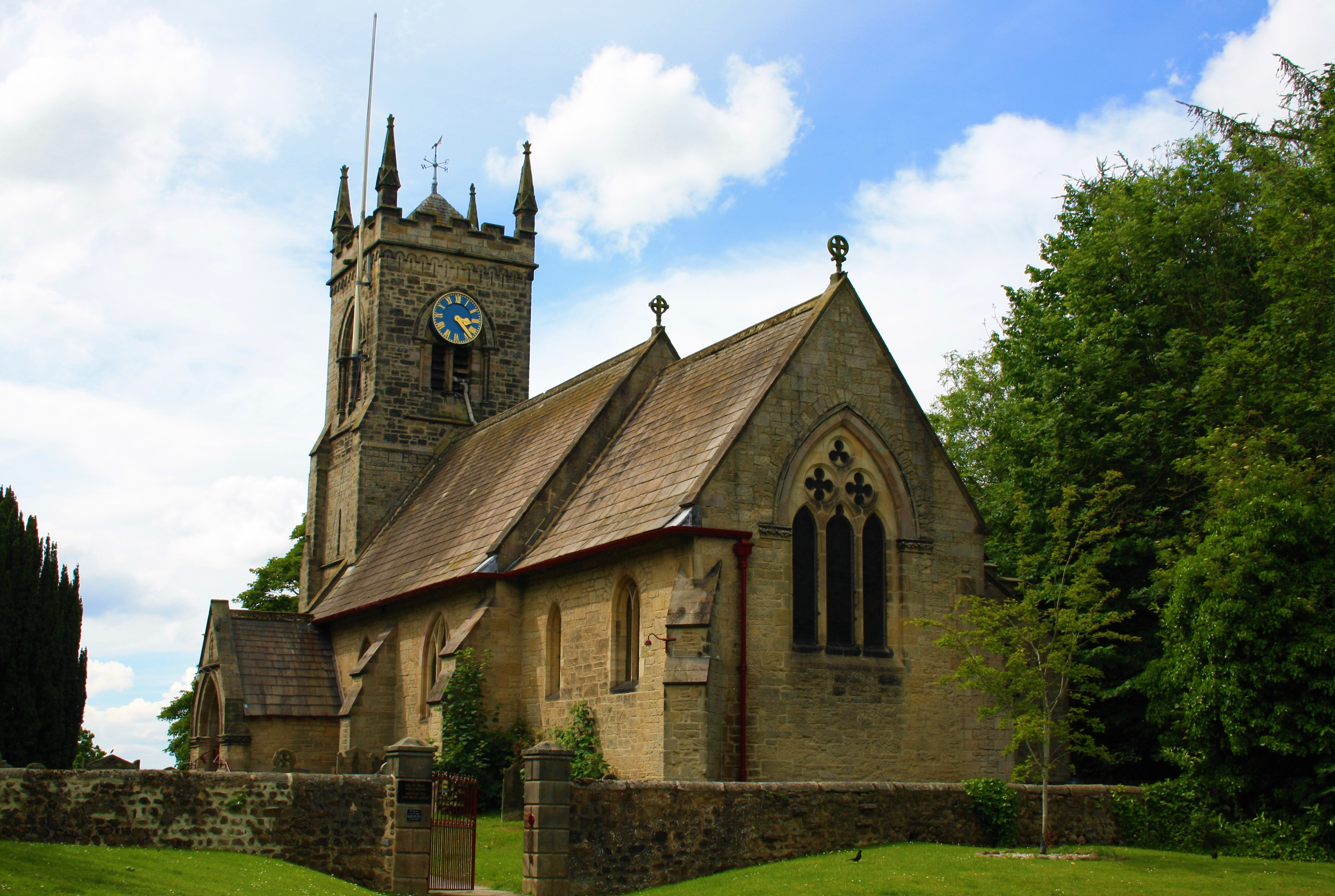
St Paul & St Margaret, Nidd

Nidd is a small village and civil parish in the county of North Yorkshire, England. The population of the village taken at the 2011 census was 168. It is situated 3 miles north of Harrogate, 1.2 miles (2 km) east of Ripley on the B6165 Pateley Bridge to Knaresborough road and near the River Nidd. The village used to have a railway station (Nidd Bridge) on the Leeds to Northallerton Railway, but this was closed down on 18 June 1962.

Until 1974 it was part of the West Riding of Yorkshire. From 1974 to 2023 it was part of the Borough of Harrogate, it is now administered by the unitary North Yorkshire Council.

The village takes its name from the River Nidd which passes through the parish. St Paul and St Margaret's Church, Nidd has a stone monument to the Rawson family, who owned Nidd Hall in the 19th, and the early part of the 20th centuries. Nidd Hall is a former country house which has been converted into a hotel.

Until 1889, Nidd was part of the Liberty of Ripon.

== See also ==
- Listed buildings in Nidd
