= The Boar's Head, Ripley =

Pub in Ripley, North Yorkshire, England

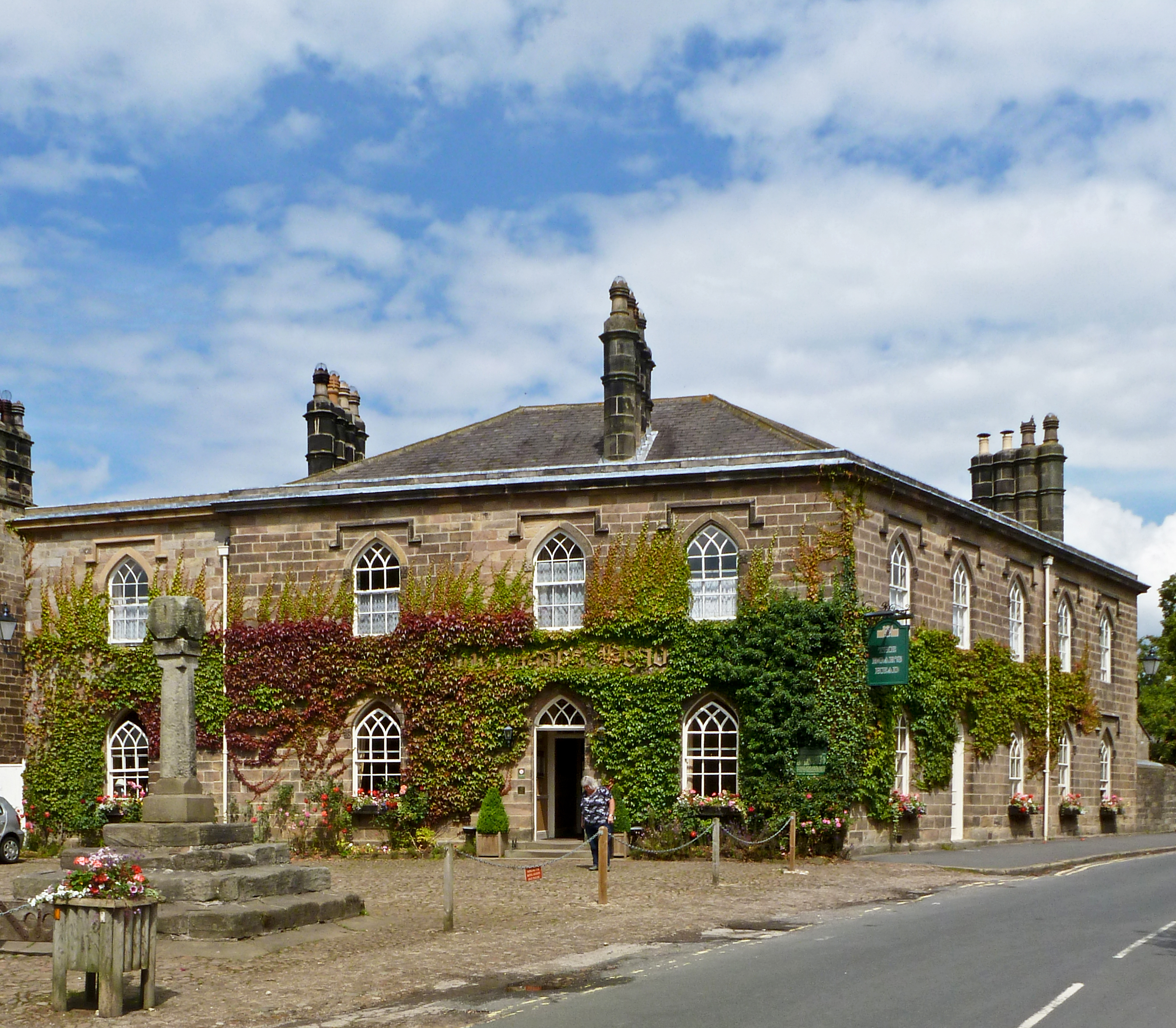
The pub, in 2012

The Boar's Head is a historic pub in Ripley, North Yorkshire, a village in England.

The building was constructed in the early 19th century, as coaching inn named "The Star", with stables to the rear. In about 1915, the inn was converted into a house, and the stables into engineering workshops. In 1990, it was reconverted into a pub. By 2025, it had a bar, lounge, restaurant, and 23 bedrooms, many of which were in an annexe. The building was grade II listed in 1966.

The pub is on a corner site. It is built of gritstone on a plinth, with a moulded eaves cornice, a shallow blocking course, and a hipped grey slate roof. It has two storeys, a front of three bays and a lower bay on the left on Market Place, and five bays on Main Street. On each front is a doorway with a pointed arch, and a double-chamfered decorated doorhead. The windows are sashes with pointed heads, and all the openings have square hood moulds. Inside, there is a stuffed boar named Boris.

== See also ==
- Listed buildings in Ripley, North Yorkshire
