= St Paul and St Margaret's Church, Nidd =

Church in Nidd, North Yorkshire, England

Coordinates: 54°02′33″N 1°32′29″W

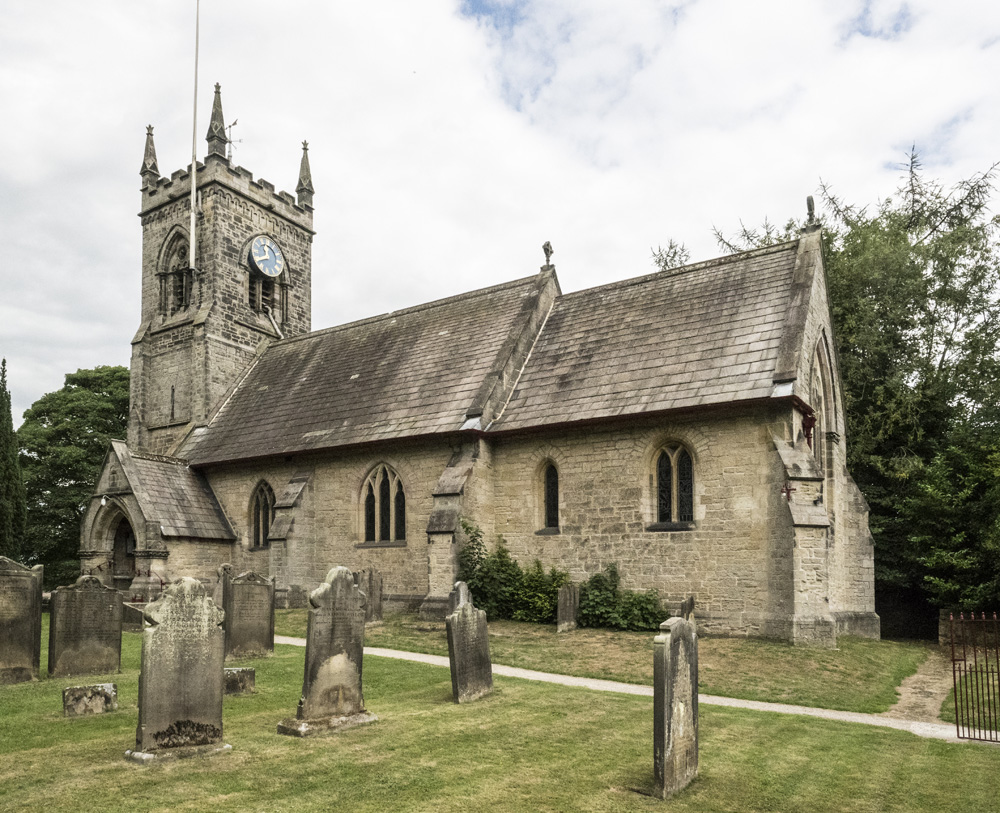
The church, in 2018

St Paul and St Margaret's Church is the parish church of Nidd, a village in North Yorkshire, in England.

There was a church in Nidd in the mediaeval period, and in 1848 it was described as "a very ancient structure". In 1851, it could accommodate 58 worshippers, and had an average attendance of 30. In 1866, the church was described as "in decay", and Miss Rawson of Nidd Hall funded its demolition and replacement. The new church was designed by Thomas Henry and Francis Healey, in the Decorated Gothic style. The building was grade II listed in 1966.

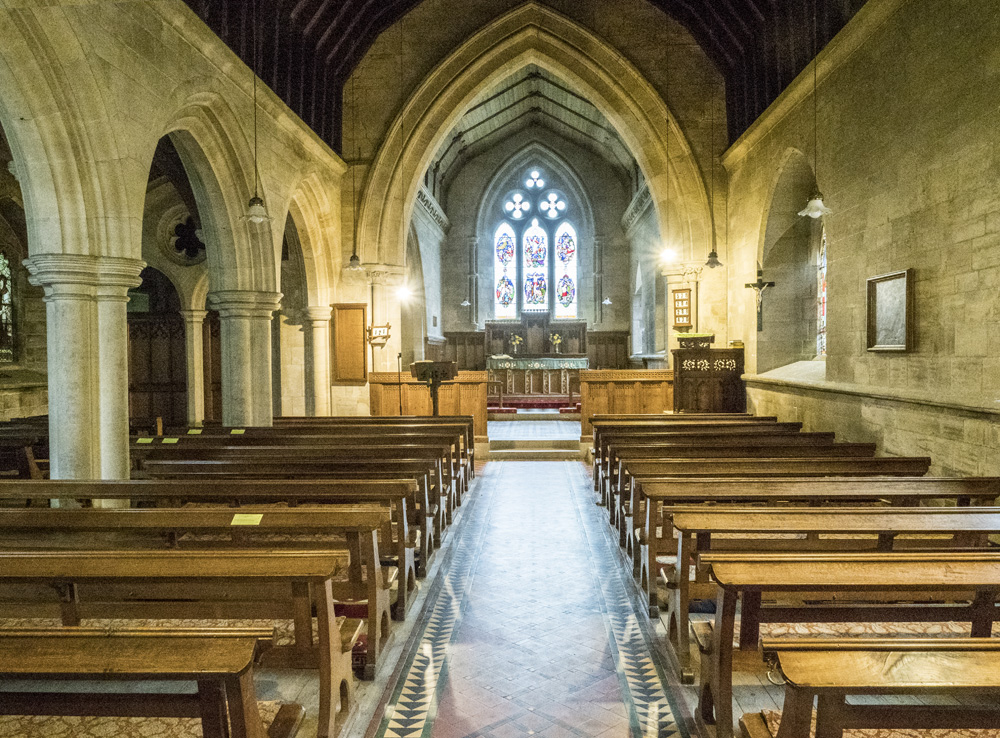
The nave and chancel

The church is built of gritstone with a grey slate roof, and consists of a nave, a north aisle added in 1908, a south porch, a chancel and a west tower. The tower has three stages, angle buttresses, lancet windows, elaborate two-light bell openings with hood moulds, a clock face, and an embattled parapet with crocketed pinnacles. The porch is gabled and has an entrance with a pointed arch and hood mould; the outer entrance may be surviving 13th-century work. Inside, the Mediaeval font survives, as do several carved stones. The wast and west windows have stained glass by William Holland, while two on the north side have glass by Charles Eamer Kempe, one described by Nikolaus Pevsner as "exceptionally good".

== See also ==
- Listed buildings in Nidd
