= Ripley Market Cross =

Market cross in Ripley, North Yorkshire, England

Coordinates: 54°02′24″N 1°34′04″W

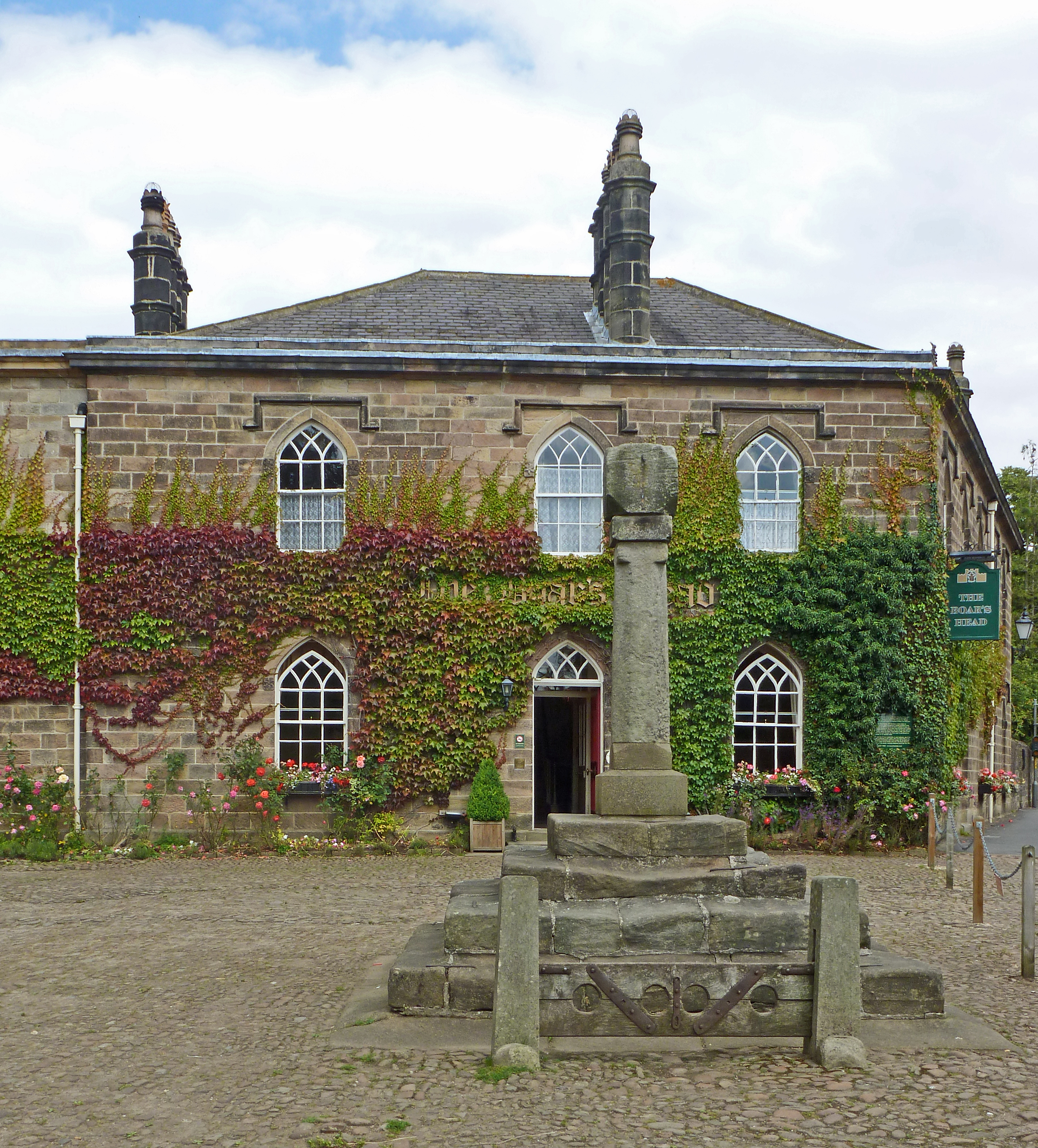
The cross, in 2012

Ripley Market Cross, also known as the Village Cross, is a historic structure in Ripley, North Yorkshire, a village in England.

Ripley was granted a market charter in 1357, to hold a market every Monday. A market cross was erected probably in the 15th century, of which the steps survive. In the 17th or 18th century, a sundial on a shaft was erected atop the steps. The market had ended by the Victorian period, but several fairs were still held each year. The cross was grade II listed in 1966, and it is also a scheduled monument, together with the adjacent stocks.

The cross is made of gritstone, and has four tiers of square steps, the lowest of which is 3 metres wide. On the steps is a square base. On this is a 1.25-metre chamfered shaft surmounted by a square slab carrying a sundial, consisting of a cubiform block with chamfered corners and the remains of a gnomon on each face.

== See also ==
- Listed buildings in Ripley, North Yorkshire
