= Ripley Town Hall, North Yorkshire =

Municipal building in Ripley, North Yorkshire, England

Ripley Town Hall
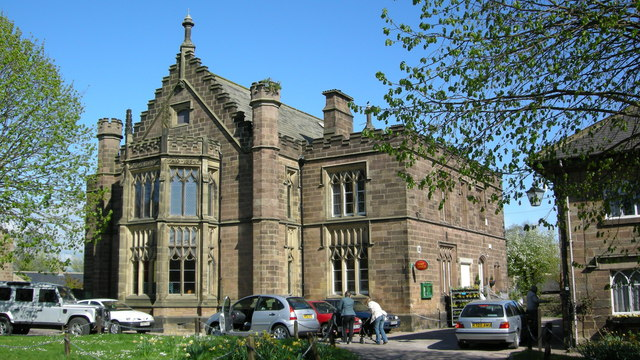
- Ripley Town Hall

- Shown in North Yorkshire
- 54.0406°N 1.5666°W
- Location: Main Street, Ripley

History
- Built: 1854

Site notes
- Architectural style: Gothic Revival style

Listed Building – Grade II
- Official name: Post Office, Town Hall
- Designated: 15 March 1966
- Reference no.: 1174009

Ripley Town Hall is a municipal building in Main Street, Ripley, North Yorkshire, England. The structure, which is used as an events venue and as a post office, is a grade II listed building.

== History ==
In the mid-19th century the lord of the manor, Sir William Amcotts-Ingilby, developed a plan to redevelop Ripley in the style of an Alsatian village; the final building in his plan was the town hall which he wanted to resemble a French "Hôtel de Ville". The new building was designed in the Gothic Revival style, built in ashlar stone and was completed in late 1854.

The design involved a symmetrical main frontage with three bays facing onto Main Street; the central bay featured a two-tier canted bay window with tracery and a crenelated parapet inscribed with the words "Hôtel de Ville 1854". The central bay was flanked by corner turrets and was surmounted by a stepped gable with a commemorative plaque, held in place by the figure of an angel. The plaque recorded the fact that, while Amcotts-Ingilby initiated the project, his wife completed it following his death in May 1854. The outer bays, which were recessed and crenelated, featured three-light windows with tracery on both floors. Internally, the principal rooms were the main assembly hall and an ante-room.

In the 19th century, the building was used as venue for public meetings and for meetings of the local literary institution. It continued to operate as a community events venue for throughout the 20th century, and an upper floor was installed in the building in the 1960s to allow more social functions to take place. A post office was also established in the right-hand side bay.

Activity significantly increased after the local promotor, Andy Herrington, established the Ripley Blues Club there in the late 1990s: one of the first performers he attracted was the blues band, Nine Below Zero, in September 1999. An extensive programme of refurbishment works, financed by bodies which included the Heritage Lottery Fund, was completed in 2004. The works received recognition from the Duke of York's Community Initiative Award in 2007 and, following the re-opening of the town hall, later performers there included the American singer-songwriter, Steve Cropper, in November 2014, the rock band, Magna Carta, in September 2017 and the pub rock band, Dr. Feelgood, in December 2017.

== See also ==
- Listed buildings in Ripley, North Yorkshire
