= Nidd Bridge railway station =

Disused railway station in North Yorkshire, England

Nidd Bridge
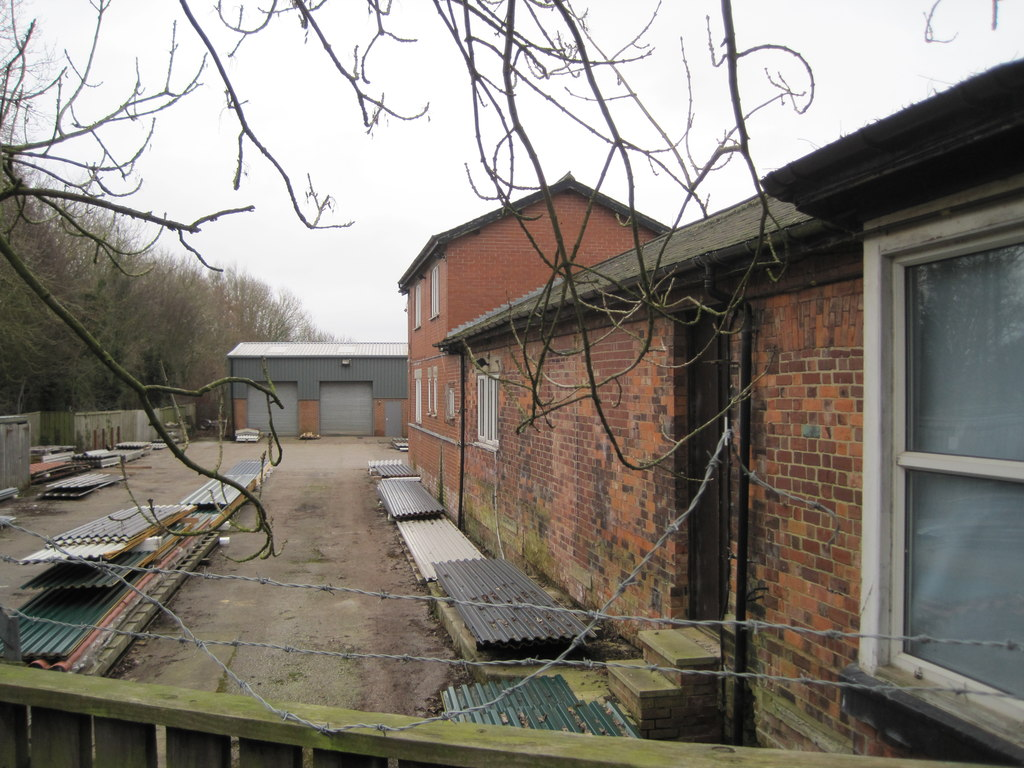
- View south from the former level crossing. Former station building with modern extensions.

General information
- Location: Nidd, North Yorkshire; England
- Coordinates: 54.034262°N 1.543382°W
- Grid reference: SE300599
- Platforms: 2

Other information
- Status: Disused

History
- Original company: Leeds Northern Railway
- Pre-grouping: Leeds Northern Railway; North Eastern Railway
- Post-grouping: LNER; British Railways (North Eastern)

Key dates
- 1 June 1848: Opened as Ripley
- 1 June 1862: Name changed to Nidd Bridge
- 18 June 1962: Closed to passengers
- 10 August 1964: Closed completely
Location

Nidd Bridge railway station served the villages of Ripley and Nidd in North Yorkshire (then in the West Riding of Yorkshire), England from 1848 to 1964 on the Leeds-Northallerton Railway.

== History ==
The station was opened as Ripley station on 1 June 1848 by the Leeds and Thirsk Railway. It was situated on the south side of the road from Ripley to Knaresborough, now the B6165. The goods yard was behind the down platform, which consisted of four sidings. One passed through the goods yard, one served a 5-ton crane and two docks, one was alongside the line and the goods line and the other was behind the down platform. Until the Nidd Valley Railway was opened in 1862, the station was the railhead for Nidderdale, and a horse-drawn omnibus ran from the station to Pateley Bridge.

Its name was changed to Nidd Bridge on 1 June 1862, when a new station was opened nearer Ripley (on the new Nidd Valley Railway), and was named Ripley station (later renamed Ripley Valley station). It cost £411 for this change to happen. The main freight handled at the station was timber (155 tons). 105 wagons of livestock were also dispatched in 1911. The station was closed to passengers on 18 June 1962 and to goods traffic on 10 August 1964.

Preceding station	Historical railways	Following station
Wormald Green; Line and station closed	Leeds Northern Railway; Leeds-Northallerton Railway	Starbeck; Line closed, station open
