= Listed buildings in Ripley, North Yorkshire =

Ripley is a civil parish in the county of North Yorkshire, England. It contains 56 listed buildings that are recorded in the National Heritage List for England. Of these, two are listed at Grade I, the highest of the three grades, four are at Grade II*, the middle grade, and the others are at Grade II, the lowest grade. The parish contains the country house Ripley Castle, the model village of Ripley, and the surrounding countryside. The house is listed, together with adjoining structures and buildings in the gardens, grounds and parkland. Most of the listed buildings in the village are houses and cottages, and the others include a church with items in the churchyard, a shop, a town hall, a school, a village cross, a public house, a set of stocks, a war memorial, a drinking fountain, and a telephone kiosk. Outside these, the listed buildings include bridges, a cross base, a farmhouse and associated building, and a milepost.

== Key ==
Grade	Criteria
I	Buildings of exceptional interest, sometimes considered to be internationally important
II*	Particularly important buildings of more than special interest
II	Buildings of national importance and special interest

== Buildings ==
Name and location	Photograph	Date	Notes	Grade
Market cross 54.03990°N 1.56782°W		Medieval	The oldest part of the cross is the steps, with the shaft probably dating from the 17th century. The cross is in gritstone, and has four tiers of square steps, on which is a square base. On this is a chamfered shaft surmounted by a square slab carrying a sundial, consisting of a cubiform block with chamfered corners and the remains of a gnomon on each face.	II
Cross base and shaft near High Rails Farmhouse; 54.04081°N 1.58693°W		Medieval (probable)	The cross is in gritstone, and consists of a cross base and part of a shaft. There are two tiers of steps, and the base is a square block. The shaft is chamfered on all four corners, and is set into a socket on the base.	II
Weeping Cross; 54.03987°N 1.56874°W		Medieval	The cross base is in the churchyard of St Andrew's Church, to the north of the church. It is in gritstone, about 1.5 metres (4 ft 11 in) in height, and consists of two circular blocks of stone. In the lower block are eight recesses with segmental lower edges, and continuous moulding. The upper stone is smaller, it has slightly inward-bowed sides, and on the top is a rectangular cavity.	II*
All Saints' Church; 54.03974°N 1.56892°W		c. 1400	The church has been altered and extended through the centuries, it was largely rebuilt in 1567, and restored in 1862. The church is built in gritstone with grey slate roofs, and consists of a nave with a clerestory, north and south aisles, north and south porches, a chancel with a Patrons' Choir to the north, and a south chapel with an organ and vestry to the south, and a west tower. The tower has two stages, diagonal buttresses, and an oblong stair tower on the south. It contains a three-light west window with trefoil heads, two-light bell openings with chamfered mullions, and an embattled parapet.	II*
Gatehouse, Ripley Castle; 54.03998°N 1.56990°W		c. 1450	The gatehouse is in stone on a plinth, with embattled parapets, the central bay with a lead roof, and the wings with grey slate roofs. The central bay has three storeys, and is flanked by lower two-storey bays. In the central bay is a tall pointed moulded arch, and to the left is a pedestrian entrance; both are decorated with ribs and trefoil arcading, and have boar's heads handles. Above the main arch is a limestone plaque with a coat of arms, and above that is a three-light window, the lights with cinquefoil heads. The outer bays contain single-light windows.	I
Outbuilding north of Newton Hall Farmhouse; 54.04929°N 1.56001°W	—	16th century	The outbuilding is in gritstone, with some internal timber framing, and a stone slate roof. There is a single storey, two bays and a cellar. On the north front is a segmental-arched doorway with chamfered quoins and a large lintel. On the right return, steps lead up to a doorway, and in the apex of the gable is a small stone shield. The windows are mullioned.	II
Tower and walls southwest of Ripley Castle; 54.03926°N 1.57093°W	—	16th century (possible)	The tower is the older part, it is in pink-grey gritstone, about 4 metres (13 ft) square and has two or three storeys. It contains a narrow opening with a pointed arch, and has a moulded eaves band and an embattled parapet. The wall dates from the 19th century, it is in gritstone, about 400 metres (1,300 ft) in length and 2.5 metres (8 ft 2 in) in height, and has a coped embattled parapet.	II
Ripley Castle; 54.04023°N 1.57043°W		1555	A country house in gritstone with roofs of grey slate and stone slate. The earliest part is the tower, with most of the rest of the buildings added between 1783 and 1786. The tower, at the southwest corner, has two storeys, and fronts of one and two bays. There are diagonal buttresses, a stair turret, and embattled parapets. To its right is a two-storey range ending in a three-storey wing with fronts of three bays , and to the north is an L-shaped kitchen and service wing.	I
Newton Hall Farmhouse; 54.04918°N 1.56014°W		c. 1600	The farmhouse, which was remodelled in about 1850, is in magnesian limestone, with gritstone dressings, quoins, and a stone slate roof. There are two storeys and fronts of three and two bays. The central doorway has an eared architrave and a cornice, and above it is a panel containing coats of arms and shields. The windows are sashes.	II
Killinghall Bridge; 54.03227°N 1.56288°W		17th century (or earlier)	The bridge, which crosses, the River Nidd has been replaced by a later bridge upstream. It is in gritstone and consists of two segmental arches crossing the river, and four similar arches to the north. There is a massive cutwater on the upstream side rising as a pilaster, and similar pilasters between most arches. The parapet projects slightly, and has flat coping.	II
Stocks; 54.03988°N 1.56782°W		17th century (possible)	The stocks in Market Place consist of two gritstone uprights about 60 centimetres (24 in) in height with grooves on the inner faces. Between them are two pieces of wood with four circular holes, fastened by iron staples.	II
Tower Bridge; 54.03914°N 1.57107°W		17th century (possible)	The bridge, which was rebuilt in the 19th century, carries Hollybank Lane over Ripley Beck. It is in gritstone and consists of a double-chamfered single segmental arch. The parapet is coped with large chamfered blocks linked by iron staples.	II
Pair of table tombs 54.03974°N 1.56938°W	—	1723	The table tombs are in the churchyard of St Andrew's Church, to the west of the church. The left tomb is the older, and consists of a slab with moulded edges, and six pillars, each with a moulded base, cap and central band. The inscription is deeply cut. The later tomb is dated 1781 and 1800, and consists of a slab with moulded edges, standing on six Tuscan-style columns, and has an instructive inscription.	II
Gravestone; 54.03981°N 1.56946°W	—	1746	The gravestone in the churchyard of St Andrew's Church, to the west of the church, commemorates Thomas Chippendale. It is in gritstone, and consists of an upright slab about 80 centimetres (31 in) in height. There is egg and dart moulding to the edges and to the triangular pediment, which contains a winged head. On the gravestone is a weathered inscription.	II
Dacre House, Oak House, and Oak Cottage; 54.03951°N 1.56797°W		Mid to late 18th century	A pair of houses and a cottage, at one time an inn, in gritstone, with quoins, a ground floor sill band, and an M-shaped grey slate roof with gable copings. There are two storeys, a double depth plan, six bays, and a single storey single-bay extension on the left. On the front are two doorways, each under a flat hood on console brackets. The windows are sashes, those in the ground floor with tie-stone jambs.	II
Glebe House; 54.03929°N 1.56789°W	—	Mid to late 18th century	The house is in gritstone, with quoins, and a grey slate roof with gable copings and shaped kneelers. There are two storeys and three bays, and a two-bay rear wing. The central doorway has an architrave, and the windows are sashes in architraves with quoined jambs.	II
Chantry House; 54.04003°N 1.56815°W		Late 18th century	The house is in gritstone, with quoins, a modillion eaves cornice, a shallow blocking course, and a grey slate roof with gable copings. There are two storeys and three bays, and a single-bay extension on the left. The central doorway has Tuscan pilasters, an entablature and a cornice. The windows are sashes, on the ground floor with architraves, and on the upper floor slightly recessed with quoined jambs.	II
Brewhouse and laundry block, Ripley Castle; 54.04073°N 1.56985°W	—	Late 18th century (probable)	The building, to the north of the house, is in gritstone with stone slate roofs. The central laundry block has two storeys and three bays, and a pyramidal roof with a louvred ventilator, and it contains a doorway, sash windows and fixed windows. The flanking wings have one storey, two bays and hipped roofs. Both wings contain doorways, the left wing has casement windows, and on the right wing the windows are sashes.	II
Dairy range, Ripley Castle; 54.04071°N 1.57018°W	—	Late 18th century (probable)	The building, to the north of the house, is in gritstone and limestone with a stone slate roof. There is a single storey and 15 bays, the central bay projecting and containing a door and windows under a segmental arch, an eaves band, and a coped gable forming a pediment. The outer bays contain doorways and windows. At the rear is a central cambered archway flanked by narrower round arches with large voussoirs forming an open loggia.	II
Ha-ha, Ripley Castle; 54.04294°N 1.56941°W	—	Late 18th century (probable)	The ha-ha wall to the north of the house is in grey gritstone with projecting coping stones. It extends for about 600 metres (2,000 ft), with the boat house at the south end and a gateway at the north end. The wall divides the gardens and arboretum from the deer park.	II
Scarah Bridge; 54.04932°N 1.58064°W		Late 18th century	The bridge carries the B6165 road over Thornton Beck. It is in gritstone, and consists of a central segmental arch flanked by lower side arches, all with recessed voussoirs. The bridge has triangular cutwaters, and a slightly projecting parapet with rounded coping.	II
Terrace walls, Ripley Castle; 54.04012°N 1.57083°W		c. 1780 (probable)	The walls enclosing the terrace to the north, west and south of the house are in gritstone. They have a moulded string course and embattled parapets. At the corners and ends are low square projections.	II
Orangery, walls, botheys, glasshouse and pavilions, Ripley Castle; 54.04194°N 1.56791°W		c. 1785 (possible)	Some of the included items were added later. The orangery is in gritstone, and has a single story and fronts of five and two bays. On the front is a central doorway with a fanlight and full-height round-arched windows, between which are fluted ionic pilasters and a moulded entablature, a modillion cornice, and a parapet with vase balusters. The orangery is flanked by coped walls ending in two-bay pavilions in a similar style to the orangery. On the north side of the walls are lean-to botheys and garden stores.	II*
Temple north of Ripley Castle; 54.04448°N 1.56910°W		c.1785 (possible)	A folly in the form of a prostyle temple in the grounds to the north of the house. It is in gritstone with quoins, and a grey-purple slate roof. It is approached by two moulded steps, and has four Ionic columns, an entablature, a modillion eaves cornice and a pediment. On the returns are Ionic pilasters.	II
Stables, coach-houses and service buildings, Ripley Castle; 54.04052°N 1.56995°W		1786	The buildings are in gritstone with floor bands and a grey slate roof, and form two ranges at right angles. The north range has two storeys and 15 bays, the outer bays taller and embattled, and the middle three bays canted and embattled. The east range has a central gateway flanked by two-storey square towers, linked by lower two-storey five-bay ranges to two-storey end towers.	II*
Sundial, Ripley Castle; 54.04031°N 1.56977°W		Late 18th or early 19th century	The sundial in the centre of the east courtyard of the house is in pale gritstone, and is about 1.5 metres (4 ft 11 in) in height. It has a two-tier circular base, on which is a vase baluster with diagonal fluting. This is surmounted by a marble capstone with an inscribed bronze gnomon.	II
Gate and gate piers south of west pavilion, Ripley Castle; 54.04153°N 1.56894°W	—	1817–18 (probable)	The gate piers are in stone and about 5 metres (16 ft) high. Each pier has a plinth, a cornice and a ball and cushion finial. The gates and overthrow are in wrought iron, the gates with arrow finials, and the overthrow with scrolls and a central star in a roundel.	II
Curbing to raised flower bed, Ripley Castle; 54.04173°N 1.56740°W	—	1820–40	The flower bed is to the southeast of the orangery in the garden of the house, and probably originated as a pool surround. The curbing is in gritstone and circular, with a diameter of about 10 metres (33 ft). It consists of moulded curb stones on a stone plinth about 40 centimetres (16 in) in height.	II
Church View and Garden Cottage; 54.04005°N 1.56839°W		Early 19th century (probable)	A pair of cottages in gritstone with a floor band, deep eaves and a hipped Westmorland slate roof. There are two storeys and two bays. In the centre are paired doorways with four-centred arched heads and a shared square hood mould. Outside the doorways, on each floor, is a flat-headed chamfered mullioned window, with three four-centred arched lights under hood moulds.	II
Milepost; 54.04376°N 1.56022°W		Early 19th century	The milepost is on the south side of the A61 road. It is in cast iron, about 80 centimetres (31 in) in height, and has a triangular plan and a sloping top. On the top is the distance to Leeds, and on the sides are pointing hands, with the distance to Harrogate on the left side and to Ripon on the right side.	II
Ripley School; 54.04069°N 1.56752°W		1830	The school is in gritstone with a projecting eaves band and a grey slate roof. There is a single storey and fronts of four and two bays. In the centre is a projecting porch, and the windows are flat-headed with chamfered surrounds, and two four-centred arched lights, under a hood mould. Above is an inscribed and dated limestone plaque in an oval frame.	II
School House; 54.04069°N 1.56718°W		1830	The house is in gritstone, with pilaster strips, a moulded eaves cornice, a low blocking course, and a hipped grey slate roof. There are two storeys and three bays, the middle bay projecting slightly. In the centre is a doorway with a deeply recessed door in a moulded surround with a traceried fanlight, and a doorhead with an ogee head and crockets. The windows are mullioned with two four-centred arched lights and hood moulds.	II
1–5 Main Street; 54.04039°N 1.56698°W		Early to mid-19th century	A house and four cottages in gritstone on a plinth, with deep eaves and a hipped grey slate roof. There are two storeys, the house on the left has two bays, and each cottage has one bay. The house has a central doorway, and each cottage has a doorway to the right, all with hood moulds. All the windows have three lights with intersecting tracery and a hood mould.	II
Outbuilding behind 5 Main Street; 54.04024°N 1.56694°W	—	Early to mid-19th century	Ordinally a wash house, it is in gritstone, with a projecting eaves band and a hipped grey slate roof. There is a single storey and a square plan, and it contains a doorway to the left and a rectangular three-light window with intersecting tracery.	II
6–10 Main Street; 54.04011°N 1.56722°W		Early to mid-19th century	A house and four cottages in gritstone on a plinth, with deep eaves and a hipped grey slate roof. There are two storeys, the house on the right has two bays, and each cottage has one bay. The house has a central doorway, and each cottage has a doorway to the left, all with hood moulds. All the windows have three lights with intersecting tracery and a hood mould.	II
Outbuilding behind 6 Main Street; 54.04017°N 1.56699°W	—	Early to mid-19th century	Ordinally a wash house, it is in gritstone, with a projecting eaves band and a hipped grey slate roof. There is a single storey and a square plan, and it contains a doorway to the right and a rectangular three-light window with intersecting tracery.	II
Birchwood Farmhouse; 54.03987°N 1.56740°W		Early to mid-19th century	The farmhouse is in gritstone on a plinth, with a moulded eaves cornice, a shallow blocking course, and a hipped Westmorland slate roof. There are two storeys and three bays. Steps lead up to the central doorway that has a pointed head with a glazed fanlight, and a decorated doorhead. The windows are sashes with pointed heads and interlaced glazing, and all the openings have square hood moulds.	II
Castle Close and wall 54.04007°N 1.56862°W		Early to mid-19th century	The house and wall are in gritstone. The house has a plinth, a moulded eaves cornice, a shallow blocking course, and a hipped Westmorland slate roof. There are two storeys and three bays, and a single-bay extension on the left. Steps lead up to the central doorway that has a pointed head with a glazed fanlight, and a decorated doorhead. The windows are sashes with pointed heads and interlaced glazing, and all the openings have square hood moulds. The wall extends for about 10 metres (33 ft) to the left, it is about 2.5 metres (8 ft 2 in) in height and is embattled, with flat coping stones.	II
Estate Cottages; 54.04054°N 1.56730°W	—	Early to mid-19th century	A terrace of four cottages with a floor band, deep eaves and a hipped grey slate roof. There are two storeys and four bays. The doorways have a four-centred arched head, and the windows are mullioned with three lights. The upper floor windows each has a square hood mould, and on the ground floor the hood moulds are above each doorway and the adjacent window.	II
Horngarth; 54.03938°N 1.56751°W	—	Early to mid-19th century	The house is in gritstone on a plinth, with a moulded eaves cornice, a shallow blocking course, and a hipped grey slate roof. There are two storeys, fronts of three bays, and two-bay rear range. In the centre is a doorway with a pointed head, a glazed fanlight, and a decorated doorhead. Above the doorway is a blind window, and the other windows are sashes with pointed heads and interlaced glazing, and all the openings have square hood moulds.	II
South View; 54.03943°N 1.56656°W	—	Early to mid-19th century	A row of five gritstone cottages with a grey slate roof, and gable copings. There are two storeys and five gabled bays. The doorways have an ogee doorhead and a hood mould, and the windows are mullioned with three four-centred arched heads, and hood moulds.	II
Sunnyside, outbuilding and archway 54.03936°N 1.56699°W	—	Early to mid-19th century	A stable range converted into outbuildings and two houses. It is in gritstone with a projecting eaves band, and a grey slate roof, hipped on the left and gabled on the right. There are two storeys and seven bays. The doorways have pointed arches, and between them are pointed-arched recesses. The windows are a mix of horizontally sliding sashes and casements. To the right is a cambered archway with a flat-coped parapet.	II
The Boar's Head; 54.04004°N 1.56779°W		Early to mid-19th century	The public house on a corner site, originally the Star Inn, is in gritstone on a plinth, with a moulded eaves cornice, a shallow blocking course, and a hipped grey slate roof. There are two storeys, a front of three bays and a lower bay on the left on Market Place, and five bays on Main Street. On each front is a doorway with a pointed arch, and a double-chamfered decorated doorhead. The windows are sashes with pointed heads, and all the openings have square hood moulds.	II
Former stables and outbuildings, The Boar's Head; 54.04031°N 1.56794°W		Early to mid-19th century	The former stable, later used for other purposes, flanking the garden of the Boar's Head public house, is in gritstone with a hipped grey slate roof. There are two storeys and an L-shaped plan, with a main range of about eight bays, and a two-bay wing at right angles. The doorways and windows have round-arched heads.	II
Town Hall Cottages; 54.04089°N 1.56652°W		Early to mid-19th century	A terrace of a house and three cottages in gritstone with a grey slate roof. There are two storeys and five bays, each bay with a coped gable containing a cruciform recess. The doorways have a moulded surround, an ogee head and a square hood mould, and the windows have chamfered surrounds, pointed heads and square hood moulds.	II
Vale Lodge; 54.04092°N 1.56699°W	—	Early to mid-19th century	The house is in gritstone on a plinth, with a moulded eaves cornice, a shallow blocking course, and a hipped grey slate roof. There are two storeys and three bays. Steps lead up to a central doorway that has a pointed head, a traceried fanlight, and a decorated doorhead. The windows are sashes with pointed heads and interlaced glazing. All the openings have square hood moulds.	II
Village Shop, Wood Close and Wath House; 54.03965°N 1.56743°W		Early to mid-19th century	A row of three houses and a shop in gritstone, with an eaves cornice and a hipped grey slate roof. There are two storeys and ten bays. The shop in the left bay has shop windows on the ground floor, and paired sash windows with pointed heads above. Each house has three bays, a central doorway approached by steps with a pointed head, and a traceried fanlight. The windows are sashes with pointed heads, and all the openings have square hood moulds.	II
York House; 54.03914°N 1.56840°W		Early to mid-19th century	A rectory, later a private house, it is rendered on a stone plinth, with deep modillion eaves, and a stone slate roof. There are two storeys and eight bays, the middle four bays under an open pediment containing a circular window. On the front are two doorways, one false, with semicircular fanlights. The windows are sashes; those in the middle four bays have wedge lintels with recessed panels. On the left return is a two-storey semicircular bow window with sashes.	II
Boathouse, Ripley Castle; 54.04050°N 1.57142°W	—	1843–44	The disused boathouse in the grounds of the house is in gritstone, and has a rectangular plan. It is built into the ground, and is approached by a flight of stone steps and a doorway. The entrance from the lake is through a cambered arch with a vermiculated rusticated surround and flat stone coping.	II
Weir and bridge between Ripley Lakes; 54.04354°N 1.57519°W		1843–44 (probable)	The bridge carries a carriage drive between the two lakes in the grounds of Ripley Castle. It is in gritstone and consists of three segmental arches with rusticated voussoirs, and roll moulding at roadway level, and it has a cast iron balustrade. The weir has five tiers.	II
Weir, basin and footbridge at the outlet of Ripley Lakes; 54.03924°N 1.57119°W		1843–44	The footbridge crossing the outlet of the lakes is in cast iron, and consists of a single shallow arch. The weir and the basin lining are in gritstone blocks. The weir is horseshoe-shaped, and the basin is about 3 metres (9.8 ft) deep.	II
Deer shed, Ripley Castle; 54.03944°N 1.57737°W	—	1852	The building in the deer park of the house is in gritstone, with a hipped pantile roof, and a single storey. The northern wall is built as a four-sided bay, and the other walls are straight. At the south end is a full-height opening, and the east side has two paired full-height openings with pillars. A buttress to the south has an inscription and the date.	II
Town Hall; 54.04062°N 1.56665°W		1854	The town hall is in gritstone on a moulded plinth, with first-floor and eaves string courses, embattled parapets, and a grey slate roof. Steps lead up to the entrance in the north front, that has an embattled porch with angle buttresses, crocketted finials and animal motifs. On the front facing the street is a large two-storey canted bay window, octagonal corner turrets and a crow-stepped gable. On the left return is a massive five-light Perpendicular window.	II
Drinking Fountain with statue 54.03968°N 1.56798°W		1907	The drinking fountain has a gritstone plinth, its narrower side faces the street. It has an inscription and the date, and is flanked by taps and cup hooks. Surmounting the plinth is a statue of a boar in limestone, probably dating from the 18th century.	II
War memorial 54.03992°N 1.56812°W		c. 1920	The war memorial in Market Place consists of a sandstone pillar with a gabled top, on an octagonal base on three square steps. On opposite sides of the pillar are bronze plaques with inscriptions, the names of those lost in the two World Wars, and those who served and survived.	II
Telephone kiosk 54.04052°N 1.56683°W		1935	The K6 type telephone kiosk in Main Street was designed by Giles Gilbert Scott. Constructed in cast iron with a square plan and a dome, it has three unperforated crowns in the top panels.	II
