= Natural Acoustic Band =

British acid-folk band

- Origin: Milngavie, Glasgow, Scotland
- Genres: Acid-folk
- Years active: 1969–1975
- Labels: RCA
- Past members: Tom Hoy, Robin Thyne, Krysia Kocjan
- Website: naturalacousticband.com

The Natural Acoustic Band were a British acid-folk band, formed in 1969 in Milngavie, Glasgow, Scotland. There were a number of personnel changes throughout the band's history, but the best known line up was:

- Tom Hoy (born 5 February 1950, in Glasgow, Scotland) — Guitar and Vocals
- Robin Thyne (born 1 November 1950, in Newcastle upon Tyne, England) — Guitar, Bongos, Bass and Tenor Recorders, Tambourine, Clacker and Vocals
- Krysia Kocjan (10 August 1953, in Craigendoran, Scotland, – 21 February 2007 in Portland, Oregon, United States) — Vocals, Guitar, Glockenspiel, Bells

The band only produced two albums and one single (reaching No 1 in the Melody Maker folk charts). They played The Royal Albert Hall (supporting Don McLean), toured extensively with Ralph McTell, played at The Weeley Festival Rod Stewart, T-Rex, Status Quo, Rory Gallagher and Monty Python also appearing with Country Joe McDonald at Reading Played Glasgow City Halls with Billy Connolly and Stealers Wheel, The Old Grey Whistle Test with Alice Cooper, and they were on the bill on three occasions at London's Marquee Club: November 17, 1971 (supported by Shape of the Rain), 12 April 1972 (supported by Gnidrolog) and on 22 November 1972 (supporting Brewers Droop).

== Later years of the NAB ==
As a replacement for Krysia Kocjan the NAB had at first recruited Joanna Carlin but she never recorded with them. She was actually called Melanie Harrold but was trying to avoid confusion with the better known Melanie (Melanie Safka). She later made singles and solo albums (under both her names) and worked with the Albion Band and members of Steeleye Span.

The NAB continued as a duo comprising Hoy and Thyne until 1975, when Hoy joined Magna Carta. Thyne also joined this band at a later stage.

== Discography ==
=== Albums ===
- Learning to Live (RCA SF 8272)

Track Listing :
1. Learning To Live
2. Sometimes I Could Believe In You
3. Subway Cinderella
4. Free
5. Tom
6. February Feeling
7. Maybe It Was The Sunshine
8. Midnight Study
9. All I Want Is Your Love
10. Waiting For The Rain
11. Dying Bird
12. High In My Head

- Branching In (RCA SF 8314)

Track Listing :
1. Running Into Changes (T Hoy, K Kocjan)
2. Echoes (Hoy, Kocjan)
3. Money (Kocjan)
4. Follow Your Love (Hoy)
5. Road to the Sun (Kocjan)
6. Is it True Blue ? (There's nothing unnatural about electricity) (Hoy)
7. First Boy (Kocjan, Hoy)
8. I'll Carry You (Hoy)
9. Little Leaf (Kocjan)
10.Moontime Writer (Kocjan)
11.Travellers on the Road (R Thyne)
Produced by Milton Okun

- Both albums now available on C.D.

=== Singles ===
- "Echoes" / "Is It True Blue ?" (RCA RCA 2324)

== Later careers ==
=== Krysia Kocjan (Krysia Kristianne) ===
Krysia Kocjan went on to provide backing vocals for Al Stewart, The Kinks, Mike Heron and many others. She made a solo album Krysia in 1974 (RCA LPL1 5052) with musicians including some Fairport Convention/Fotheringay members (specifically Jerry Donahue, Dave Pegg, Dave Mattacks) - and also Rabbit Bundrick, and renowned percussionist Ray Cooper. On one track she revived her youthful talent for setting romantic English poetry to music with John Keats' La Belle Dame Sans Merci. Al Stewart's backing group, led by Peter White with Kocjan as a member, chose the name Shot In The Dark and released an album with the same title in 1981 (RSO 2394 297). On this Kocjan used her occasional alternative name of Krysia Kristianne and her few solo lead vocals here include "Some Towns".

She later moved to the US and in 1995 sang the track "The Lament" on the CD A Celtic Tale - The Legend of Deirdre by Mychael and Jeff Danna, a performance which drew review phrases such as "crystalline soprano" and "most moving" on Amazon.

In 1996 came the CD Tyger and Other Tales (Sentience Records 70002) with Leslie Chew and David Kronemyer which revived the Keats work along with ten other romantic English poems set to music. Her own favourite of these was "Complaint of the Absence of Her Lover Being Upon the Sea", as stated privately to a fan. She died at the age of 54 from lung cancer, on February 21, 2007, in Portland, Oregon, where she had lived and worked as a singing teacher since 2000. A memorial service for Kocjan was held in Los Angeles on March 10, 2007.

=== Tom Hoy ===
Tom Hoy was born in Glasgow in the quaintly named “Rotten Row Maternity Hospital“. He started playing gigs at the age of 15, mainly rock and soul music, with a dusting of blues. It was around this time he also began to write songs and has been doing so successfully ever since.

At the age of 19, he formed the well loved Natural Acoustic Band, taking them down to London, where 16 different record companies tried to sign them on the strength of their live work. They eventually settled with RCA, making two highly acclaimed albums with John Denver's producer, Milton Okun. They played gigs in Europe, Morocco and Tunisia, also appearing at every major U.K. venue from the Royal Albert Hall down. They often supported such acts as Don McLean, Ralph McTell and Country Joe and The Fish, appearing on the prestigious Old Grey Whistle Test on BBC TV with Alice Cooper.

Tom joined Chris Simpson and Glen Stuart in Magna Carta in the early 1970s, staying constant through changing line-ups and going on to record such albums as Took a Long Time, Prisoners on the Line and Live in Bergen. They toured extensively worldwide, appearing on television and radio throughout Europe and Scandinavia and the UK, achieving chart success in Holland with both the single and album of Took a Long Time (a song which he co-wrote with Simpson).

After leaving Magna Carta, for around 10 years Hoy toured Holland, Germany, Scandinavia, the Middle East, Central America and even The Falkland Islands with his wife Geraldine. He then worked solo for several years and went on to take an extended break to help look after his autistic son Rory.

Over the years Hoy has teamed up with Simpson from time to time to play some of the old songs together, including the 30th Anniversary show and, more recently, their appearance together at the Royal Carré Theatre, Amsterdam, where they rolled back the years for the band's 40th Anniversary celebrations. They later went on tour in South Africa and undertook some UK dates with Magna Carta.

Hoy now lives in Knaresborough, North Yorkshire. His son, Rory Hoy, is a record producer and film-maker.

== See also ==
- Scottish folk music
- Folk-rock
- Scottish music
