= Songs from Wasties Orchard =

Studio album by Magna Carta
- Released: May 6, 1971
- Recorded: Trident Studios, London
- Genres: Art rock, progressive rock
- Length: 34:52
- Label: Vertigo
- Producer: Gus Dudgeon

Magna Carta chronology
Seasons (1970)	Songs from Wasties Orchard (1971)	In Concert (1972)

Professional ratings
Review scores
Source	Rating
Allmusic	link
Prog Archives	link

Songs from Wasties Orchard is the third studio album by Magna Carta on Vertigo Records, released in 1971. It features core members Chris Simpson and Glen Stuart, as well as new guitarist Davey Johnstone. By this time Lyell Tranter had left the band and returned to his native Australia. The gatefold sleeve is designed like a box with a layer of apples.

Wasties Orchard is a small estate of flats built in the late 1960s in the village of Long Hanborough, near Oxford. The band were living here when the album was being recorded, at Trident Studios in London.

== Track listing ==
=== Side 1 ===
1. The Bridge at Knaresborough Town
2. White Snow Dove
3. Parliament Hill
4. Wayfarin'
5. Down Along Up
6. Country Jam

=== Side 2 ===
1. Time for the Leaving
2. Isle of Skye
3. Sponge
4. Sunday on the River
5. Good Morning Sun
6. Home Groan

== Personnel ==
- Davey Johnstone: Vocals, Acoustic Guitar, Electric Guitar, Mandolin, Sitar, Harpsichord, Cymbal
- Chris Simpson: Vocals, Acoustic Guitar, Percussion
- Glen Stuart: Vocals, Lyre
