= All Saints' Church, Ripley, North Yorkshire =

Church in Ripley, North Yorkshire, England

Coordinates: 54.0397°N 1.5689°W

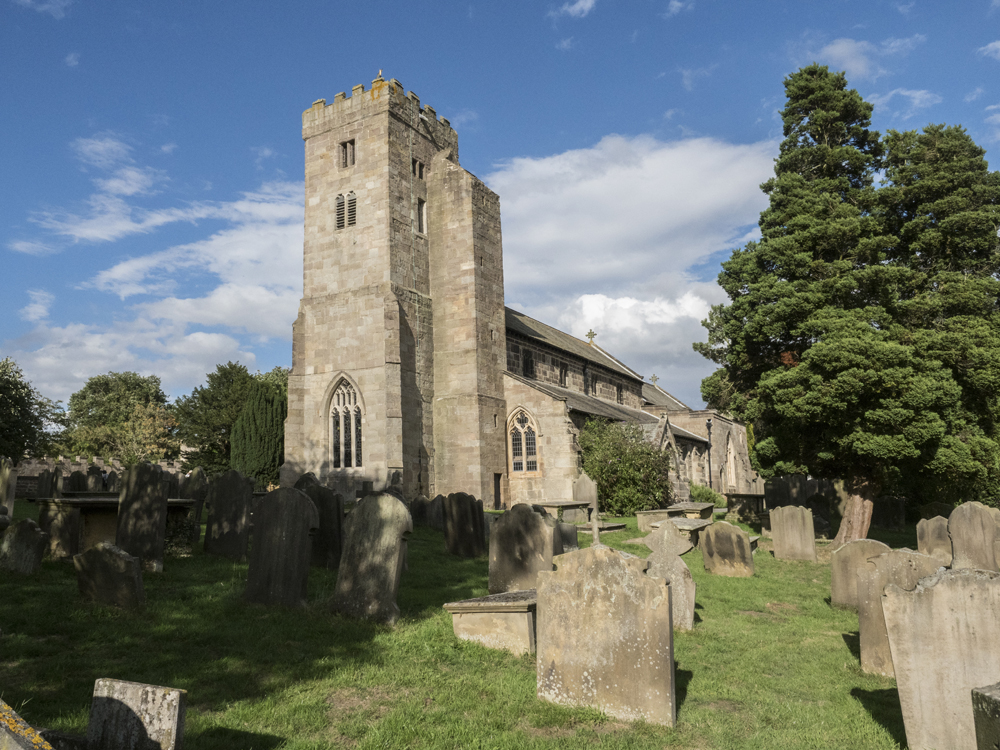
The church, in 2018

All Saints' Church is the parish church of Ripley, North Yorkshire, a village in England.

== History ==
Ripley had a chapel by the 14th century, but it suffered from subsidence. Around 1395, Thomas Ingilby demolished the chapel and built a new church, half a mile north, opposite Ripley Castle. This church was a simple building with a nave, chancel, short west tower, and a two-storey chantry. It reused some of the stones from the earlier chapel. In 1567, William Ingilby heightened the tower and added an external staircase turret, and added a clerestory to the nave. A vestry was added in about 1600, and the church was restored between 1862 and 1863, the work including the replacement of the windows and the rebuilding of the south porch. The building was grade II* listed in 1966.

== Architecture ==
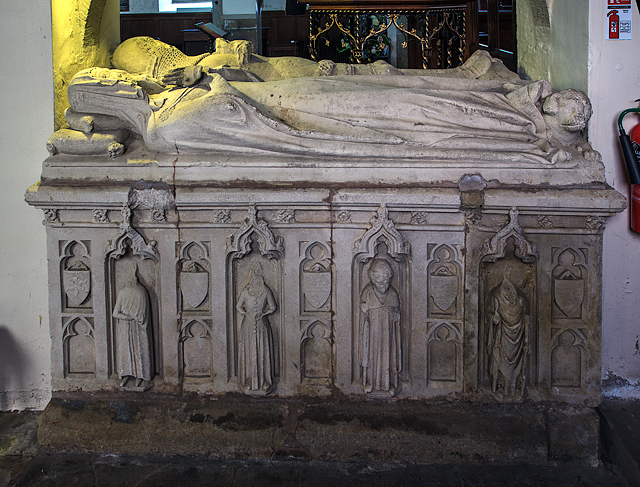
The monument to Thomas de Ingilby

The church is built in gritstone with grey slate roofs, and consists of a nave with a clerestory, north and south aisles, north and south porches, a chancel with a Patrons' Choir to the north, and a south chapel with an organ and vestry to the south, and a west tower. The tower has two stages, diagonal buttresses, and an oblong stair tower on the south. It contains a three-light west window with trefoil heads, two-light bell openings with chamfered mullions, and an embattled parapet.

Inside the church is the large chest tomb of Thomas de Ingilby and his wife, dating from about 1369 and moved from the old chapel; the tomb of William Ingilby, who died in 1617; and the Patrons' Choir with several 17th-century monuments. There is a piscina and an aumbry, remains of a 16th-century rood screen, choir stalls and a new rood screen from 1885, and a font installed as part of the 1863 restoration.

== Weeping Cross ==
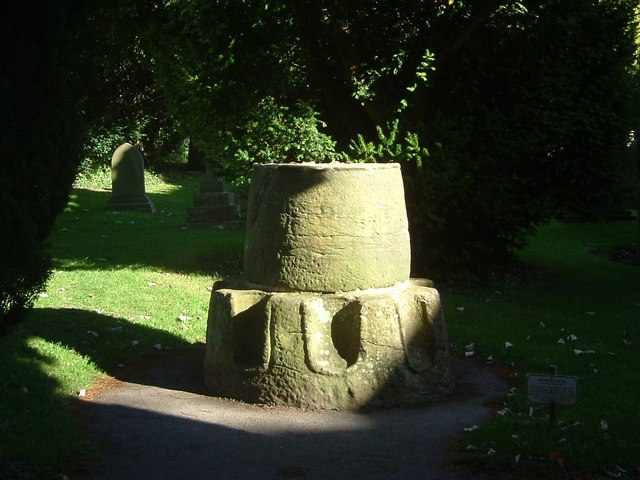
The Weeping Cross

Outside the church is the Weeping Cross, a separately grade II*-listed structure which may have been relocated from the old chapel. It is believed to have been used as a stopping point for funeral corteges, with recesses in the base probably used to place their bowed heads. This design was historically found elsewhere, but is now a unique survival. It is constructed of gritstone, is about 1.5 metres (4 ft 11 in) in height, and consists of two circular blocks of stone. In the lower block are eight recesses with segmental lower edges, and continuous moulding. The upper stone is smaller, it has slightly inward-bowed sides, and on the top is a rectangular cavity.

== See also ==
- Grade II* listed churches in North Yorkshire (district)
- Listed buildings in Ripley, North Yorkshire
