= Magna Carta (band) =

British rock band

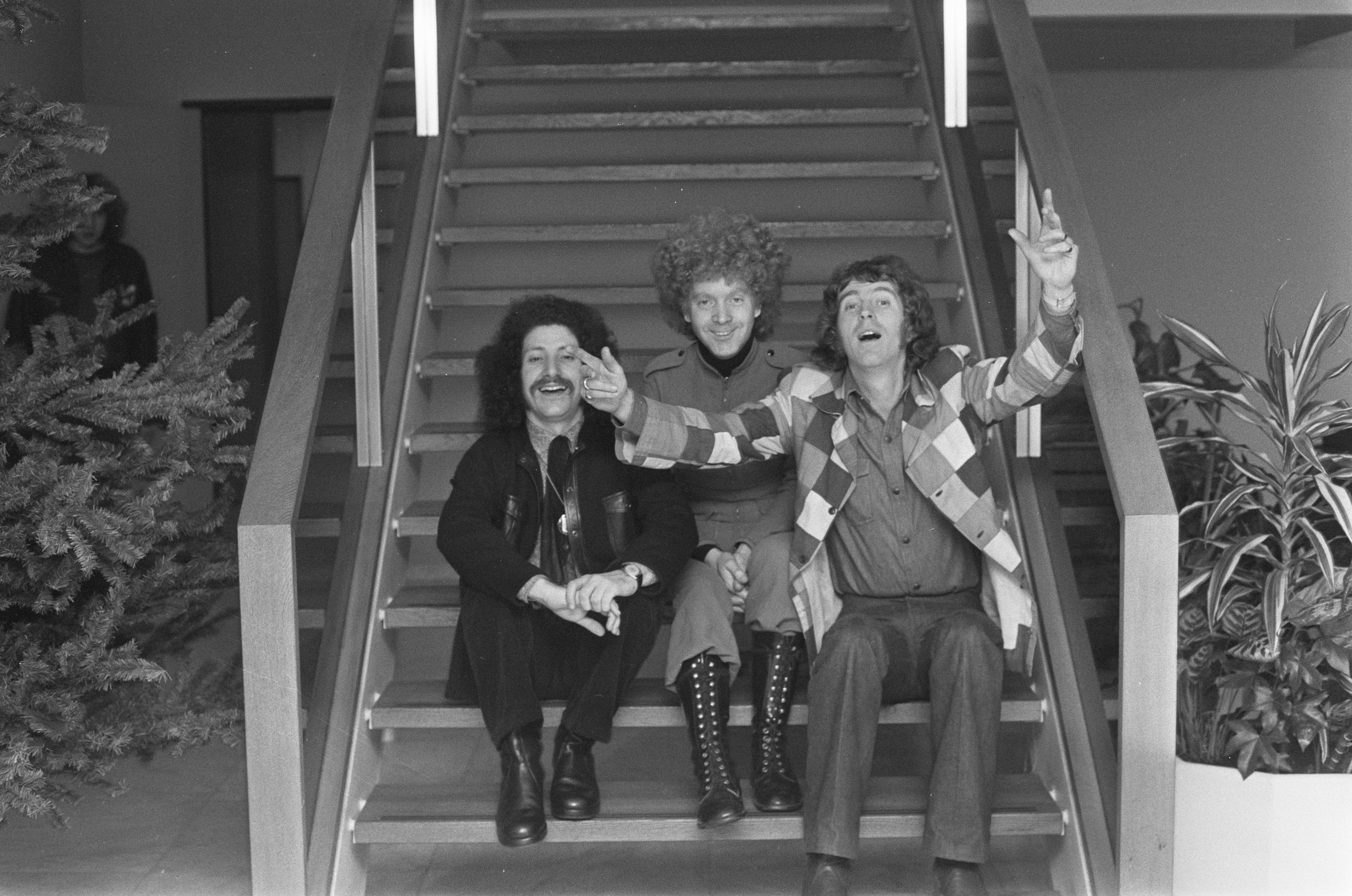
- Magna Carta, Amsterdam, 1972

Background information
- Origin: England
- Genres: folk, folk rock, acoustic, rock, Progressive rock,
- Years active: 1969–2019
- Labels: Mercury, Fontana, Vertigo, Talking Elephant, Repertoire
- Past members: Chris Simpson; George Norris; Davey Johnstone; Nigel Smith; Tom Hoy; Linda Simpson; Pick Withers; Lee Abbott
- Website: https://www.magnacarta-music.com

Magna Carta was a folk rock band originally formed in London in April 1969.

The band's debut album Magna Carta (1969) was released by Mercury Records and produced by Gus Dudgeon, producer of Elton John’s Your Song & David Bowie’s Space Oddity. The album was arranged by producer Tony Visconti. David Bowie said of the album, "That was one of the most beautiful things I’ve ever heard."

The trio signed with Mercury Records in 1969, and later with Vertigo Records, enjoying international success with Seasons, and a career spanning the 1970s & 1980s.

== History ==
Magna Carta was a folk rock band, originally formed in London in April 1969 by Chris Simpson (guitar, vocals), Lyell Tranter (guitar) and Glen Stuart (vocals). Their first concert was on 10 May 1969. Their debut album Magna Carta (1969) was released by Mercury. Their 1970 album, Seasons, reached number 55 on the UK Albums Chart, after which Tranter returned to Australia. The album was produced by Gus Dudgeon, arranged by later successful producer Tony Visconti, and the session musicians included organist Rick Wakeman, drummer Barry Morgan, jazz double bassist Spike Heatley and others. In 1971, Magna Carta performed at the Royal Albert Hall with the Royal Philharmonic Orchestra. Davey Johnstone joined the line-up, recording Songs From Wasties Orchard (1971) and In Concert (1972) with the band, before leaving to work with Elton John, with whom he is still playing.

Simpson and Stuart were then joined by Stan Gordon, recording and releasing Lord of the Ages (1973). Shortly afterwards, Graham Smith, who had played on the sessions for Songs From Wasties Orchard, replaced Gordon. This short-lived line-up, augmented by guest musicians, recorded Martin's Cafe in early 1974, but the album's release was delayed by a couple of years due to a dispute between the band's management and record company. The main duo was then joined by Tommy Hoy (ex-Natural Acoustic Band), before Stuart left to run a pet shop in Richmond, Surrey.

Nigel Smith joined in time to help record 1975's Putting It Back Together. In 1977, Hoy's former bandmate in the Natural Acoustic Band, Robin Thyne joined the band, along with Lee Abbott. Soon afterwards, Pick Withers was added. Withers stayed only briefly, leaving to join Dire Straits. Amid much acrimony, Thyne and Hoy left in 1979 to form NovaKarta. Tom McConville appeared on the Live In Bergen release, before the line-up changed again to accommodate Al Fenn and George Norris.

Between 1980 and 1982, Doug Morter was added to the line-up, together with a variety of drummers, including Paul Burgess. The 1981 release, Midnight Blue, contained "Highway To Spain". Norris, Burgess, and Morter all left, the latter moving on to the Albion Band. Chris Simpson's solo release, Listen To The Man, came out during this period and featured backing from Abbott, Linda Taylor, and Will Jackson. Between 1984 and 1986, Simpson and Taylor went to the Middle East to run a music club.

=== 1986 reformation ===
Simpson and Taylor returned home in 1986 and re-formed Magna Carta. The line-up now included, in addition to Simpson, Taylor, and Abbott; Gwyn Jones, John Carey, Paul Burgess, and Simon Carlton. In 1988, One To One was released on the Tembo label. Jones left the band the same year.

In 1990, Simpson and Taylor married, and, with the semi-retirement of Lee Abbott, they continued to play as Magna Carta as a duo, as well as with a larger line-up for extensive touring.

The 1992 Dutch release, Heartlands, was followed by a tour of the Netherlands. The duo continued to maintain a busy live schedule, and over the years toured many different countries. Several live albums appeared over the course of the decade, in addition to the reissue of the band's 1970s albums on CD.

In 2001, Seasons In The Tide was released on the Gold Circle label, although the label went bankrupt soon afterwards. In 2002, the DVD Ticket To The Moon was released, recorded at the Dutch island of Texel in 2001. Later that year, Magna Carta supported Fairport Convention on their Dutch theatre tour.

In 2007, Magna Carta had already decided that they would disband in 2009, mainly in recognition of the deterioration of the Simpsons' relationship. In late 2008 they embarked upon a "farewell tour" of the Netherlands.

In early 2011, Midnight Blue was reissued in a double album package with the live album Live & Let Live. The reissue was reviewed positively, with praise for its melodic acoustic arrangements. In September and October 2011, a new Magna Carta line up toured around 17 venues in the Netherlands.

After another tour in the Netherlands, the band returned to the studio to record a new album, The Fields of Eden (2015).

In December 2019 they announced their final concert, held at Ripley Town Hall, North Yorkshire, after 50 years in the business. This was followed by the release of their When All Is Said And Done box-set in 2023.

== Reception and legacy ==
Magna Carta's music has been described as a uniquely English fusion of folk, prog, and acoustic traditions. A 2007 retrospective in Record Collector praised their “quiet dedication” and described the band as “melodically gifted and spiritually rich,” comparing early works like Seasons to the stylings of Simon & Garfunkel.

Moof Magazine reviewed 1973’s Lord of the Ages as “a tranquil masterpiece” of progressive folk, noting its enduring appeal across generations.

== Discography ==
=== Studio albums ===
- Magna Carta (1969)
  - Also issued as This is Magna Carta and Times of Change
- Seasons (1970)
- Songs from Wasties Orchard (1971)
- Lord of the Ages (1973)
- Took A Long Time (1976)
  - Also issued as Putting it Back Together
- Martin's Café (1977)
- Prisoners on the Line (1978)
- No Truth in the Rumour (1979)
- Midnight Blue (1982)
- Sweet Deceiver (1983)
- One to One (1988)
  - Reissued with three additional tracks as Rings Around the Moon (2000)
  - Reissued as Ticket to the Moon (2005)
- Heartlands (1992)
- Seasons in the Tide (2001)
- The Fields of Eden (2015)

=== Live albums ===
- In Concert (1972)
- Live in Bergen (1978)
- Live Two by Four At The Melusina (1980)
- State of the Art (1993)
- Live at the BBC (1995)
- Live at Grassington (1999)
- Evergreen (2000)
- Forever (2000)
- A Touch of Class (2002)
- Ticket to the Moon (DVD) (2002)

=== Compilation albums ===
- Spotlight on Magna Carta (1977)
- Old Master & New Horizons (1991)
- Milestones (2CD) (1994)
- Las Tierras del Viento (1995)
- Limited Edition (1996)
- Seasons + Wasties Orchard (1999)
- Lord of the Ages + Martin's Cafe (1999)
- Where to Now? (2000)
- Magna Carta Gold (2003)
- Ages and Seasons (2003). Features 4 complete albums: "Seasons", "Songs From Wasties Orchard", "Lord Of The Ages" and "Martin's Cafe".
- In Tomorrow (2005)
- Backroads (2006)
- Airport Song (DVD) (2006)
- Deserted Highways of the Heart... (2007)
- Tomorrow Never Comes, The Anthology 1969-2006 (2CD) (2007)
- Written in the Wind (2CD) (2008)

=== Other releases ===
- Chris Simpson – Listen to the Man (1984)
