= Liberty of Ripon =

Former jurisdictional region in North Yorkshire, England

Coordinates: 54.139°N 1.524°W

The Liberty of Ripon or Riponshire was a liberty possessing separate county jurisdiction, although situated within the county of Yorkshire, England.

The liberty was under the jurisdiction of the Archbishop of York, a privilege claimed to have been granted by King Aethelstan in the 10th century. The liberty was governed by a high steward and justices of the peace, appointed by the archbishop, and the area had separate quarter sessions, in conjunction with the mayor and recorder of the borough of Ripon, in whose town hall they were held.

In 1831, the following parishes and townships (locally in the North and West Ridings of Yorkshire) were in the liberty:

- Most of Ripon
- Felixkirk
- Sutton-under-Whitestonecliffe
- Kilburn, North Yorkshire
- Nidd with Killinghall
- Marton-cum-Moxby

In 1836, the temporal jurisdiction of the archbishop was ended, with the power to appoint justices revested in the crown, and in 1837 the townships locally in the North Riding were removed from the liberty.

In 1889, the Local Government Act 1888 came into operation. Section 48 of the Act merged "every liberty and franchise of a county" into its surrounding administrative county. While this was the end of the liberty's administrative functions, separate quarter sessions continued until 1953, and it was also a distinct unit for land tax purposes for some time.
