= Listed buildings in Nidd =

Nidd is a civil parish in the county of North Yorkshire, England. It contains seven listed buildings that are recorded in the National Heritage List for England. All the listed buildings are designated at Grade II, the lowest of the three grades, which is applied to "buildings of national importance and special interest". The parish contains the village of Nidd and the surrounding countryside. The listed buildings consist of a church, parts of a cross in the churchyard, a country house, later a hotel, and associated structures, and a former railway hotel, later a private house.

== Buildings ==
Name and location	Photograph	Date	Notes
Cross base and part of shaft 54.04224°N 1.54144°W	—	Medieval (probable)	The cross base and shaft are in the churchyard of the Church of St Paul and St Margaret, to the south of the church. They are in gritstone and overall are about 1.5 metres (4 ft 11 in) tall. The base is square with a socket, and about 40 centimetres (16 in) tall. On the corners of the west face are roll mouldings, and on the east face are chamfers.
Nidd Hall; 54.04203°N 1.54041°W		1825 (probable)	A country house, later a hotel, in gritstone with hipped grey slate roofs. There are three storeys and fronts of nine and eight bays, a deep eaves cornice, and a parapet with a balustrade and piers with urns. The windows are sashes. On the west, entrance, front is a portico with Ionic columns in antis, an entablature and a cornice, and a doorway with a fanlight, above which is a window with rusticated pilaster strips and a cornice surmounted by a coat of arms. The garden front has a central two-storey bow window and two three-storey canted bay windows.
The Homestead; 54.03497°N 1.54424°W		Mid-19th century	A railway hotel, later a private house, in gritstone, with an eaves band and a hipped purple slate roof. There are two storeys and a basement on the east, and fronts of three bays. In the centre, facing the road, is a recessed porch with Tuscan columns, rusticated pilasters, an entablature and a cornice, and a doorway with a fanlight, above which is a lunette window. The other windows are sashes, and to the left is a doorway with tie-stone jambs. The east front originally faced the railway, and has a four giant Tuscan columns carrying an entablature, a cornice and a blocking course.
Church of St Paul and St Margaret; 54.04240°N 1.54150°W		1866	The church is in gritstone with a grey slate roof, and consists of a nave, a north aisle added in 1908, a south porch, a chancel and a west tower. The tower has three stages, angle buttresses, lancet windows, elaborate two-light bell openings with hood moulds, a clock face, and an embattled parapet with crocketed pinnacles. The porch is gabled and has an entrance with a pointed arch and hood mould.
South Lodge to Nidd Hall; 54.03440°N 1.54168°W	—	c. 1890 (probable)	The lodge is in gritstone with a hipped purple slate roof. There is one storey and three bays, the entrance bay canted. At the entrance is a canted portico with four Ionic columns in antis, an entablature, a cornice and a blocking course. The windows in the canted bay are casements, and to the right is a projecting bay with a sash window.
Gates, gate piers and walls, South Lodge to Nidd Hall; 54.03436°N 1.54183°W		c. 1890 (probable)	Flanking the entrance to the grounds are two pairs of gate piers in rusticated stone with a square plan about 3 metres (9.8 ft) tall, each pier with a cornice and a tall pyramidal finial. Between the inner piers are gates in cast iron with spearhead finials, and between the outer piers are railings. Outside these are curved walls about 2 metres (6 ft 7 in) high and 30 metres (98 ft) long with moulded copings, ending in similar piers.
Stables, Nidd Hall; 54.04294°N 1.54055°W	—	c. 1893	The stables are in gritstone with a hipped grey slate roof. There are two storeys, about five bays, and a projecting three-storey clock tower to the left. The main block contains a stable door with a mounting block, recessed windows under blind round arches on the ground floor and nine-pane windows above. The clock tower has a porch and a carriage arch on the ground floor, and a small rectangular window on the middle storey. Above this is a clock face below deep eaves, and a pyramidal roof with a weathervane.
