= Ripley Hampers =

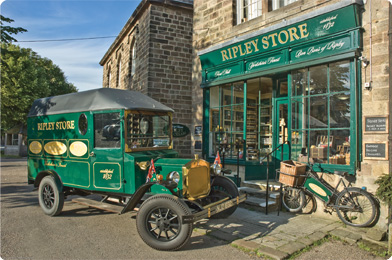
- Type: Privately held company
- Founded: Ripley, North Yorkshire, England (1834)
- Founder: Quintin Acomb
- Headquarters: Ripley, North Yorkshire, England
- Number of locations: 1 (with online additional franchise shops)
- Key people: David Thomson(Chairman)
- Revenue: ▲£1 million (2009)
- Number of employees: 20
- Website: www.ripleyhampers.co.uk

Ripley Hampers founder Quintin Acomb first set up the British hamper company in 1834. The Ripley brand also applies to other enterprises undertaken by the Ripley Group of companies, including Ripley Fine Foods Limited, Ripley Traditional Sweet Company, Ripley Ice Cream and Ripley Store.

Several of Ripley Group's companies are tourist attractions including the seasonal Christmas department and the Fine Food store, Ripley Ice Cream and these attract coach parties to the Ripley area.

Ripley Hampers is part of the Ripley Fine Foods Brand.

== History ==
Quintin Acomb who died 18 November 1862 set up Ripley Hampers.

The young Quintin Acomb chose Ripley in North Yorkshire, as the location to establish his business. Quintin worked closely with Sir William Amcotts Ingilby Ingilby of Ripley Castle and the new store opened in 1832.

Acomb's Ripley venture was a success, patronised by the castle, local gentry and wider community.

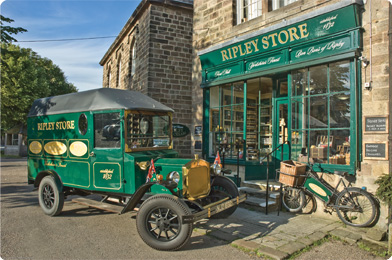

The tradition of giving food hampers at Christmas began in Victorian times. Food and drink would be brought together and placed in wicker baskets by wealthy families and then given to their staff as a gift for them and their families to enjoy over Christmas.

Historically the amount of food in a hamper would be limited to that which one person could carry but as the fast expanding railways opened up the country people found it easier to send hampers to friends and relatives based in the large industrial cities.

It wasn't long until Acomb caught on to the idea of packaging his Ripley Fine foods and drink in wicker hampers. He had been inspired after he had travelled to a London department store which had already begun to distribute hampers using the railway network.

Ripley Hampers contains luxury items such as Stilton cheese, champagne, smoked salmon remain popular today, especially at Christmas time.

== Ripley Group ==
Ripley Hampers is a trading arm of the Ripley Fine Foods which also encompasses Ripley Store, Ripley Traditional Sweet Co, Ripley Flowers, Ripley Fine Gifts, Ripley Chocolates, Ripley Gift Experiences and Ripley Ice Cream.
