= Henry Butler, 14th Viscount Mountgarret =

British aristocrat

Henry Edmund Butler, 14th Viscount Mountgarret (18 December 1844 – 2 October 1912), was a British aristocrat.

== Family ==
Henry Butler was the son of Henry Edmund Butler, 13th Viscount Mountgarret and inherited the viscountcy on his death in 1900. He inherited Nidd Hall from his great-aunt Elizabeth Rawson in 1890.

== Career ==
He served as High Sheriff of Yorkshire in 1895. In 1911 he was created Baron Mountgarret, of Nidd Hall in the West Riding of the County of York, in the Peerage of the United Kingdom, thus enabling him and his descendants to sit in the House of Lords until the passage of the House of Lords Act 1999.

== Marriages and children ==
Lord Mountgarret married twice. His first marriage was in 1868 to Mary Charlton, who died in 1900. They had four children:

- Hon. Elinor Frances Butler (1869–1943)
- Hon. Ethel Mary Butler (1871–1926)
- Edmund Butler, 15th Viscount Mountgarret (1875–1918)
- Kathleen Grace Butler (born and died 1875)

Mountgarret married secondly, at All Saints´Church, Margaret Street, London, on 5 February 1902, Robinia Hanning-Lee, daughter of Colonel Hanning-Lee, commander of the 2nd Life Guards. They had one child:

- Piers Butler, 16th Viscount Mountgarret (1903–1966)

Peerage of Ireland
| Preceded by Henry Edmund Butler | Viscount Mountgarret; 1900–1912 | Succeeded by Edmund Somerset Butler |
Peerage of the United Kingdom
| New creation | Baron Mountgarret; 1911–1912 | Succeeded by Edmund Somerset Butler |
