= Nidd Hall =

Country house hotel in Yorkshire, England

Coordinates: 54.0421°N 1.5403°W

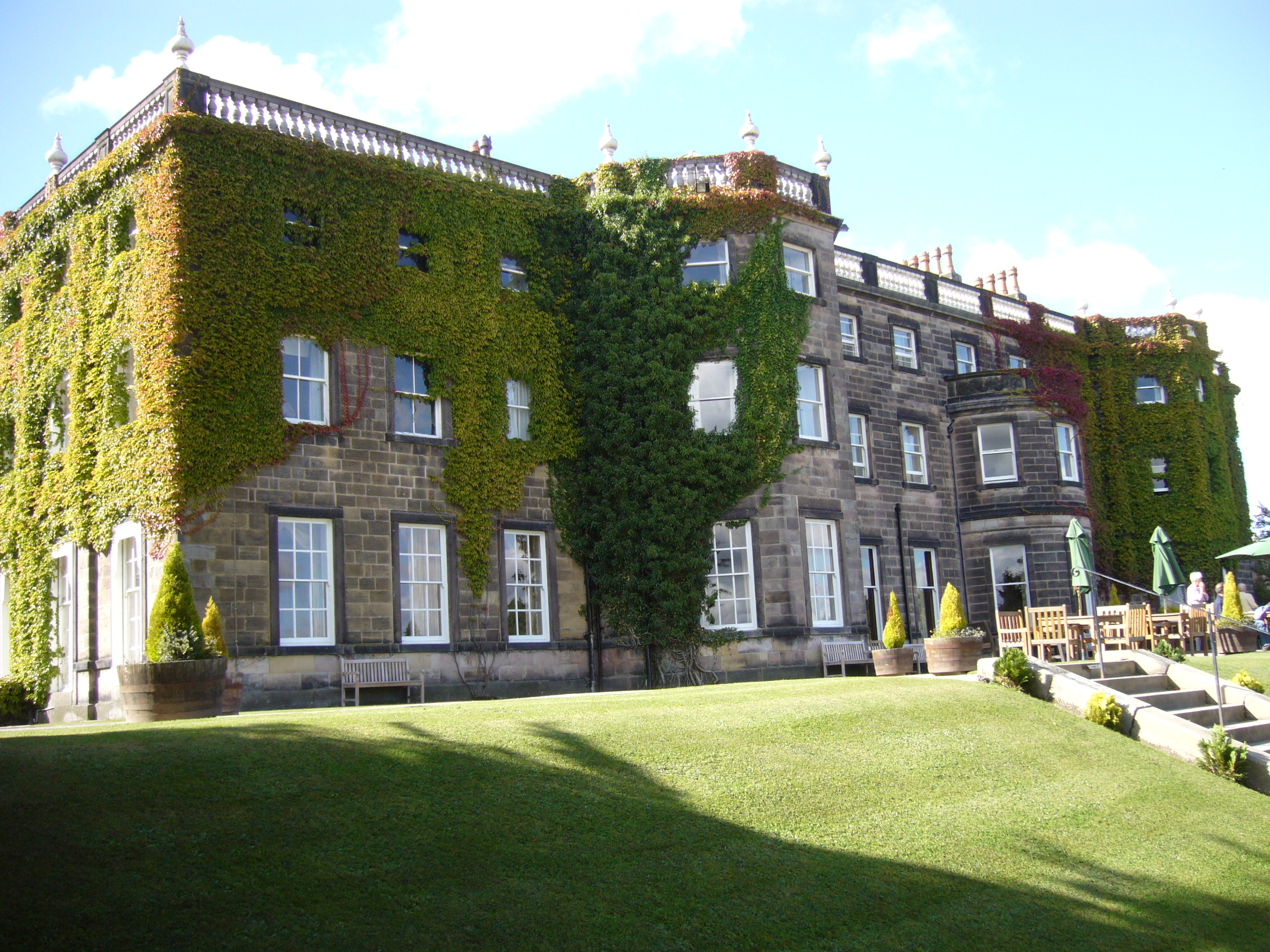
Nidd Hall

Nidd Hall was a 19th-century country house, now a hotel, in the village of Nidd, North Yorkshire, England. It is a Grade II listed building.

It is constructed of coursed squared gritstone and ashlar with grey slate roofs. It is built in 3 storeys in a 9 x 8 bay rectangular block.

== History ==
Nidd Hall, an Elizabethan Manor house, was the seat of the Trappes family. The Catholic priest, Peter Snow, would appear to have resided with Ralph Grimston at Nidd, and in 1598 was arrested in his company. They were both martyred at York on 15 June of that year. On 23 February 1606, the manor and lordship of Nidd was transferred by Lord William Howard and others, apparently acting as trustees, to Sir William Mallory and Sir William Ingleby, probably trustees to the Byrnand estate for Sir Francis Trappes-Byrnand, whose father, Francis Trappes, of London, had married Anne, daughter and heir of Robert Byrnand, Esq., of Knaresborough, whose wife, Anne, was a granddaughter of Richard Neville, Lord Latimer. Sir Francis Trappes, who was knighted at Windsor in 1603, assumed the additional surname of Byrnand, and was the first of his family to reside at Nidd Hall.

The hall was rebuilt in 1825 for Benjamin Rawson, a businessman with major commercial interests in Bradford, who had bought the 4000-acre estate from Francis Michael Trappes the previous year. It passed on his death in 1844 to his daughter Elizabeth, who died at the hall in 1890. It then passed to her great-nephew Hon. Henry Edmund Butler, of Eagle Hall, Pateley Bridge, the son of Viscount Mountgarret, who assumed in 1891 the surname of Rawson-Butler by Royal licence. In 1902 he reverted to the name of Butler.

Henry was appointed High Sheriff of Yorkshire for 1895 and became the 14th Viscount Mountgarret in 1900. In 1890–93 he greatly enlarged and remodelled the hall in the classical style. The estate then descended to Richard Butler, 17th Viscount Mountgarret, who sold it in the 1960s to racehorse owner Guy Reed, who operated the Nidd Hall Stud on the site. He later sold the estate to the racehorse owner and trainer Hon. Ian Matthews, who ran it as the Nidd Park Stud.

By 1987 the size of the estate had reduced to 250 acres. In that year a unique style 6 Welte Orchestrion was removed from one of the rooms and sold at auction to an American collector.

The hall is now a Warner Leisure Hotels 4-star hotel.

== See also ==
- Listed buildings in Nidd
