= Ripley, North Yorkshire =

Village and civil parish in North Yorkshire, England

Coordinates: 54°02′25″N 1°34′02″W

Ripley
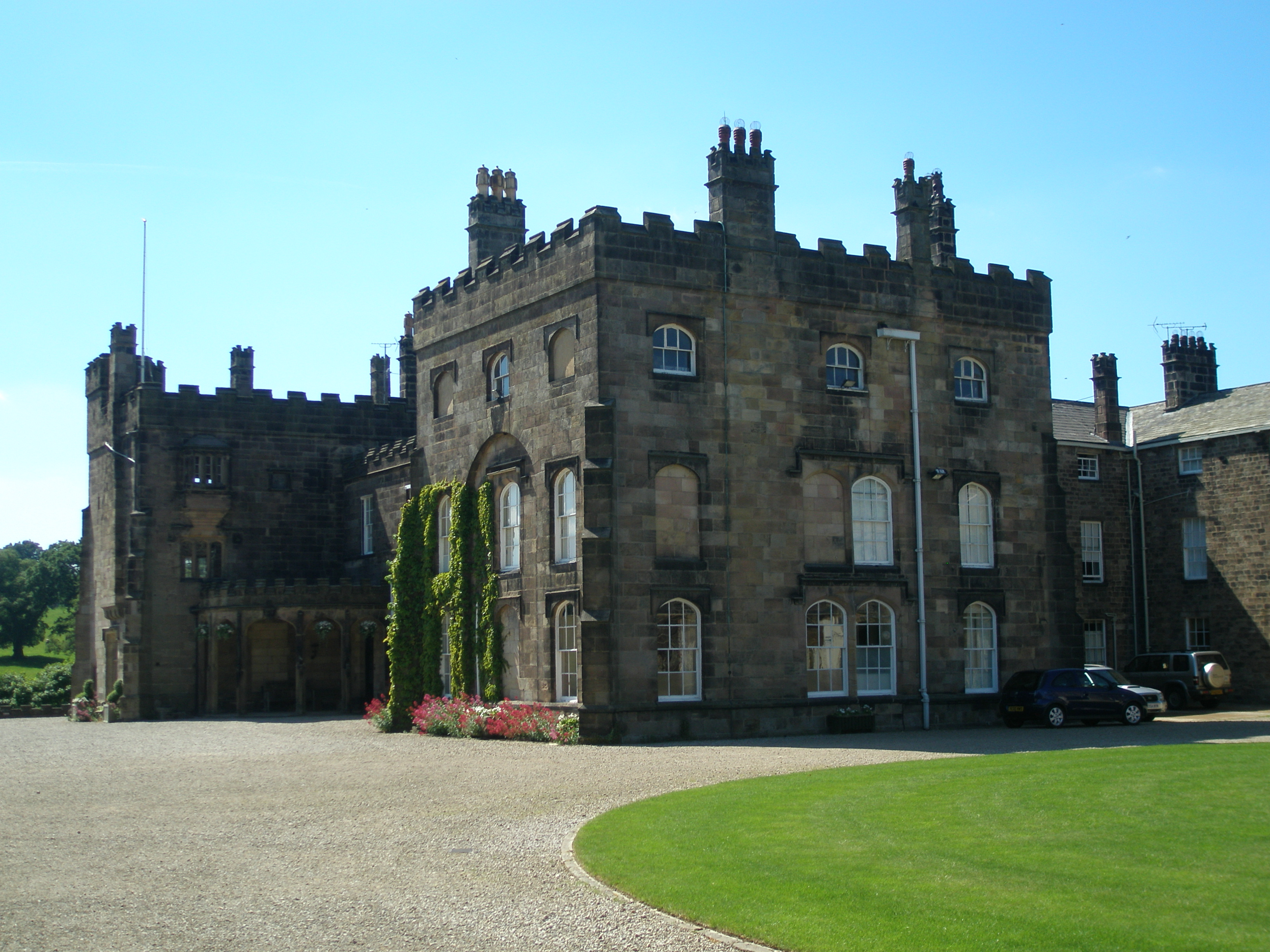
- Ripley Castle

- Location within North Yorkshire
- Population: 232 (2011 census)
- OS grid reference: SE282605
- Unitary authority: North Yorkshire
- Ceremonial county: North Yorkshire
- Region: Yorkshire and the Humber
- Country: England
- Sovereign state: United Kingdom
- Post town: HARROGATE
- Postcode district: HG3
- Dialling code: 01423
- Police: North Yorkshire
- Fire: North Yorkshire
- Ambulance: Yorkshire

Ripley is a village and civil parish in North Yorkshire in England, a few miles north of Harrogate on the A61 road towards Ripon. The village name derives from Old English and is believed to mean wood of the Hrype or Ripon people.

Until 1974 it was part of the West Riding of Yorkshire. From 1974 to 2023 it was part of the Borough of Harrogate; it is now administered by the unitary North Yorkshire Council.

== History ==
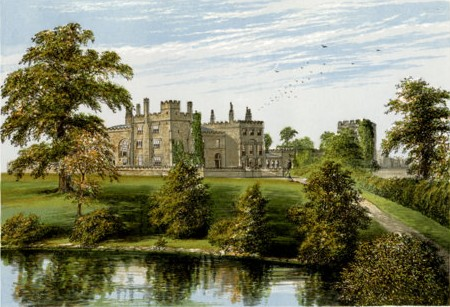
Ripley Castle, 1816 by Francis Orpen Morris

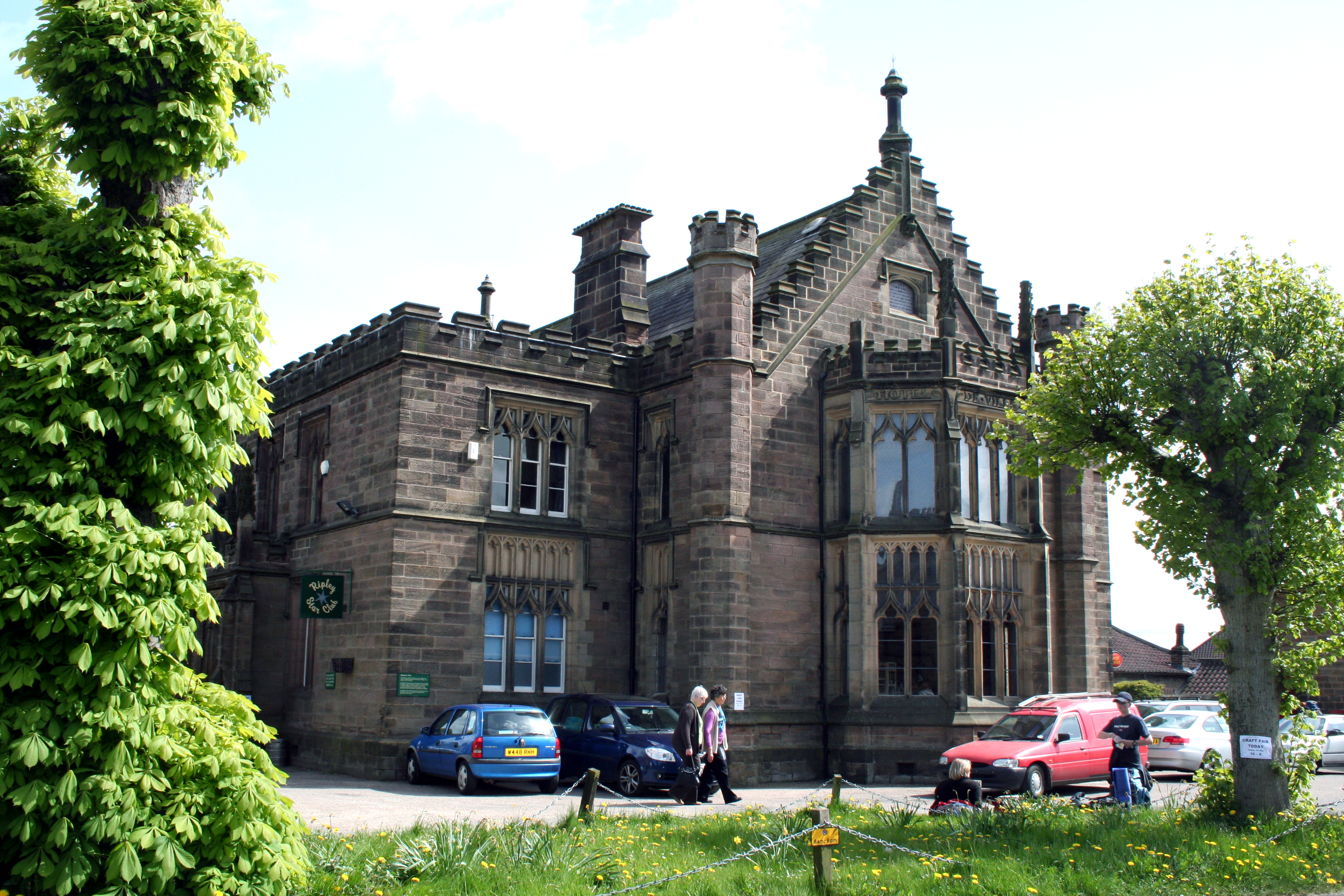
Ripley Town Hall

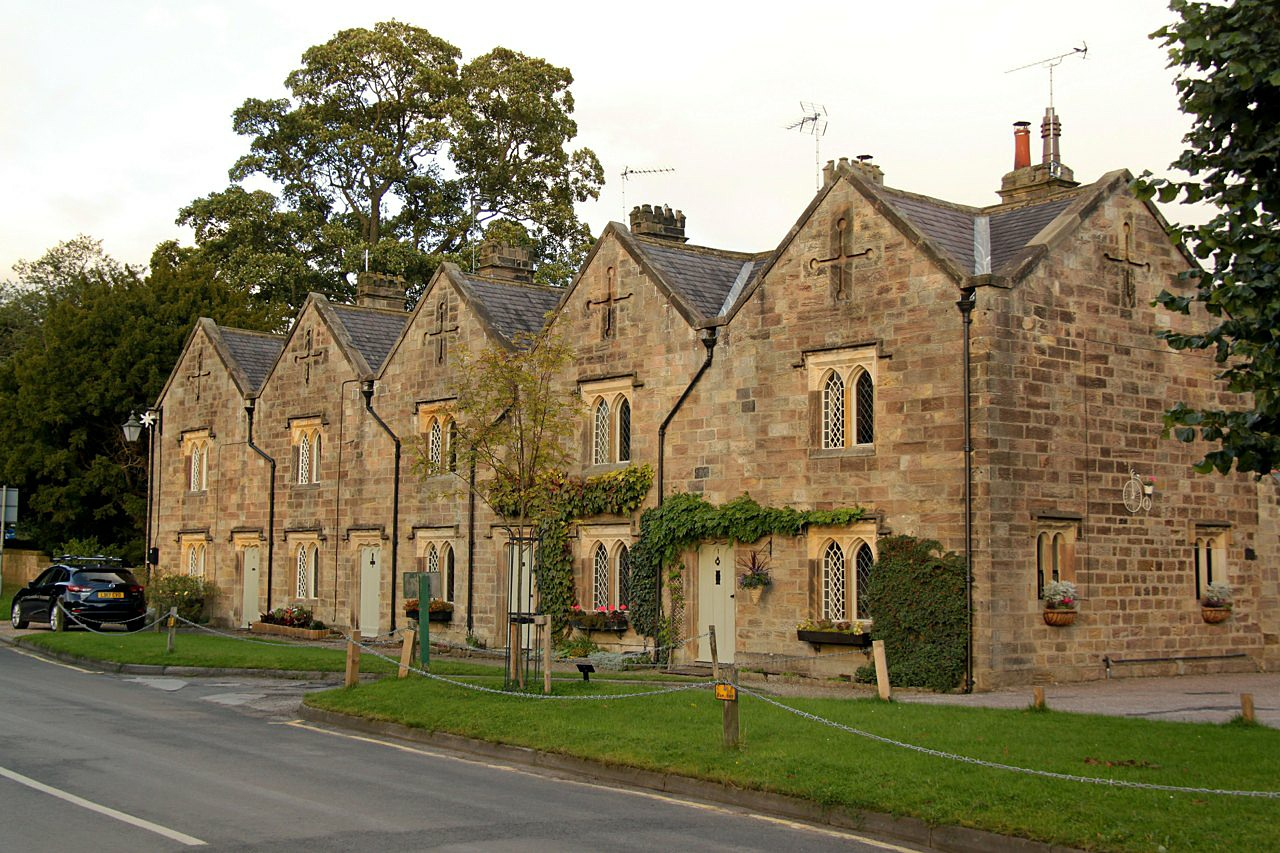
Town Hall Cottages, Ripley

The village and castle are privately owned. A castle dating from the 15th century, Ripley Castle, has been the home of the Ingilby family for 700 years. The present owner is Sir Thomas Ingilby, 6th Baronet (see Ingilby Baronets), the 28th generation. The castle, which has a priest hole, is open for public tours. The landscaped castle grounds and ornamental lakes are also open to the public.

Ripley has 55 Grade II Listed buildings and two that are Grade I Listed: Ripley Castle and the "Gatehouse Approximately 80 Metres South of Ripley Castle".

A 19th century owner, William Amcotts-Ingilby tore down the old village, except for the castle and All Saints' Church, Ripley, and modelled it after an Alsatian village with Ripley Town Hall (reopened 1854) designed in the style of a French "hôtel de ville".

In March 2017, the village was named number 17 out of the 20 Best Villages in Britain to live in (one of only two in the North of England).

== Transport ==
There have been two railway stations serving Ripley, now both long closed. From 1848 to 1962 the village was served by Ripley station, renamed Nidd Bridge station in 1862, on the Leeds-Northallerton railway, 1 mile east of the village. From 1862 to 1951 the village was served by Ripley station, renamed Ripley Valley station in 1875, on the Nidd Valley Railway, 0.5 mile south of the village.

The village is now served by Harrogate bus route 36, linking Ripley to Ripon, Harrogate and Leeds.

There is a cycle and foot path between Ripley and Harrogate called the Nidderdale Greenway, which uses part of the old route of the Nidd Valley Railway. It is part of the National Cycle Route 67.

== See also ==
- Listed buildings in Ripley, North Yorkshire
- Ripley Group—Ripley Fine Foods Limited, Ripley Traditional Sweet Company, The World Famous Ripley Ice Cream and Ripley Store
