= Woodland House =

House in Holland Park, London

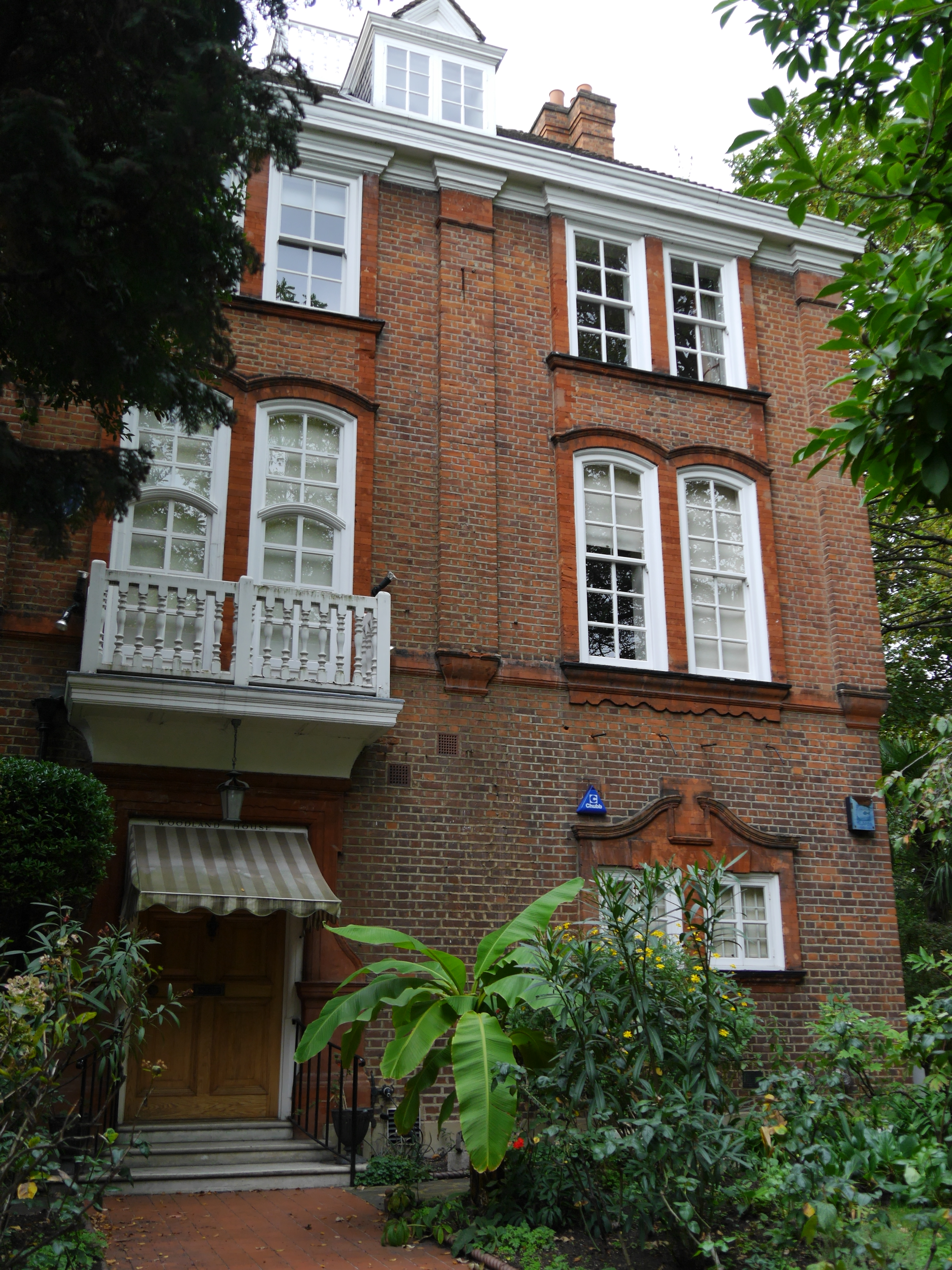
- Woodland House

- Location within Greater London
- 51°29′59.51″N 0°12′10.02″W
- Location: Holland Park, W14, London, England

History
- Built: 1876–77

Site notes
- Architect: Richard Norman Shaw
- Architectural style: Queen Anne style
- Governing body: As of 2013, leasehold privately owned, freehold owned by the Ilchester Estate

Listed Building – Grade II*
- Official name: Woodland House
- Designated: 29 July 1949
- Reference no.: 1188804

Woodland House is a large detached house at 31 Melbury Road in the Holland Park district of Kensington and Chelsea, West London, England. Built from 1875 to 1877 in the Queen Anne style by the architect Richard Norman Shaw, it is a Grade II* listed building. Commissioned by the painter Luke Fildes, Woodland House is next to William Burges's Grade I listed Tower House.

Originally 11 Melbury Road, the house was renumbered as 31 Melbury Road in 1967. It was the second of two houses in Melbury Road designed by Shaw, the first, 8 Melbury Road, was designed for another painter Marcus Stone. Fildes and Stone were artistic rivals and each naturally regarded their own Shaw-designed house as superior. Of the construction of Woodland House Fildes wrote in November 1876 that "The house is getting on famously and looks stunning ... It is a long way the most superior house of the whole lot; I consider it knocks Stone's to fits, though of course he wouldn't have that by what I hear he says of his, but my opinion is the universal one." Fildes moved into the house in October 1877 and it remained his home until his death there in February 1927. In 1959, the London County Council commemorated Fildes at Woodland House with a blue plaque.

Woodland House was later the home of the film director Michael Winner. His father purchased the lease for the property after the Second World War and, buying the outstanding lease from his father in 1972, Winner lived at the house until his own death at the house in 2013. It was subsequently purchased by the singer Robbie Williams.

== Location ==
The development of Melbury Road in the grounds of Little Holland House created an art colony in Holland Park, the inhabitants of which became known as the Holland Park Circle.

Shaw congratulated Fildes on acquiring "such a delicious site" in May 1875. The site was recommended to Fildes by Val Prinsep, it is at the bend of Melbury Road, with vistas to the south and west, adjoining Holland Lane (now Ilchester Place) on the east. The garden spans 0.75 acres (0.30 ha) and contains tropical and native trees. The gardens of Woodland House and the adjoining Tower House both contain trees from the former Little Holland House.

== Design ==
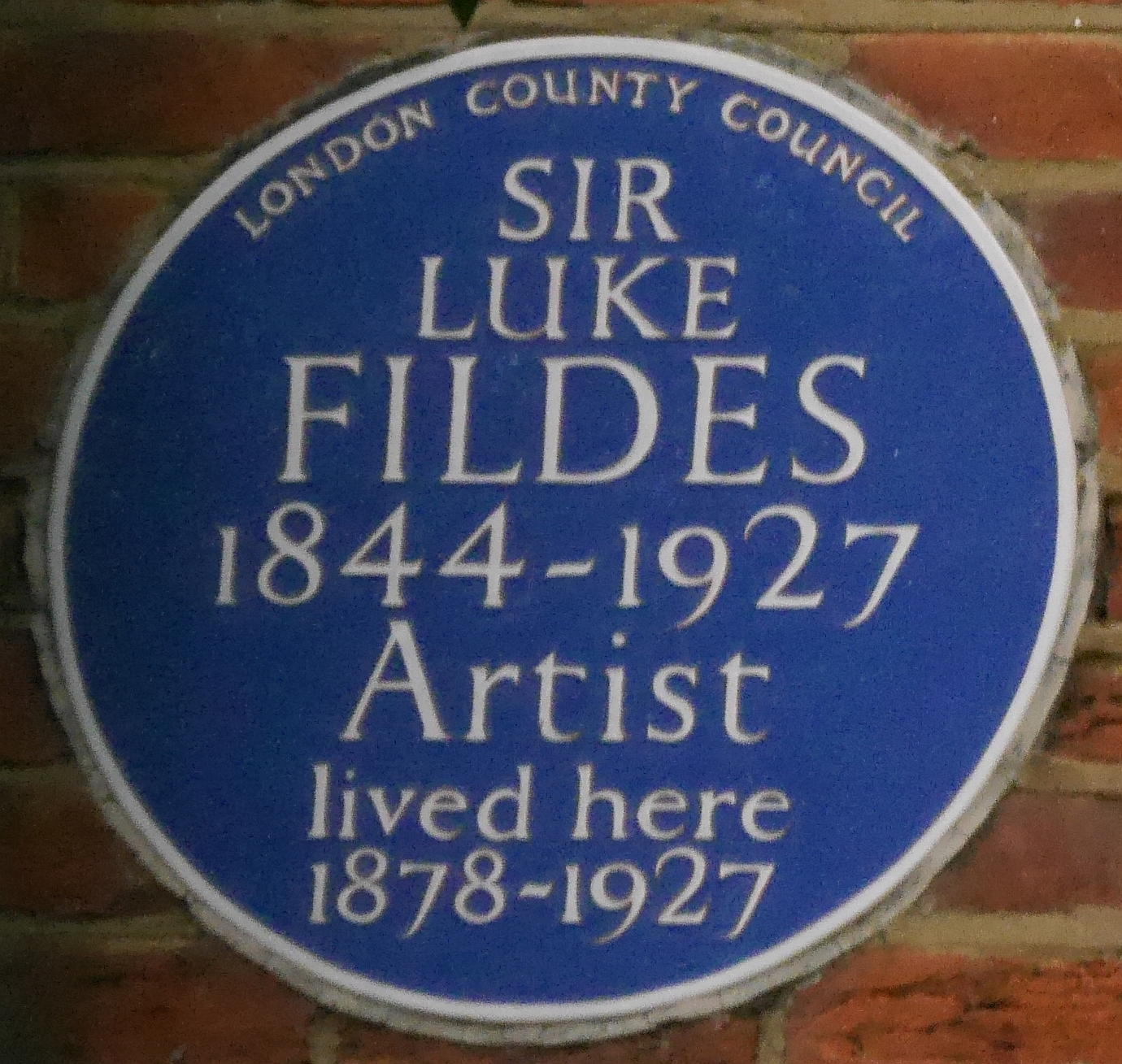
Woodland House blue plaque commemorating Luke Fildes at the site

Woodland House was designed by architect Richard Norman Shaw. Shaw was well acquainted with members of the art establishment, being friends with Dante Gabriel Rossetti, William Morris and Philip Webb. The choice by Fildes and Stone of Richard Norman Shaw as the architect of their houses was an important symbol of their ambition to become academicians, members of the Royal Academy of Arts, and of the art establishment themselves. The imposing houses and studios that Shaw designed would impress potential patrons. All of the "studio-houses" of the Holland Park Circle were built with red bricks, a colour that stood in contrast to the white stucco that had been traditionally used in the surrounding area.

Shaw had prepared preliminary designs of Woodland House by August 1875, and building began early in 1876, with construction being undertaken by W. H. Lascelles. The initial cost of building the house was £4,500. Fildes and his family moved into the house in the Autumn of 1877. Fildes house was larger than Marcus Stone's, and costlier to build. Shortly after Fildes had commissioned Shaw to design his house, Fildes' grandmother, Mary, had died, leaving him her property.

Facing south, Fildes' large artists studio was at the rear of the house and was lit by a skylight and six tall windows grouped in pairs of two. This arrangement was found not to provide the necessary light and the middle pair of windows was redesigned as a single, large, four-light, window. The studio was initially 43 feet (13 m) and 24 feet (7.3 m). A winter studio was added in 1880, followed by a glass studio in 1885, situated above a nursery. When King Edward VII came to sit for a state portrait he described the studio as "one of the finest rooms in London".

In 1893 The Strand Magazine described Fildes' house as "that of the artist – everything has its own artistic place and corner; nothing fails to harmonise, nothing comes short of gaining the effect wanted". The interior was noted by the Strand Magazine to contain predominantly Sheraton style furniture with "Venetian and Flemish black-framed mirrors, Hispano-Moresque pottery, Venetian brass and copper-ware ... blue-and-white Nankin and Delft (porcelain)".

Fildes' children's bedrooms were hung with wallpapers designed by Morris & Co. and Walter Crane. Under Fildes' the hallway was encrusted with crimson and gold, and after passing through crimson curtains a visitor ascended stairs lined with brass plates, paintings from the Italian Renaissance and tapestries.

Michael Winner's father bought the house on a long lease after the Second World War. He divided the property into three flats, erecting walls and installing false ceilings in the process. Winner restored the original layout of the house even sourcing contemporary bricks from demolished buildings. A folly was also reinstated on the roof as well as the original wrought iron gates.

Under Winner the house had 47 rooms and some 2,000 lightbulbs. Amenities included a Jacuzzi, swimming pool, steam room, and cinema. Winner hired the services of interior designer Tessa Kennedy to help him renovate the house, originally wishing Woodland House to look like the "home of a country vicar", but by the finish of the work Winner described it as "completely over the top" and said it resembled the "house of a lottery winner".

== Michael Winner ==
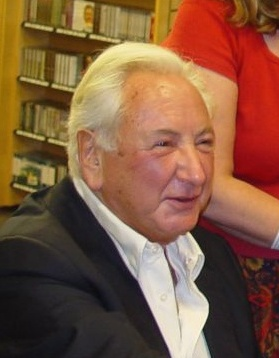
Michael Winner, who owned Woodland House from 1972 to 2013

After Fildes death, the house was occupied in turn by the retired soldier Brigadier General Charles Forbes Blane, the manufacturer Edward Barford and the merchant banker, Walther Augustus Brandt. Film director Michael Winner's parents acquired Woodland House after the Second World War, when his father paid £2,000 for a 17-year lease on the house. When his parents emigrated to France in 1972 Winner purchased Woodland House from them to avoid a punitive gift tax. At the time of Winner's purchase of the house from his parents, Woodland House was divided into three flats, two of them subject to rent-control, with 17 years remaining on the leasehold. Winner subsequently negotiated a new leasehold in 1972 for £150,000, extending the lease to the 2040s.

Winner was an art collector, and a connoisseur of British illustration. His art collection included works by Jan Micker, William James, Edmund Dulac, E. H. Shepard, Arthur Rackham, Kay Nielsen and Beatrix Potter. It also included almost 200 signed colour-washed illustrations by Donald McGill. In 2008 he announced his intention to bequeath the house as a museum, but discussions with Kensington and Chelsea council stalled after they were unable to meet the £15 million cost of purchasing the freehold of the property, which expires in 2046. The freehold is owned by the Ilchester Estate.

Informal discussions had taken place with the curator of the Leighton House Museum, situated in the adjacent street and also owned by the council. Winner had wished to greet future visitors to Woodland House as a talking waxwork statue, uttering a variation on his catch phrase, "Calm down, dear, I'm only a dummy".

Woodland House was informally for sale for four months before Winner publicly announced it was for sale for £60 million in August 2011. The value of Woodland House had previously been estimated by Winner as £35 million in 2006 and later at £100 million in 2008. Winner died at Woodland House in January 2013. He was survived by his wife, Geraldine.

== Robbie Williams ==
Woodland House is currently owned by the singer Robbie Williams. Since purchasing the house for £17.5 million, Williams has undertaken significant renovations, some of which have led to planning conflicts with his neighbour at The Tower House, the Led Zeppelin guitarist, Jimmy Page.

== Bibliography ==
- Cherry, Bridget; Pevsner, Nikolaus (2002). London 3 North West. The Buildings of England. Yale University Press. ISBN 978-0-300-09652-1.
- Dakers, Caroline. (1999) The Holland Park Circle: Artists and Victorian Society Yale University Press ISBN 978-0-300-08164-0
