= Holland Park Circle =

Victorian artists group in London

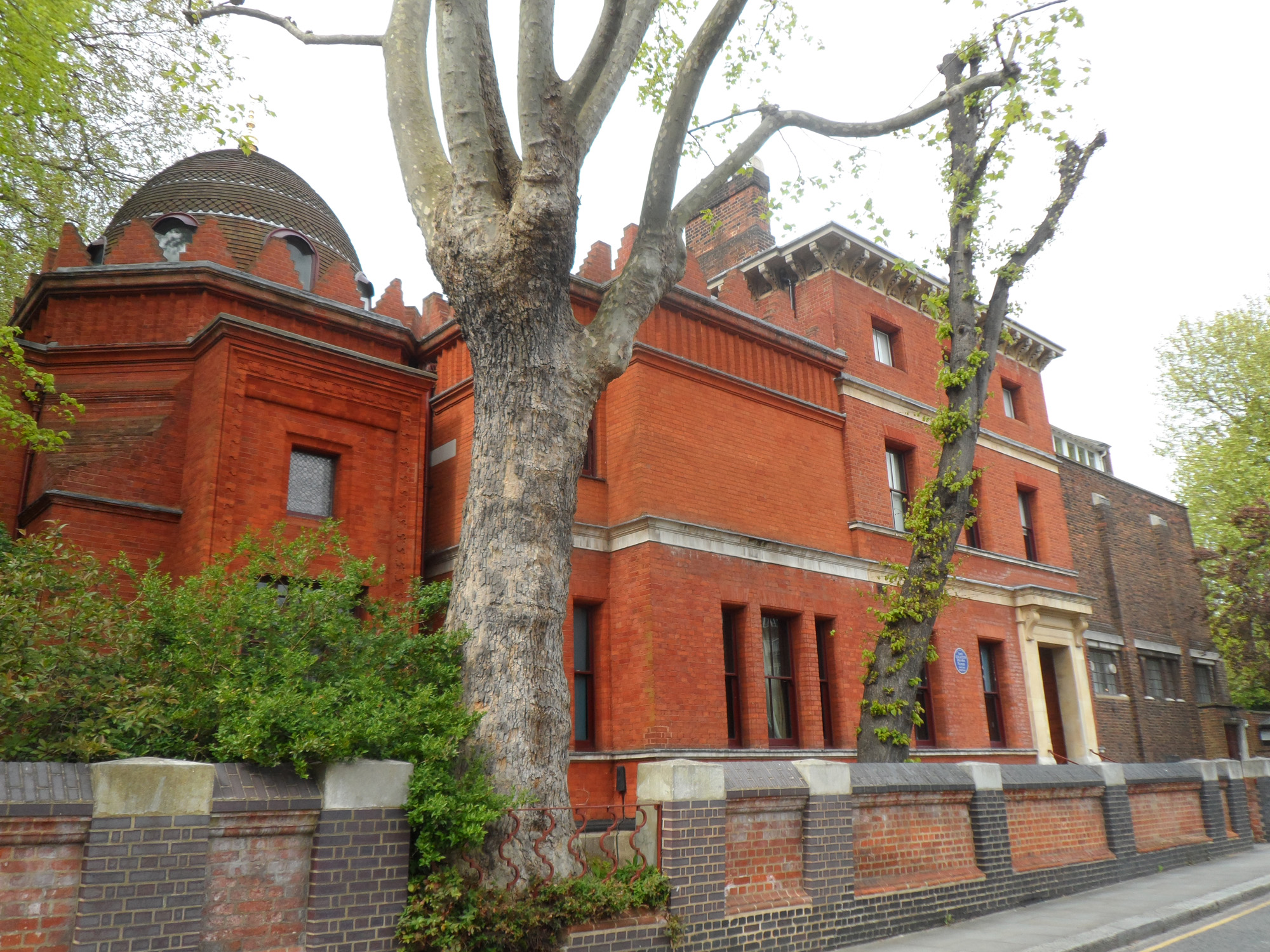
- Leighton House, 12 Holland Park Road, home of Lord Leighton PRA, member of the Holland Park Circle
- Named after: Holland Park
- Formation: Late 19th century
- Founded at: Holland Park, London
- Type: Art group
- Legal status: Disbanded
- Purpose: Art
- Location: London, United Kingdom
- Origins: Little Holland House
- Region served: Holland Park, London
- Products: Artworks
- Field: Visual art
- Key people: George Frederic Watts, Frederic Leighton, Valentine Prinsep, Luke Fildes, Hamo Thornycroft, William Burges

The Holland Park Circle was an informal group of 19th-century artists based in the Holland Park district of West London, England, especially in Melbury Road and Holland Park Road. George Frederic Watts, Frederic Leighton, Valentine Prinsep, Luke Fildes, Hamo Thornycroft and William Burges are considered key members of the group.

== List of artists' houses of the Holland Park Circle ==
The following are houses of special interest:

- 2, 2a, and 2b Melbury Road, designed by John Belcher for Thomas and Mary Thornycroft and their family, built 1876–7
- 6 Melbury Road, designed by Frederick Pepys Cockerell for George Frederic Watts, built 1875–6; gallery extension by George Aitchison, 1878; demolished 1964 and replaced by a block of flats, Kingfisher House
- 8 Melbury Road, designed by Richard Norman Shaw for Marcus Stone, built 1875–7
- The Tower House, 9 Melbury Road (now 29), designed by William Burges for himself, built 1876–8
- 14 Melbury Road for Colin Hunter by J. J. Stevenson, built 1876; destroyed by bombing during the Second World War
- Woodland House, 11 Melbury Road (now 31), designed by Richard Norman Shaw for Luke Fildes, built 1876–7
- 1 Holland Park Road (now 14), designed by Philip Webb for Val Prinsep, built 1864–6
- 2 Holland Park Road (now 12, the Leighton House Museum), designed by George Aitchison for Frederic, Lord Leighton, built 1866, extensions added until 1895
- South House and 3 Holland Park Road (now 10), designed by W. E. and F. Brown for J. J. Shannon, built 1892
- 49 Napier Road, designed by John William Simpson for Herbert Schmalz (Herbert Carmichael), redeveloped and studio added 1893

== See also ==
- Pre-Raphaelite Brotherhood
