= 18 Melbury Road =

Historic house in Holland Park, London, England

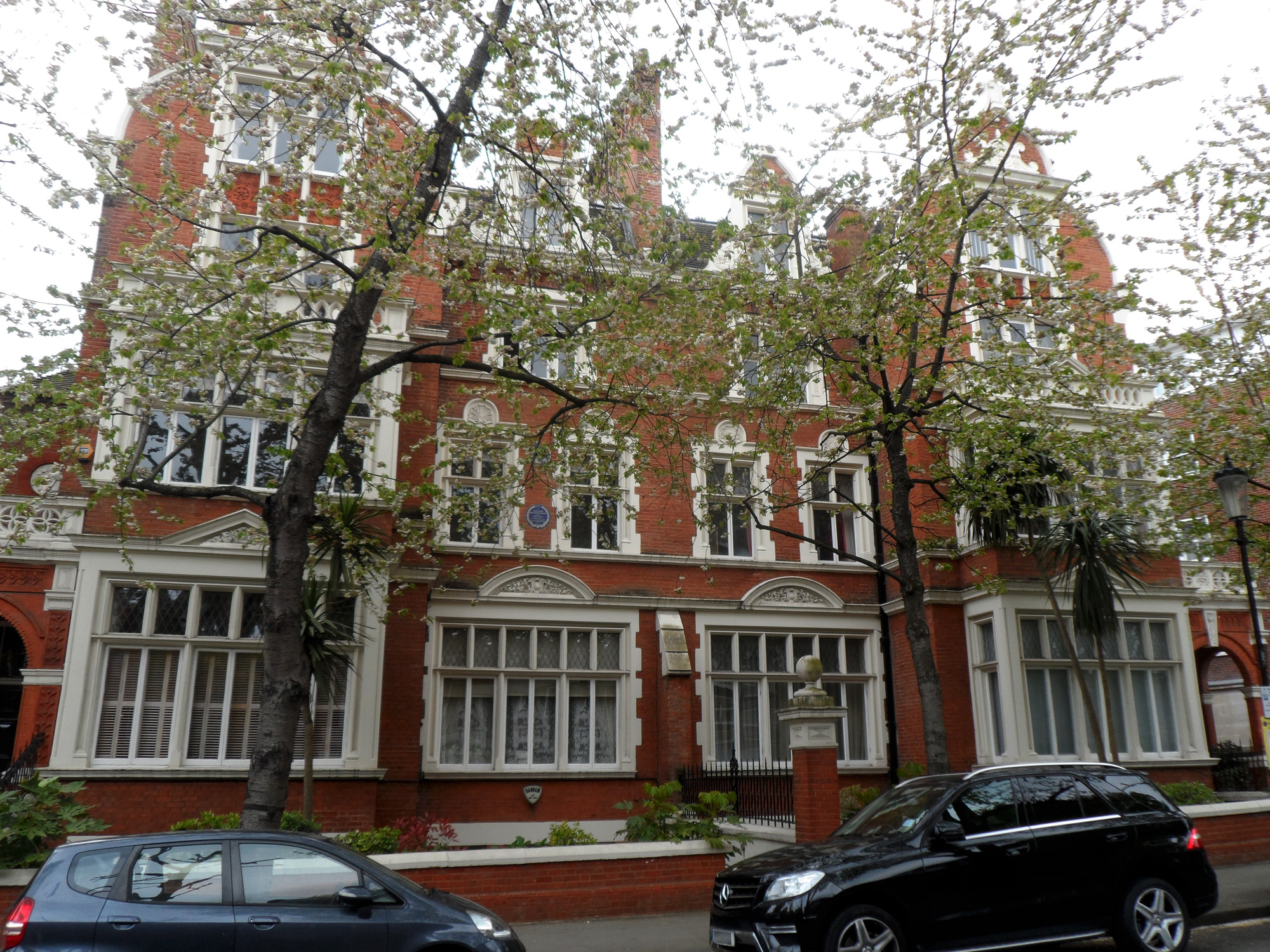
- Front view of the building (No 18 left and No 16 right) from Melbury Road

- Location within Greater London
- 51.49925°N 0.20223°W
- Location: Melbury Road, Holland Park, London W14 8LT, England

History
- Built: 1877 (18A studio completed by 1893)

Site notes
- Architect: William Turner of Chelsea
- Architectural style: Flemish bond brick
- Governing body: Privately owned

Listed Building – Grade II
- Official name: 16, 18 and 18A Melbury Road W14
- Designated: 7 November 1984
- Reference no.: 1225643

18 Melbury Road is a large semi-detached house in the Holland Park district of Kensington and Chelsea, London W14, England, located just north of Kensington High Street. The house was built in Victorian times as a brick and stucco house with gas lighting by William Turner of Chelsea, London and originally sold on a 90-year lease.

The 1877 building is semi-detached with No 16. Both houses have three storeys with attic dormers and a tiled roof, built in brick with Flemish bond and painted cement. Attached to the rear outer corner of No 18 is a single-storey brick studio building.

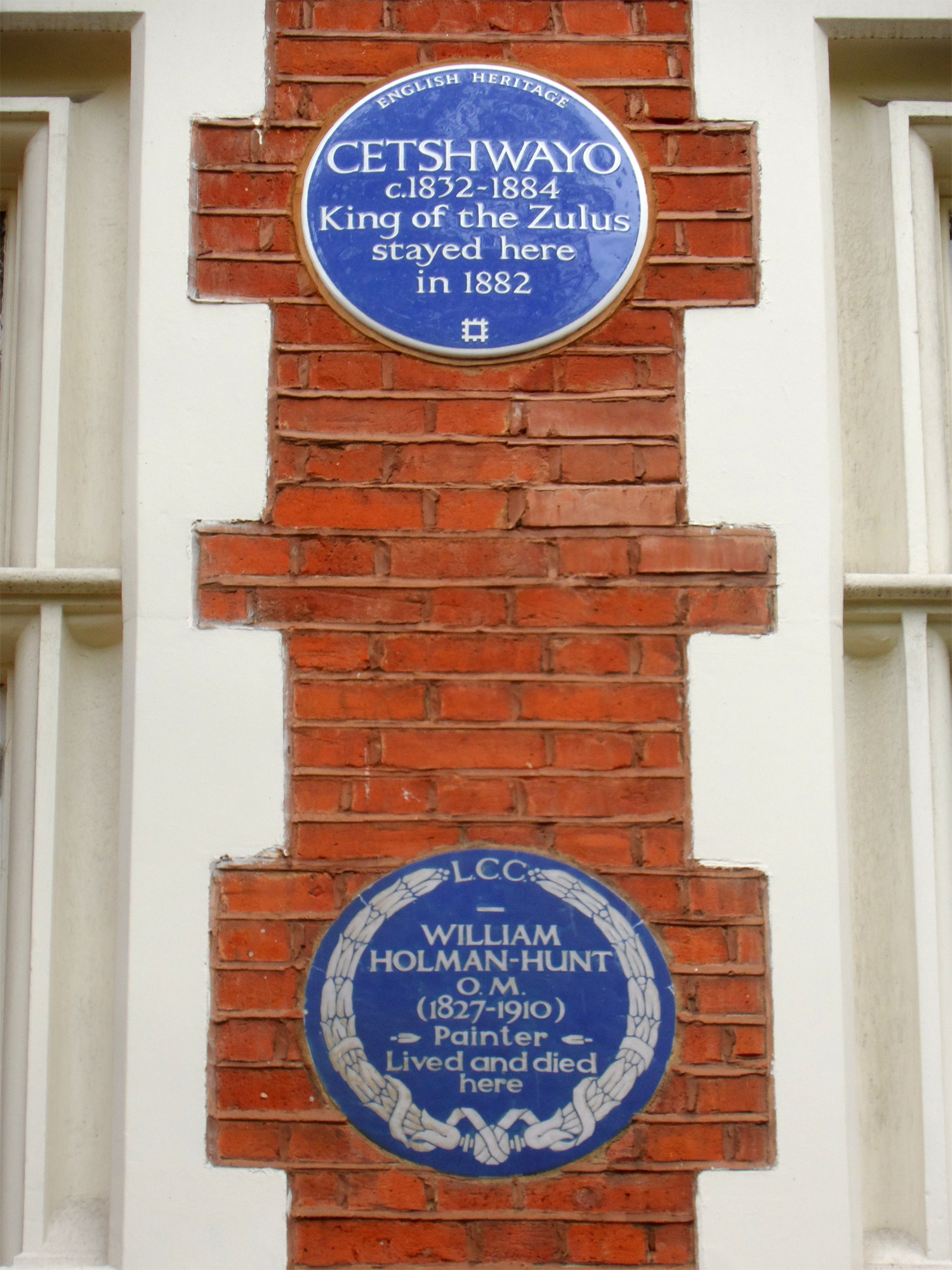
Blue plaques at 18 Melbury Road

The building is Grade II listed, along with the semi-detached and mirror-image 16 Melbury Road and a later attached studio building at 18A Melbury Road. It was the home and studio of the Pre-Raphaelite painter, William Holman Hunt, from 1903 until his death in 1910. Cetshwayo kaMpande (c.1826–1884), King of the Zulus, stayed here in 1882. Both Holman Hunt (in 1923) and Cetshwayo (in 2006) are recorded with blue plaques by English Heritage on the front of the building, one above the other.

In 1923, the MI6 British Secret Intelligence Service moved to 18 Melbury Road due to financial restrictions but moved back to Westminster within a year.

== See also ==
- Holland Park Circle
- Leighton House Museum
