= Melbury Road =

Road in Holland Park, London, England

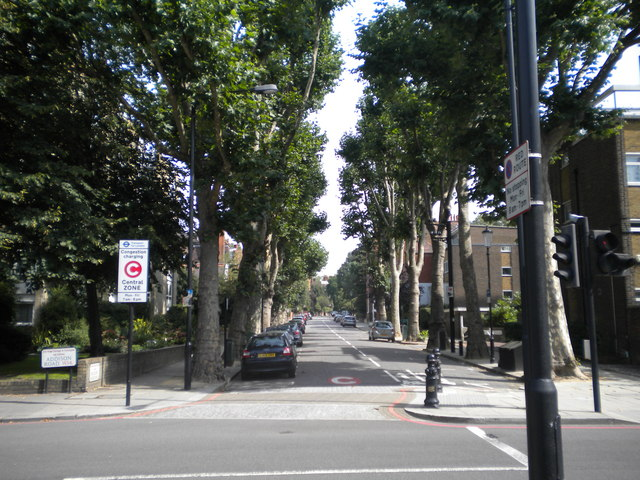
- Looking northeast along Melbury Road from Addison Road
- Interactive map of Melbury Road
- Namesake: Dorset home of the Earl of Ilchester
- Type: Street
- Length: 440 m (1,440 ft)
- Area: Holland Park
- Location: Royal Borough of Kensington and Chelsea, London, England
- Postal code: W14
- Nearest metro station: High Street Kensington tube station
- Coordinates: 51.49936°N 0.20397°W
- West end: Addison Road (A3220)
- Major junctions: Abbotsbury Road; Holland Park Road
- South end: Kensington High Street
- North: Abbotsbury Road
- East: Addison Road (A3220)
- South: Holland Park Road; Kensington High Street
- West: Design Museum

Construction
- Commissioned: 1874
- Construction start: 1875

Other
- Known for: Holland Park Circle

Melbury Road is a residential road in the Holland Park area of the Royal Borough of Kensington and Chelsea, London, England. It is known for houses owned by the Victorian Holland Park Circle, an informal group of 19th-century artists, including William Burges, Luke Fildes, Frederic Leighton, Valentine Prinsep, Hamo Thornycroft, and George Frederick Watts.

The road links Addison Road (A3220) to the west with Kensington High Street to the south. There is a junction with Holland Park Road, location of the Leighton House Museum.

== History ==
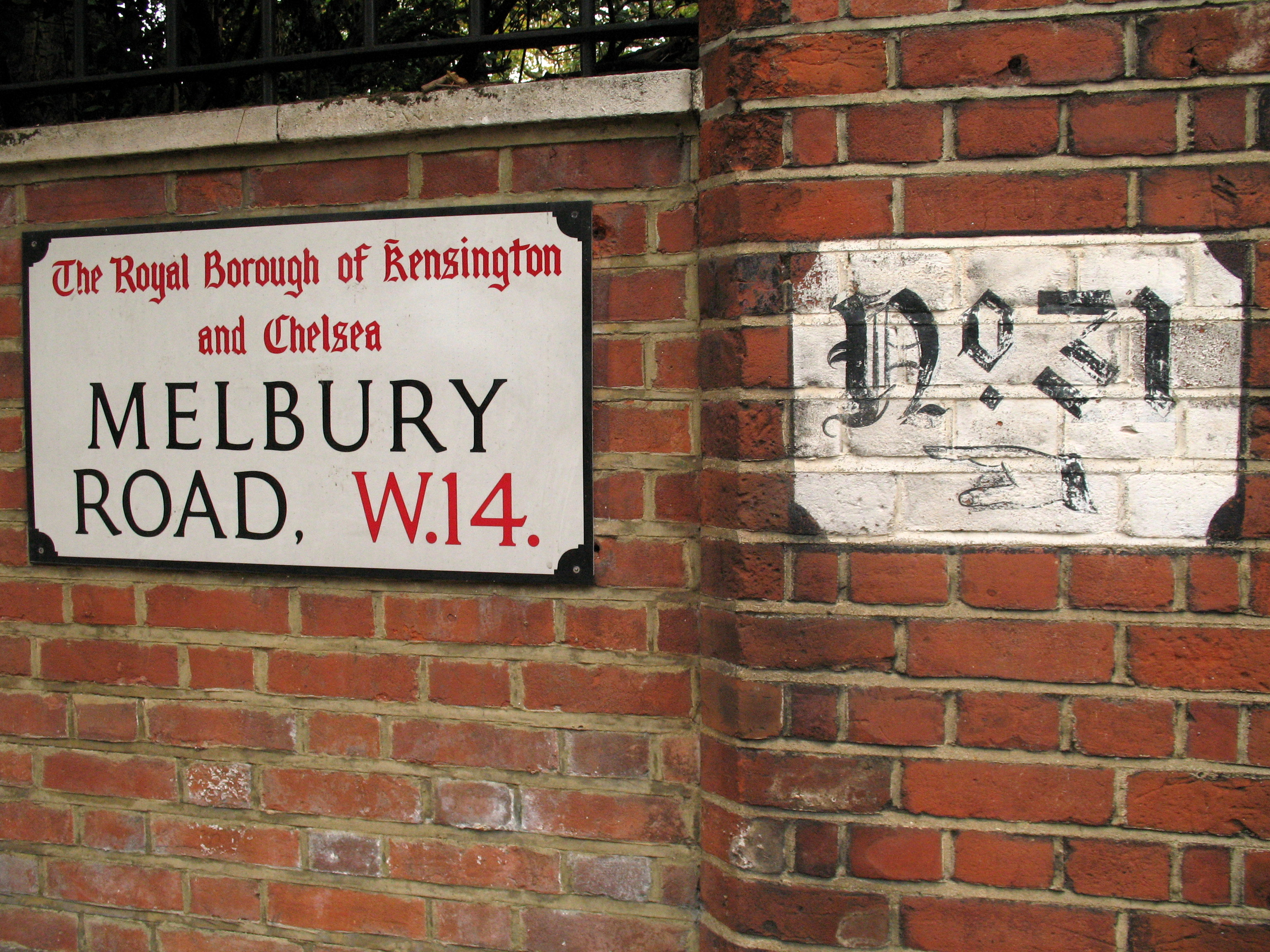
Melbury Road sign

The road was created on the Ilchester Estate, named in 1875 after the Dorset home of the Earl of Ilchester. The Kensington home of Lord Holland was demolished in 1875 to make way for the road.

== Buildings ==
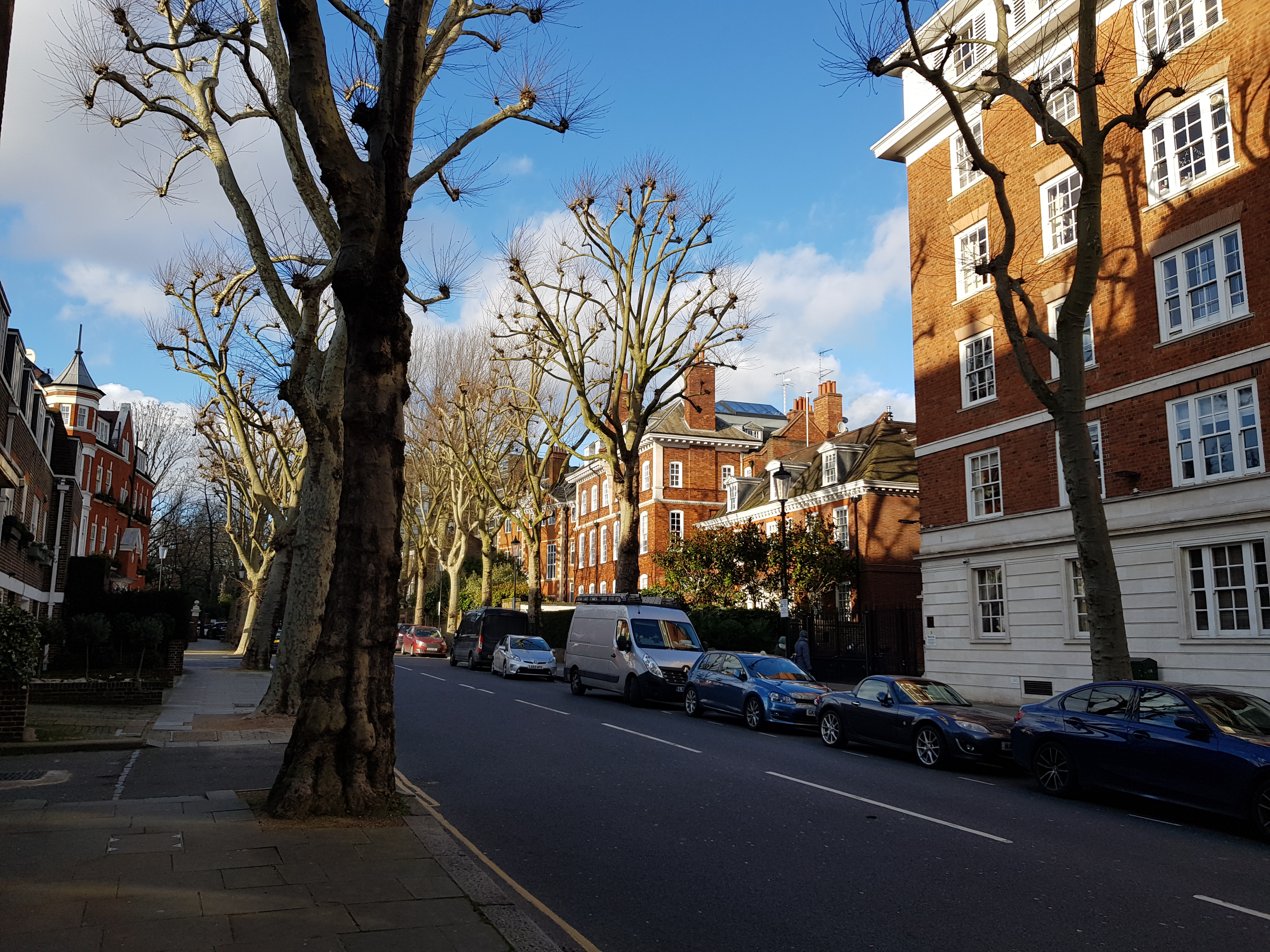
View of houses on Melbury Road

The following historic houses are of special interest, many listed and some with blue plaques for members of the Holland Park Circle and others:

- 2, 2a, and 2b Melbury Road, designed by John Belcher for the sculptors Thomas and Mary Thornycroft and their family, built 1876–7; their son Sir Hamo Thornycroft, also a sculptor, lived at 2b Melbury Road.
- 6 Melbury Road ("Little Holland House"), designed by Frederick Pepys Cockerell for George Frederick Watts, built 1875–6; gallery extension by George Aitchison, 1878; demolished 1964 and replaced in 1965 by a block of flats, Kingfisher House. Watts lived here from 1878 until his death in 1904; he and his wife, the actress Ellen Terry, also lived in an earlier house here.
- 8 Melbury Road (Grade II* listed), designed by Richard Norman Shaw for Marcus Stone, built 1875–7; later the film director Michael Powell (1905–1990) lived here during 1951–1971. Both Stone and Powell are recorded with plaques on the front of the building.
- East House, 9 Melbury Road (Grade II listed).
- 10 and 12 Melbury Road, two detached four-storey houses built by William Turner of Chelsea; demolished c.1964 and replaced by Stavordale Lodge.
- 14 Melbury Road, designed by J. J. Stevenson for Colin Hunter, built 1876; destroyed by bombing during the Second World War.
- 18 Melbury Road (Grade II listed along with Nos 16 and 18A), built by William Turner of Chelsea; home of the Pre-Raphaelite painter, William Holman Hunt, from 1903 until his death in 1910; Cetshwayo kaMpande (died 1884), King of the Zulus, stayed here in 1882. Both Holman Hunt and Cetshwayo are recorded with blue plaques on the building.
- 22 Melbury Road, home of the composer Benjamen Britten during 1948–1853; he wrote Billy Budd, Gloriana, The Little Sweep, and Spring Symphony here.
- The Tower House, 29 Melbury Road (formerly No 9, Grade I listed), designed by William Burges for himself, built 1876–8; later owned by the rock guitarist Jimmy Page.
- Woodland House, 31 Melbury Road (formerly 11, Grade II* listed), designed by Richard Norman Shaw for Luke Fildes, built 1876–7; later owned by the film director Michael Winner and then the singer Robbie Williams.
- 47 Melbury Road (Grade II listed).
- 55 and 57 Melbury Road (Grade II* listed).

== See also ==
- Holland Park
- Holland Park Circle
- List of English Heritage blue plaques in the Royal Borough of Kensington and Chelsea
