= Little Holland House =

Former dower house of Holland House, Kensington, Middlesex, England

Coordinates: 51.4994°N 0.20259°W

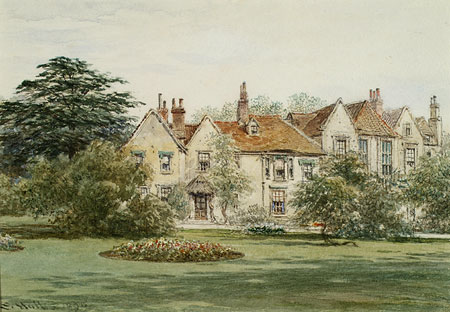
Little Holland House in the 1860s, west front, before demolition in 1871. Royal Borough of Kensington and Chelsea Libraries

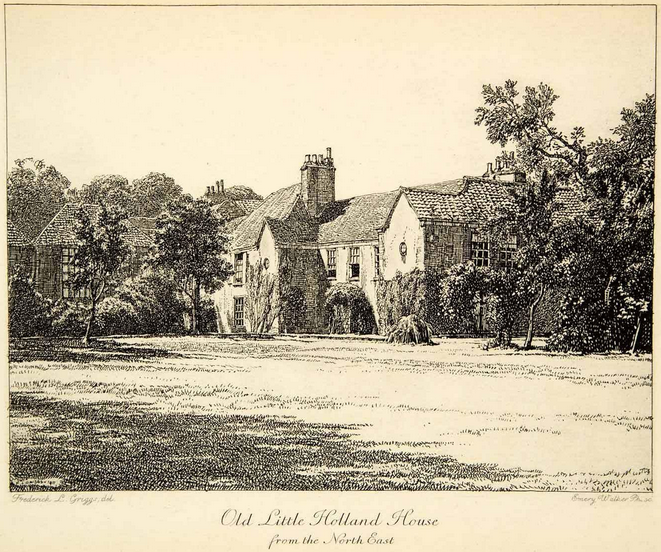
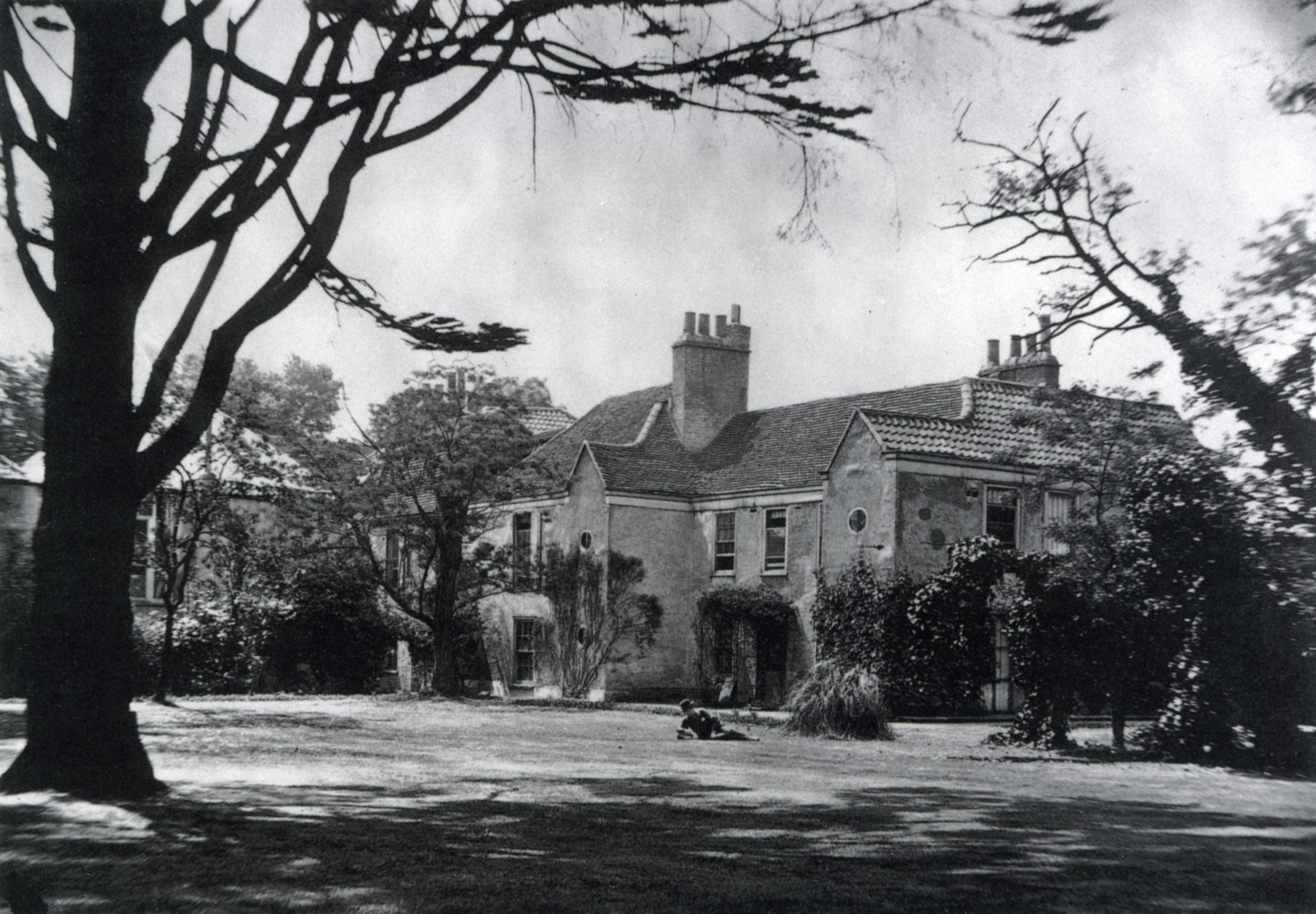
"Old Little Holland House, from the north-east", and a photograph of the same view, both pre-1871 demolition. This would be the direction of view from Holland House

Little Holland House was the dower house of Holland House in the parish of Kensington, Middlesex, England. It was situated at the end of Nightingale Lane, now the back entrance to Holland Park and was demolished when Melbury Road was made. Number 14 Melbury Road marks its approximate location.

== History ==
=== Hon. Caroline Fox (1767–1845) ===
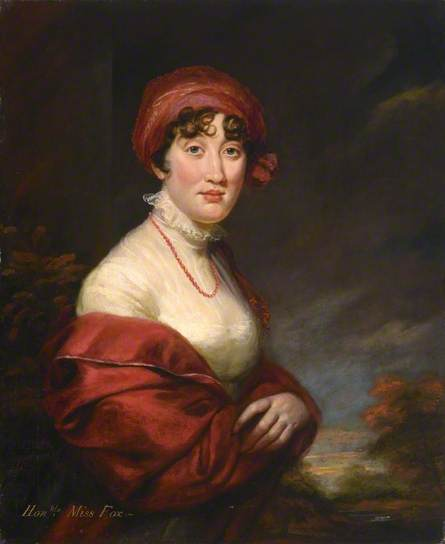
"Hon^{ble} Miss Fox", 1810 portrait by James Northcote (1746–1831) of Hon. Caroline Fox (1767–1845), then aged 43, only daughter of Stephen Fox, 2nd Baron Holland. Collection of Royal Albert Memorial Museum, Exeter, Devon

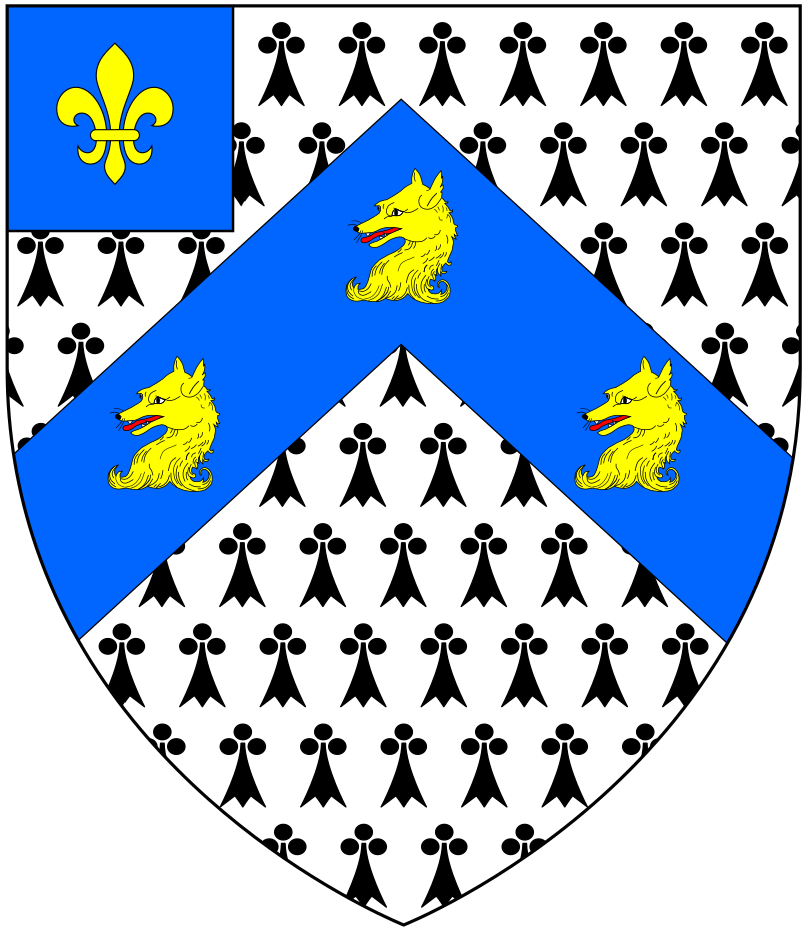
Canting arms of Fox, Baron Holland: Ermine, on a chevron azure three fox's heads and necks erased or on a canton of the second a fleur-de-lys of the third

It was occupied from before 1802 until her death in 1845 by Hon. Caroline Fox (3 November 1767 – 12 March 1845) who died there unmarried in 1845 aged 78. She was the only daughter of Stephen Fox, 2nd Baron Holland (1745–1774), of Holland House, Kensington, (son of Henry Fox, 1st Baron Holland (1705–1774) by his wife Lady Caroline Lennox (1723–1774)) by his wife Lady Mary FitzPatrick, a daughter of John FitzPatrick, 1st Earl of Upper Ossory. Hon. Caroline Fox was the only sister of Henry Vassall-Fox, 3rd Baron Holland (1773–1840), of Holland House, who owned most of the land within the manor of Kensington, and was a niece of the Whig statesman Charles James Fox (1749–1806), who made Holland House a famous meeting place of prominent Whig politicians. Her brother bequeathed it to her and she called it Paradisino. In 1842, she established a charity school (today Fox Primary School) near the site, "for the education of children of the labouring, manufacturing and other poorer classes" of Kensington. Its original location was near her home of Little Holland House, on the west side of today's Holland Park, to the west of today's number 14 Holland Park Road, a house built for the painter Val Prinsep on the Holland House estate, which is next to Leighton House (12 Holland Park Road) the house built for the painter Frederic Leighton. In 1876 it was taken over by the London School Board, which moved it to a new site in Silver Street, today the northern end of Kensington Church Street. In 1877 the original site of the school in Holland Park Road was sold by auction for £2,650, and in its place was built the present Nos. 20–30 (even) Holland Park Road, a group of six two-storey studio residences arranged around a courtyard with an arched entrance, originally called "The Studios". The school moved a third time in 1937 to its present site on Kensington Place.

=== Charles Richard Fox (1796–1873) ===
A large new house completed in 1827 and named for a while "Little Holland House" was first occupied by Charles Richard Fox (1796–1873) (the illegitimate son of Henry Richard Vassall-Fox, 3rd Baron Holland, through a liaison with Lady Webster, whom Lord Holland later married) and his wife Lady Mary Fox, illegitimate daughter of King William IV. However this was actually at Number 1 Addison Road, at the north-eastern boundary of the Holland House estate, and it is probable he was persuaded to buy the freehold from his father in order to attract other high society occupants to the new development. He also purchased from his father much land surrounding the house. After his death in 1873 Number 1 Addison Road was mostly demolished and built upon, but part of the house survives as the club-house of Holland Park Tennis Club.

=== Prinsep family ===
In 1850 Henry Thoby Prinsep (1792–1878), a director of East India Company, obtained a 21-year lease on it from Henry Fox, 4th Baron Holland (1802–1859), of Holland House, thanks to the painter George Frederic Watts (1817–1904), a friend of both the Hollands and the Prinseps. Watts, Henry's wife Sara Monckton Prinsep and her sisters including Julia Margaret Cameron lived, worked and entertained here for 21 years, making it the centre of their salon on Sunday afternoons.

When the lease expired in 1871, the Prinseps moved out and the Hollands demolished the building. Thoby Prinsep then leased a large plot of land on Melbury Road (abutting the leasehold plot of Lord Leighton) from Henry Fox-Strangways, 5th Earl of Ilchester (the heir of the 4th Baron Holland), part of which he gave to Watts. On his plot, Watts commissioned Frederick Cockerell to build a new house which he named New Little Holland House, and in which he lived from 1876 until his death in 1904. The house was demolished in 1964 after failed attempts by the London County Council to place a building preservation order on it. In its place was built a block of flats designed by Austin Blomfield, named Kingfisher House, which continues to occupy the site.

== See also ==
- Holland Park Circle, informal group of artists in the area
