= Holland Park Road =

Road in Holland Park, London, England

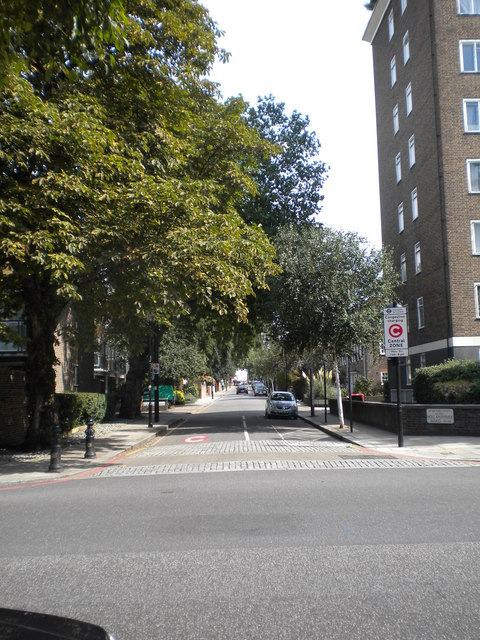
- Looking northeast along Holland Park Road from Addison Road
- Interactive map of Holland Park Road
- Type: Street
- Area: Holland Park
- Location: Royal Borough of Kensington and Chelsea, London, England
- Postal code: W14
- Nearest metro station: High Street Kensington tube station
- Coordinates: 51.49836°N 0.20336°W
- West end: Addison Road (A3220)
- East end: Melbury Road
- North: Melbury Road
- East: Addison Road (A3220)
- South: Kensington High Street
- West: Design Museum

Construction
- Construction start: 1864

Other
- Known for: Leighton House Museum, Holland Park Circle

Holland Park Road is a residential road in the Holland Park district of the Royal Borough of Kensington and Chelsea, London, England. It is especially known for Leighton House, owned by the artist Lord Frederic Leighton, President of the Royal Academy and leading light of the Victorian Holland Park Circle, an informal group of 19th-century artists, including William Burges, Luke Fildes, Frederic Leighton, Valentine Prinsep, Hamo Thornycroft, and George Frederick Watts, who lived in the area.

The road links Addison Road (A3220) to the west with Melbury Road to the east. To the south, Kensington High Street runs parallel with Holland Park Road.

== History ==
The area was formerly occupied by Holland Farm. The Kensington home of Lord Holland was demolished in 1875 to make way for Melbury Road to the north and east, but the farmhouse of Holland Farm (rebuilt in 1859) remained. From the 1860s, artists in the Holland Park Circle had homes built in Holland Park Road and from the 1870s in the adjoining Melbury Road.

== Buildings ==
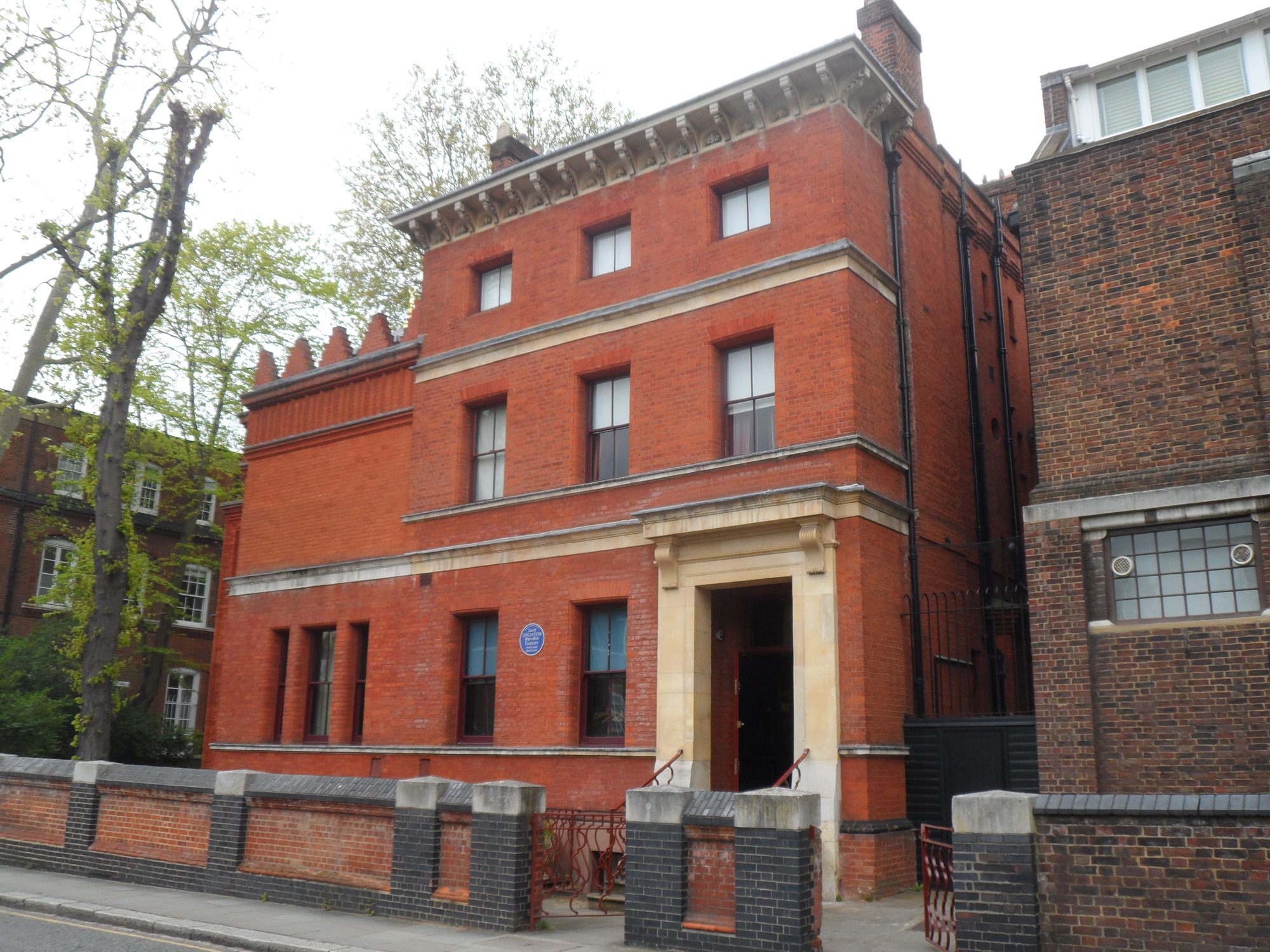
View of Leighton House, 12 Holland Park Road

The following historic homes of artists are of special interest, including some that are listed and with blue plaques:

- South House, 10–10A Holland Park Road (formerly No 3), designed by W. E. and F. Brown for the painter Sir James Jebusa Shannon, built 1892–3 (Grade II listed). 10A was originally an artist's studio and was converted into a separate residence after Shannon's death in 1923. No 10A became known as South House.
- Leighton House Museum, 12 Holland Park Road (formerly No 2), designed by George Aitchison for Frederic, Lord Leighton, built 1866, extensions added until 1895 (Grade II* listed). Kensington Borough Council acquired the house in 1926 to preserve it. The Perrin Galleries at the house opened in 1929. The house has a blue plaque commemorating Lord Leighton, installed in 1958. The interior of the gallery on the ground floor was redesigned in 1962 by Sir Hugh Casson in order to provide a temporary space for the British Theatre Museum.
- 14 Holland Park Road (formerly No 1), designed by Philip Webb for the painter Valentine Cameron Prinsep, built 1864–6 (Grade II listed). In 1948, the house was converted into flats.

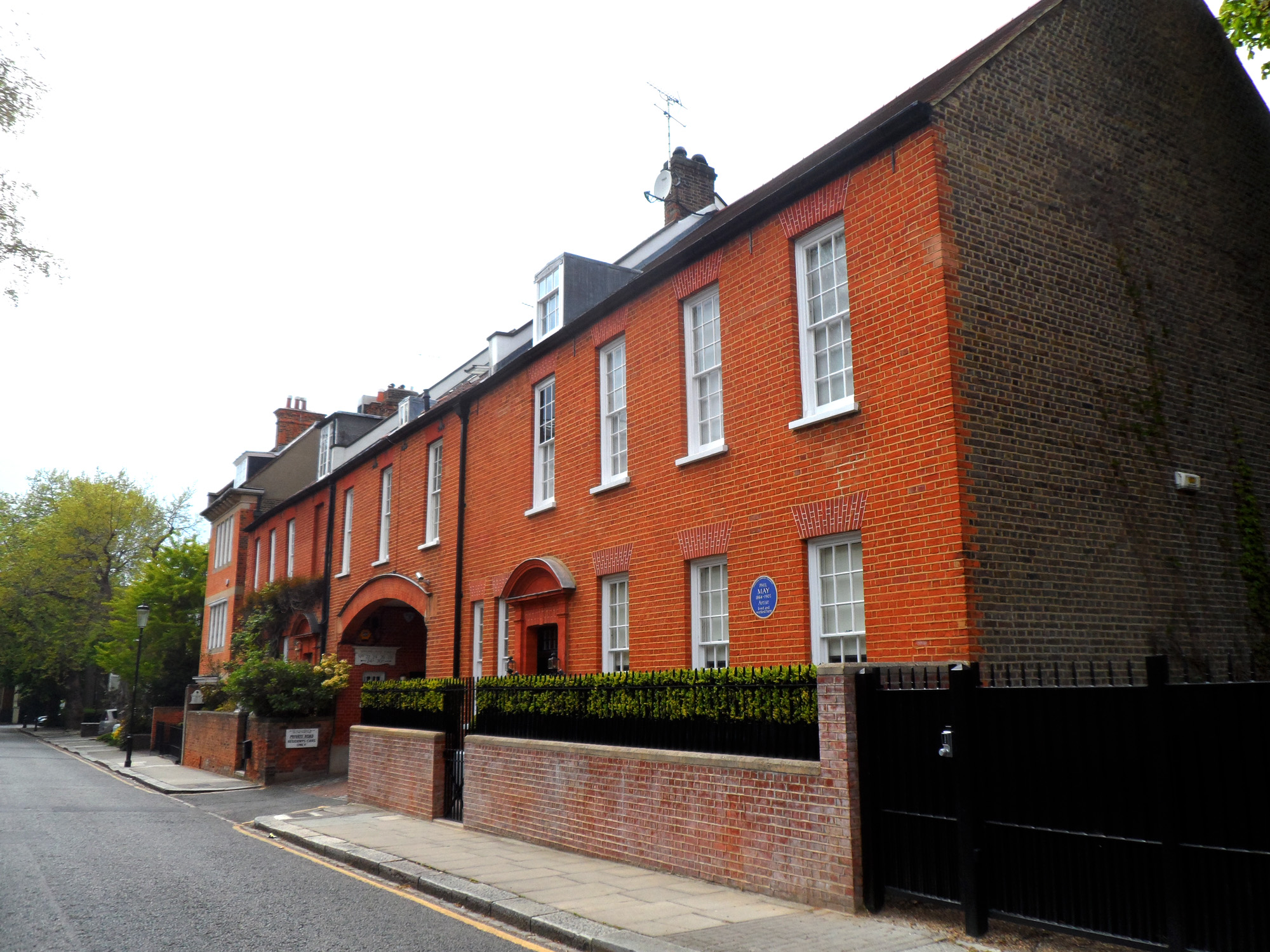
20 Holland Park Road, home of the caricaturist Phil May

- 20 Holland Park Road, home and workplace of the caricaturist Philip William May (1864–1903). The house has a blue plaque commemorating May, installed in 1982. Later the portrait painter George Spencer Watson (1869–1934) lived here. Nos 20–30 are Grade II listed.

== See also ==
- Holland Park
- Holland Park Circle
- List of English Heritage blue plaques in the Royal Borough of Kensington and Chelsea
- Melbury Road
