= Sara Prinsep =

British socialite

Sara Monckton Prinsep
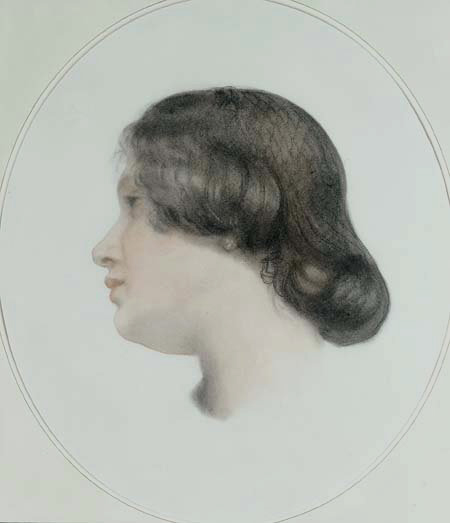
- by G F Watts c 1835
- Born: Sara Monckton Pattle; 16 August 1816; Kolkata
- Died: 5 December 1887 (aged 71); Brighton
- Occupation: socialite
- Known for: Little Holland House salon
- Spouse: (Henry) Thoby Prinsep
- Children: Valentine Prinsep, May Princep (adopted) et al

Sara Monckton Prinsep born Sara Monckton Pattle (16 August 1816 – 5 December 1887) was the leader of the Little Holland House salon in Kensington. She was a patron of George Frederick Watts.

== Life ==
Prinsep was born in Kolkata in 1816. She was one of the seven surviving daughters of Adeline Maria De l’Etang and James Peter Pattle. Her father was a civil servant in Bengal. He had a poor reputation and seven notably beautiful daughters. Sara and her sisters learned Hindustani and they also spent time in England and significantly with their maternal grandparents in Versailles. The sisters did not follow convention, and their closeness and influence was nicknamed "Pattledom". It was said that she and Julia particularly, tried to organise and interfere with other people. Nearly all of her sisters married into families with links to India and she married (Henry) Thoby Prinsep who was in the Bengal civil service.

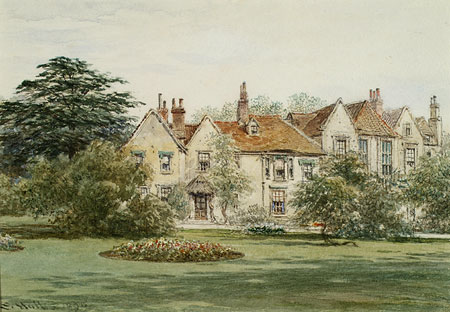
Little Holland House in the 1860s

She is known principally for Little Holland House in Kensington which she and her husband rented in 1850. The introduction to the owners was made by their friend, the painter, George Frederick Watts. It was said, with some truth, that they invited Watts to stay for a few days and he stayed for twenty years. Watts enjoyed free accommodation and he became the key member of the salon that Sara and her sisters created. Key figures were invited to stay and important friendships were made. Watts painted and then married the actress Ellen Terry but the marriage lasted less than a year. She was thirty years younger than Watts and Prinsep did not make her welcome at Little Holland House.

Sara was known as Dash, her sister Julia Margaret Cameron was nicknamed "Talent" and another sister Virginia was called "Beauty". Few records remain of the salon but Ellen Terry met Disraeli and Gladstone and Julia's protographs of people include Robert Browning, William Thackery, Dante Rossetti, John Ruskin, James Whistler, Alfred Tennyson, Leslie Stephen and the resident houseguest G. F. Watts. The Little Holland House salon is said to be the precursor for the later more influential Bloomsbury Group with several interlinking characters.

Prinsep died in 1887 in Brighton.

== Family ==
On 14 May 1835, she married and they had one daughter, three sons and an adopted daughter:

- Alice Marie Prinsep who married Charles Gurney, son of Daniel Gurney (1791–1880)
- Sir Henry Thoby Prinsep, a judge of the high court at Calcutta, in March 1904, he was made a Knights Commander of India (KCIE).
- Valentine Cameron Prinsep, RA
- Arthur Haldimand Prinsep CB, major-general of the Bengal cavalry
- May Prinsep was her husband's orphaned niece

== Legacy ==
In 2025-2026 the Watts Gallery near Guildford held an exhibition 'Women of Influence: The Pattle Sisters' exploring the lives, influence, and legacy of the seven Anglo-Indian Pattle sisters.
