= Addison Road, London =

Street in the Royal Borough of Kensington and Chelsea

Addison Road
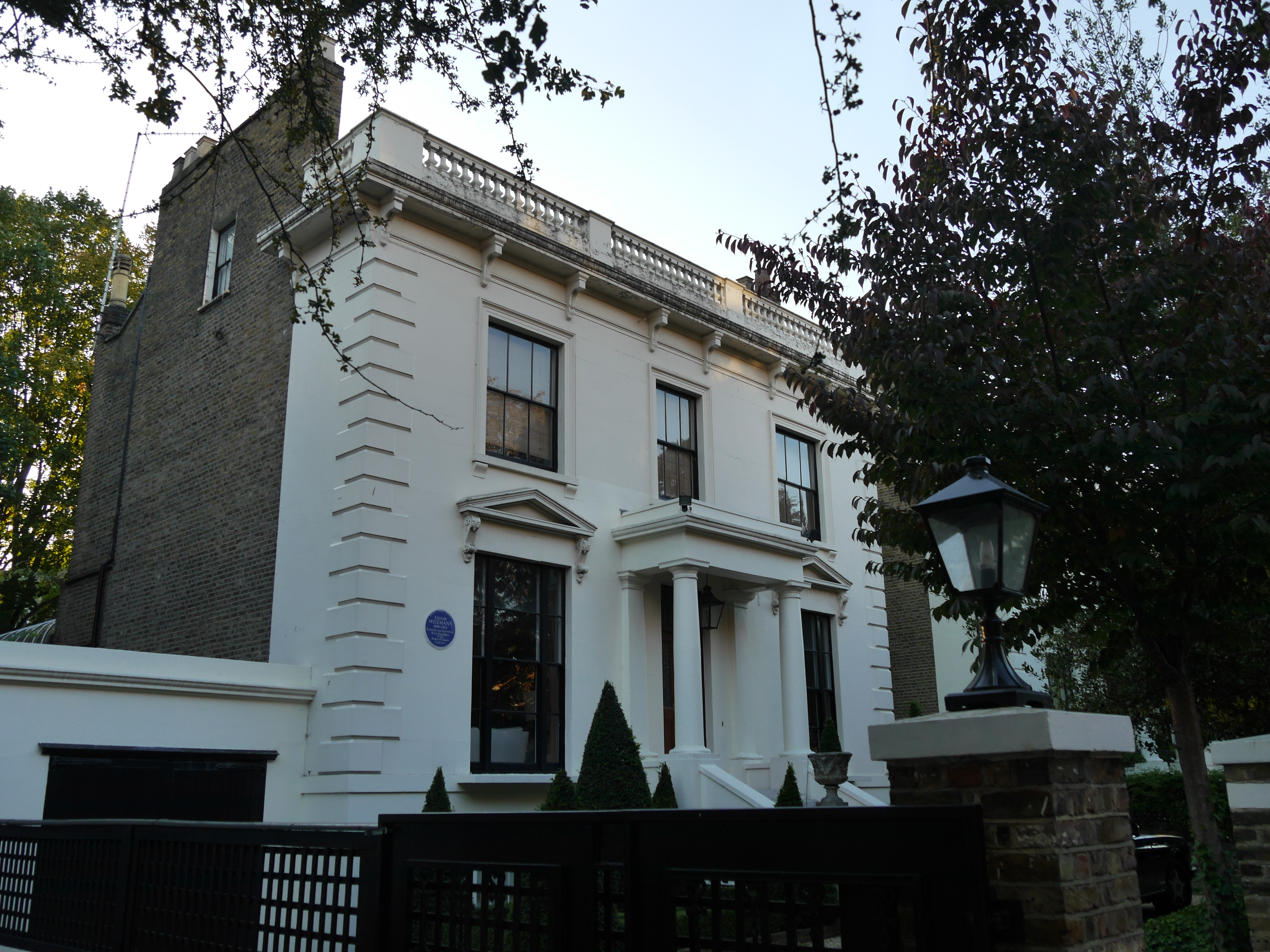
- A typical James Hall villa at 67 Addison Road
- Interactive map of Addison Road
- Namesake: Joseph Addison (1672–1719), essayist and statesman
- Type: Street
- Location: Royal Borough of Kensington and Chelsea, London, England
- Postal code: W14
- Nearest metro station: Holland Park tube station
- Coordinates: 51.50246°N 0.20932°W
- North end: Holland Park Avenue
- Major junctions: Holland Park Gardens, Melbury Road, Holland Park Road
- South end: Kensington High Street
- North: Addison Avenue
- East: Woodsford Square
- South: Warwick Gardens
- West: Addison Crescent

Construction
- Construction start: 1820s

Other
- Known for: Literary connections; expensive properties

Addison Road is a road in London, England, which connects Kensington High Street with Notting Hill and Holland Park Avenue, and runs nearby to Holland Park. Along with nearby Ilchester Place and Holland Villas Road, it is often cited among London's most expensive residential roads.

To the east is Holland Park. To the west is Holland Road and West Kensington. A portion of the road forms part of the A3220 leading to Warwick Gardens south of the junction with Kensington High Street.

== History and residents ==
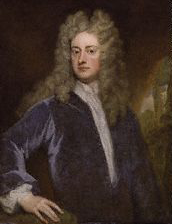
Joseph Addison (1672–1719), essayist and statesman, after whom Addison Road is named.

The name of the road derives from the essayist and statesman Joseph Addison (1672–1719), as with Addison Avenue nearby.

The road was begun in the 1820s. The church of St Barnabas at No. 23 was built in 1829, designed by Lewis Vulliamy in a Tudor Gothic style, with later stained glass by Edward Burne-Jones (executed by Morris & Co.) and Byam Shaw. St James Norlands Church at the far end of Addison Avenue, also designed by Vulliamy, was built in 1845.

Most houses on the west side of Addison Road were built by James Hall in the 1850s with similar proportions to those on Addison Crescent and Holland Villas Road.

Debenham House at 8 Addison Road was designed for Sir Ernest Debenham in 1905–6 by Halsey Ricardo. The Arts and Crafts-style house is an example of "structural polychromy". It includes Byzanto-Italianate grey bricks, Doulton Carrara ware, green-glazed bricks, and turquoise tiles. Inside, there is a dome and Arts and Crafts decoration. Today, the house is often used for filming purposes. Although no longer privately owned, it is estimated to be worth between £40–50 million.

Kensington Station, now Kensington (Olympia), was named 'Addison Road' station from 1869 to 1916 until the London & Southwestern Railway's Richmond to Waterloo service via Shepherd's Bush was discontinued.

Addison Road is home to the Cardinal Vaughan Memorial School, a Roman Catholic boys' school (which permits entry to girls in its Sixth Form).

== Notable residents ==
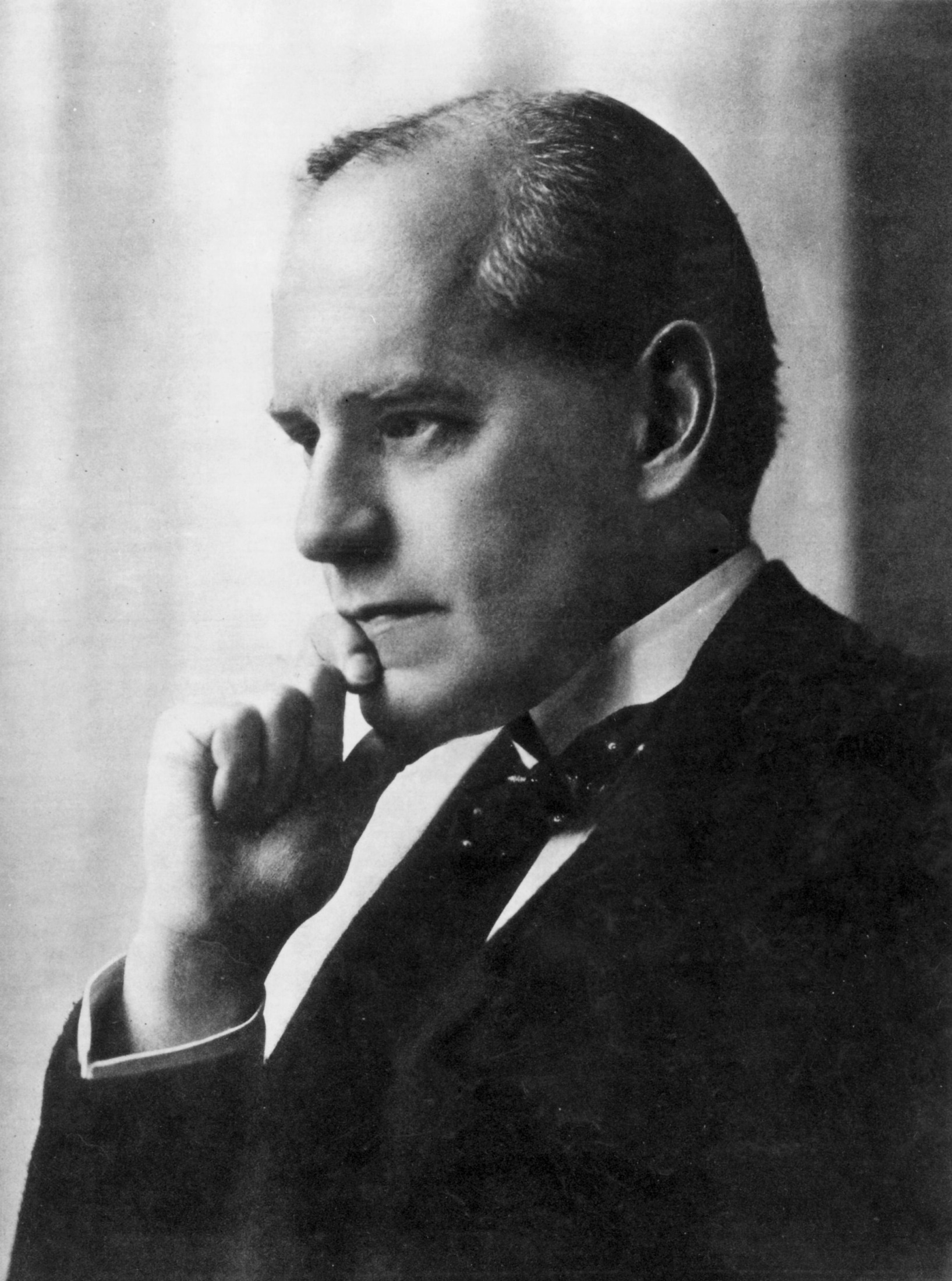
John Galsworthy, novelist and playwright, lived at 14 Addison Road

The novelist and playwright John Galsworthy lived at 14 Addison Road from 1905 to 1913, as did Joseph Conrad and Radclyffe Hall at other times. Other notable inhabitants have included: Chaim Weizmann, the first president of the State of Israel, who lived at No. 67 between 1916 and 1919; David Lloyd George, who resided at No. 2 between 1928 and 1936; James Locke, who is credited with giving Tweed its name, and the architect Eustace Balfour.

== See also ==
- List of eponymous roads in London
- Addison's Walk, Oxford
