= 8 Melbury Road =

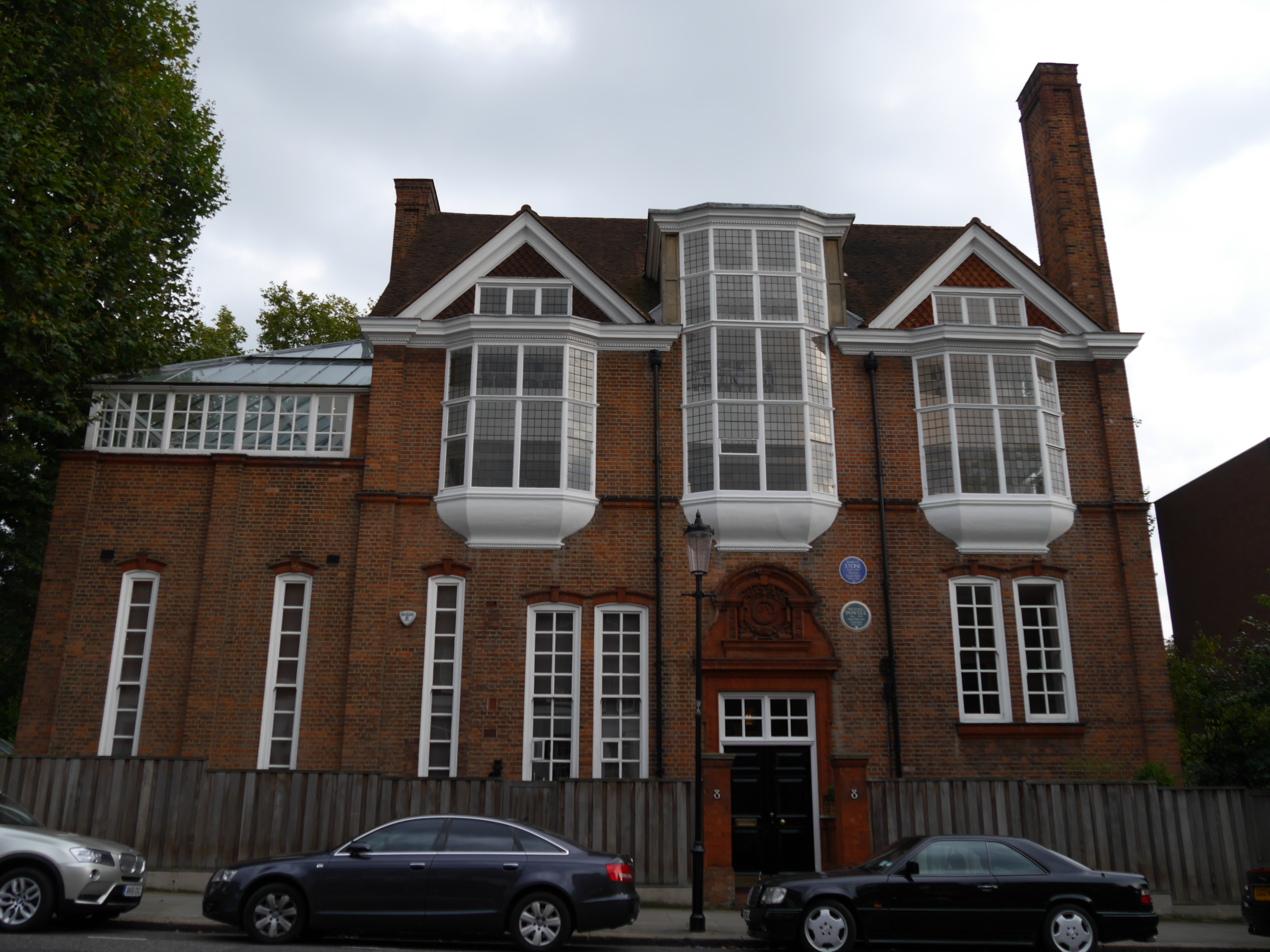
- 8 Melbury Road

- Location within Greater London
- 51°29′57.28″N 0°12′13.49″W
- Location: Melbury Road, Holland Park, West London, England

History
- Built: 1875

Site notes
- Architect: Richard Norman Shaw
- Architectural style: Queen Anne style
- Governing body: Privately owned

Listed Building – Grade II*
- Official name: 8 Melbury Road
- Designated: 30 August 1961
- Reference no.: 1225615

8 Melbury Road is a large detached house at the Holland Park district of Kensington and Chelsea, W14 in England. Built in the Queen Anne style by the architect Richard Norman Shaw, it is a Grade II* listed building.

It was commissioned by the painter Marcus Stone as a "studio-home" for himself. The house was designed by architect Richard Norman Shaw in the Queen Anne style. Shaw was well acquainted with members of the art establishment, being friends with Dante Gabriel Rossetti, William Morris and Philip Webb. The choice by Fildes and Stone of Richard Norman Shaw as the architect of their houses was an important symbol of their ambition to become academicians, members of the Royal Academy of Arts, and of the art establishment themselves. The imposing houses and studios that Shaw designed would impress potential patrons. The house is next to the home of George Frederick Watts, and backs on to the garden of the Leighton House Museum, the former "studio-home" of Frederic, Lord Leighton. Stone's studio occupied the whole of the first floor of the house. The house is now separated into flats.

Following Stone's death the house was occupied by artist Percyval Tudor-Hart. The film director Michael Powell lived at the house from 1951 to 1971 and shot parts of his controversial 1960 film Peeping Tom at the house.

It was the first of two houses in Melbury Road designed by Shaw, the second, Woodland House, 11 Melbury Road (now 31), was designed for fellow painter Luke Fildes. Fildes and Stone were artistic rivals and each naturally regarded their own Shaw-designed house as superior. Luke Fildes wrote of his house that it was "a long way the most superior house of the whole lot; I consider it knocks Stone's to fits, though of course he wouldn't have that by what I hear he says of his, but my opinion is the universal one."

Stone moved into 8 Melbury Road with his wife, Laura Broun, the daughter of a merchant. Stone and Luke Fildes were the first two artists to build studio-houses in Melbury Road.

In 1994, English Heritage commemorated Stone with a blue plaque at 8 Melbury Road. A green plaque placed by the Directors Guild of Great Britain on the house commemorates Michael Powell.

== Bibliography ==
- Dakers, Caroline. (1999) The Holland Park Circle: Artists and Victorian Society Yale University Press ISBN 978-0-30008-164-0
- Fletcher, Pamela. "Stone, Marcus Clayton". Oxford Dictionary of National Biography (online ed.). Oxford University Press. doi:10.1093/ref:odnb/101036. (Subscription, Wikipedia Library access or UK public library membership required.); cited as "StoneODNB"
