= 2b Melbury Road =

Grade II listed house in Holland Park, London

Coordinates: 51.498857°N 0.204895°W

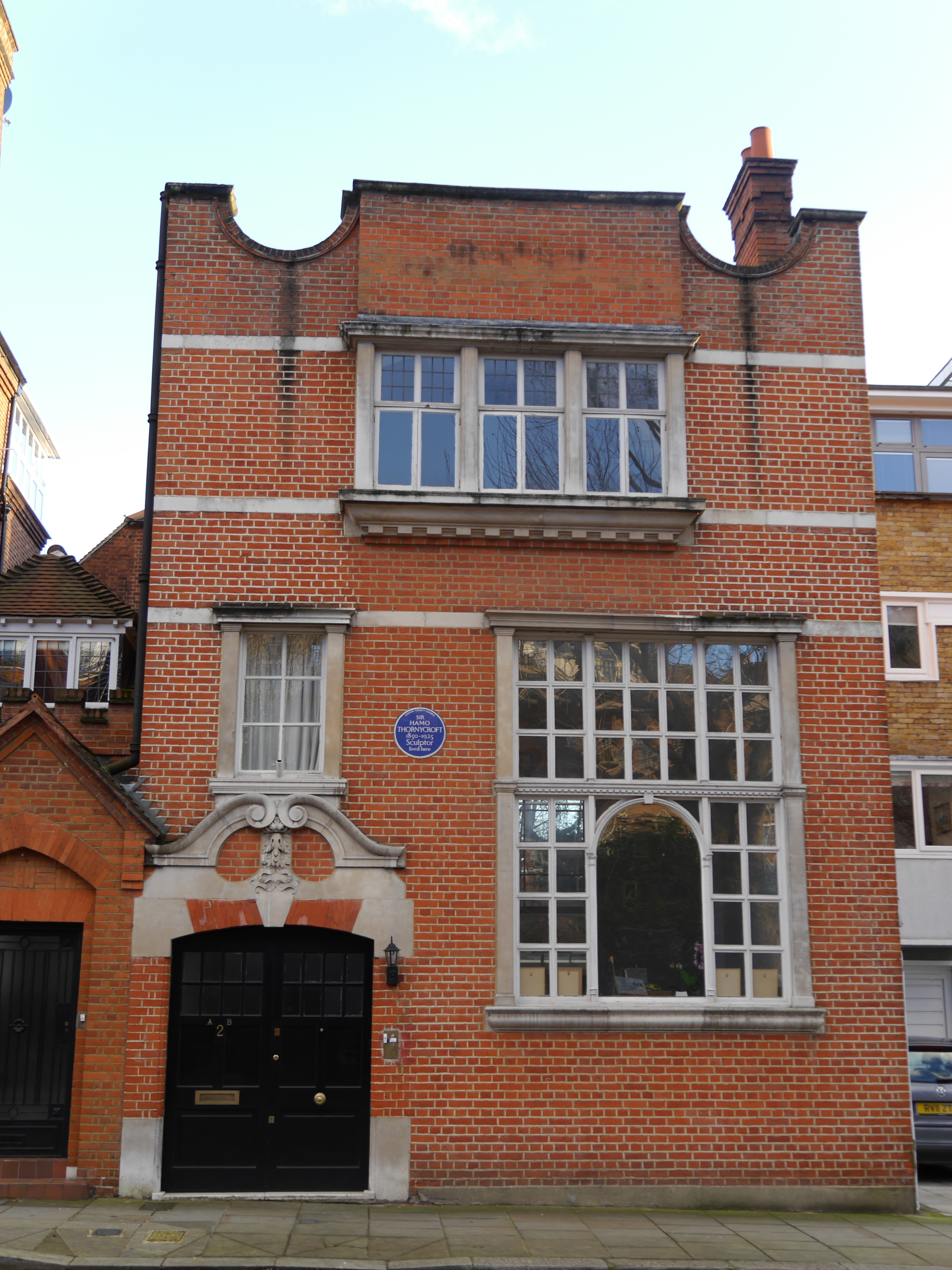
2b Melbury Road in 2015

2b Melbury Road is a Grade II listed house in Melbury Road, Holland Park, London W14, built in 1877 by Sir John Belcher.

It was home to the sculptor Sir Hamo Thornycroft, to whom there is a blue plaque on the façade.
