= Valentine Cameron Prinsep =

British painter

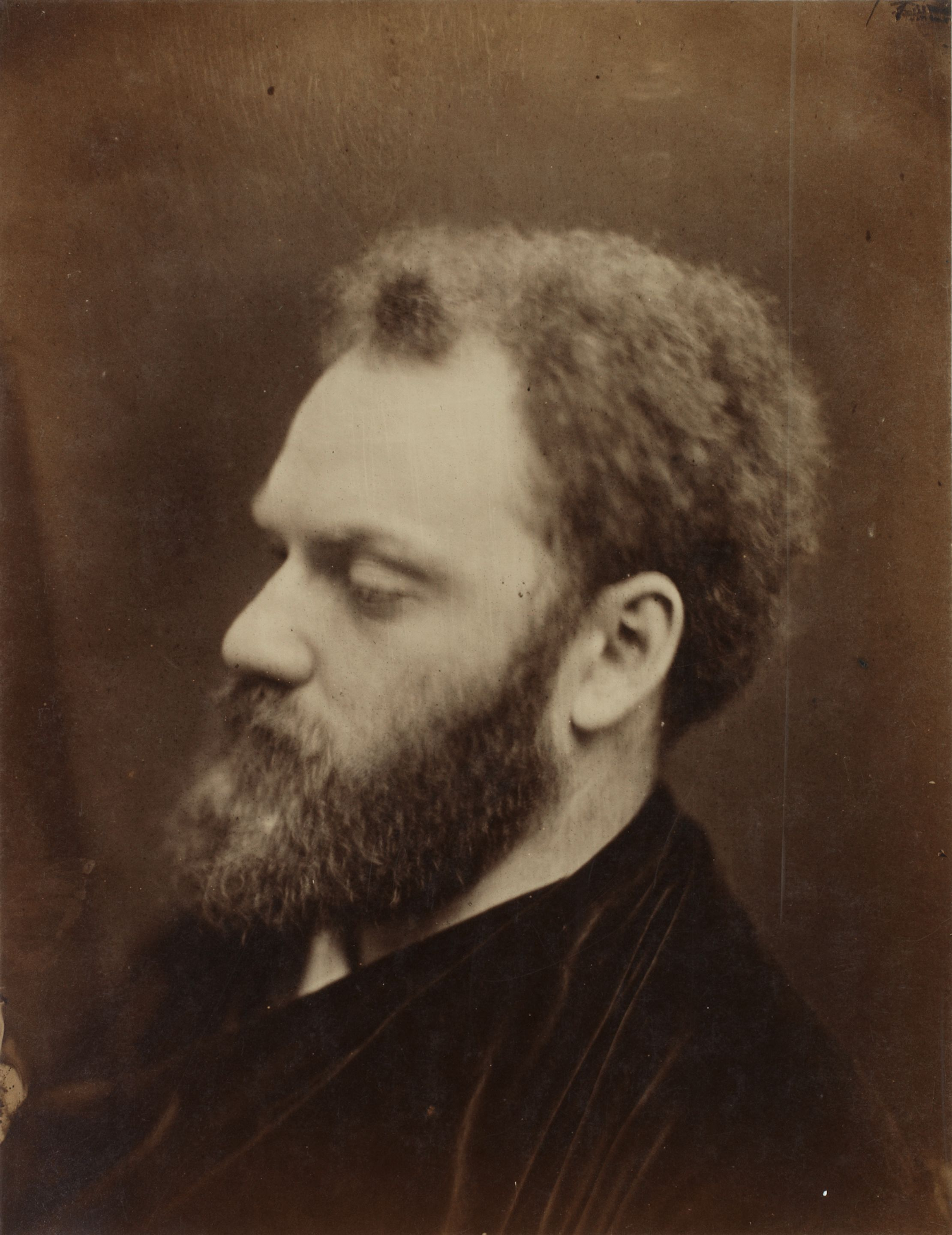
- Valentine Cameron Prinsep (1867) by Julia Margaret Cameron
- Born: 14 February 1838; Calcutta, India
- Died: 4 November 1904 (aged 66); London
- Known for: oil painting
- Movement: Pre-Raphaelite
- Spouse: Florence Leyland (m. 1884)
- Children: 3
- Parent(s): Henry Prinsep; Sara Monckton Prinsep
- Relatives: Julia Margaret Cameron (aunt); Marie Lohr (daughter-in-law); Margaret Bannerman (daughter-in-law); Anita Elson (daughter-in-law)

Valentine Cameron Prinsep RA (14 February 1838 – 4 November 1904) was a British painter of the Pre-Raphaelite school.

== Early life ==
Born in Calcutta, India, he was the second child of Henry Thoby Prinsep, a civil servant of the British Raj, and his wife Sara Monckton Pattle. His home was shared by the painter George Frederick Watts and the Little Holland House salon. His mother was a sister of the photographer Julia Margaret Cameron and Maria Jackson (née Pattle), grandmother of Virginia Woolf and Vanessa Bell.

Henry and Sara Prinsep returned to England in 1843. They settled in 1851 at Little Holland House, and made it a centre of artistic society.

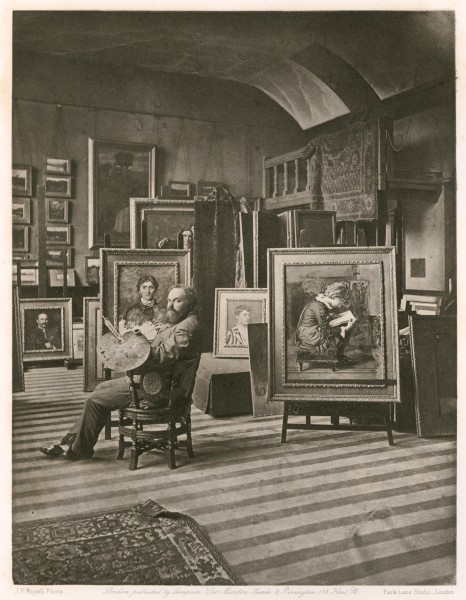
Prinsep, 1883 by Frank Dudman

== Studies, travel, painter ==
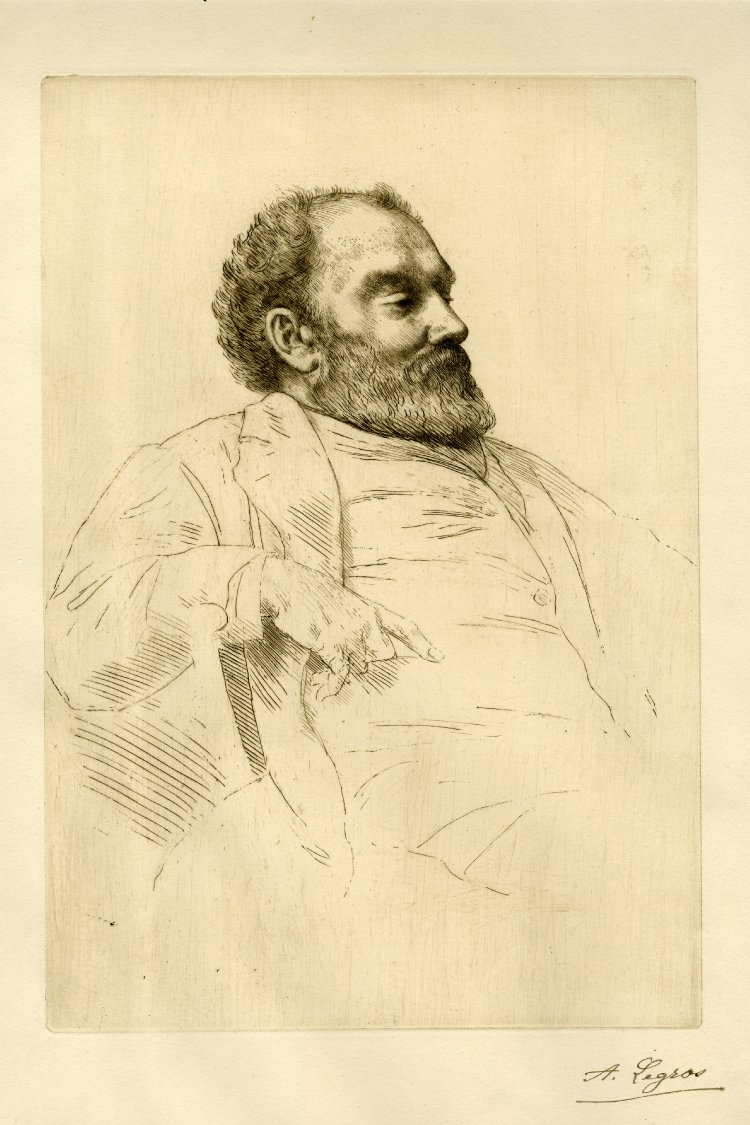
Portrait of Prinsep by Alphonse Legros, British Museum

Henry Thoby Prinsep was a friend of the painter George Frederic Watts, under whom his son first studied, and travelled with Watts in 1856–57 to Sir Charles Thomas Newton's excavation of Halicarnassus. Valentine then went to Charles Gleyre's atelier in Paris. There James Abbott McNeill Whistler, Edward Poynter, and George du Maurier were among his fellow students, and he was later the original for Taffy in Du Maurier's novel Trilby. After Paris, Prinsep passed to Italy. With Edward Burne-Jones he visited Siena and there made the acquaintance of Robert Browning, of whom he saw much in Rome during the winter of 1859–60.

Prinsep was a close friend of John Everett Millais, and of Burne-Jones, with whom he travelled further in Italy. He had a share with Dante Gabriel Rossetti and others in the decoration of the hall of the Oxford Union. With other members of the Pre-Raphaelite Brotherhood, he taught at the Working Men's College during the mid-19th century. He first exhibited at the Royal Academy of Arts in 1862 with his Bianca Capella, his first picture, which attracted notice as a portrait (1866) of General Gordon in Chinese costume. Prinsep lent the costume to Millais who used it in his own painting Esther.

From 1862 to his death Prinsep was an annual exhibitor at the Royal Academy. He was elected A.R.A. in 1879 and R.A. in 1894. His marriage in 1884 made Prinsep a wealthy man, and he became a company director and landowner.

He was an enthusiastic volunteer and one of the founders of the Artists Rifles in 1859.

== Death and monument ==
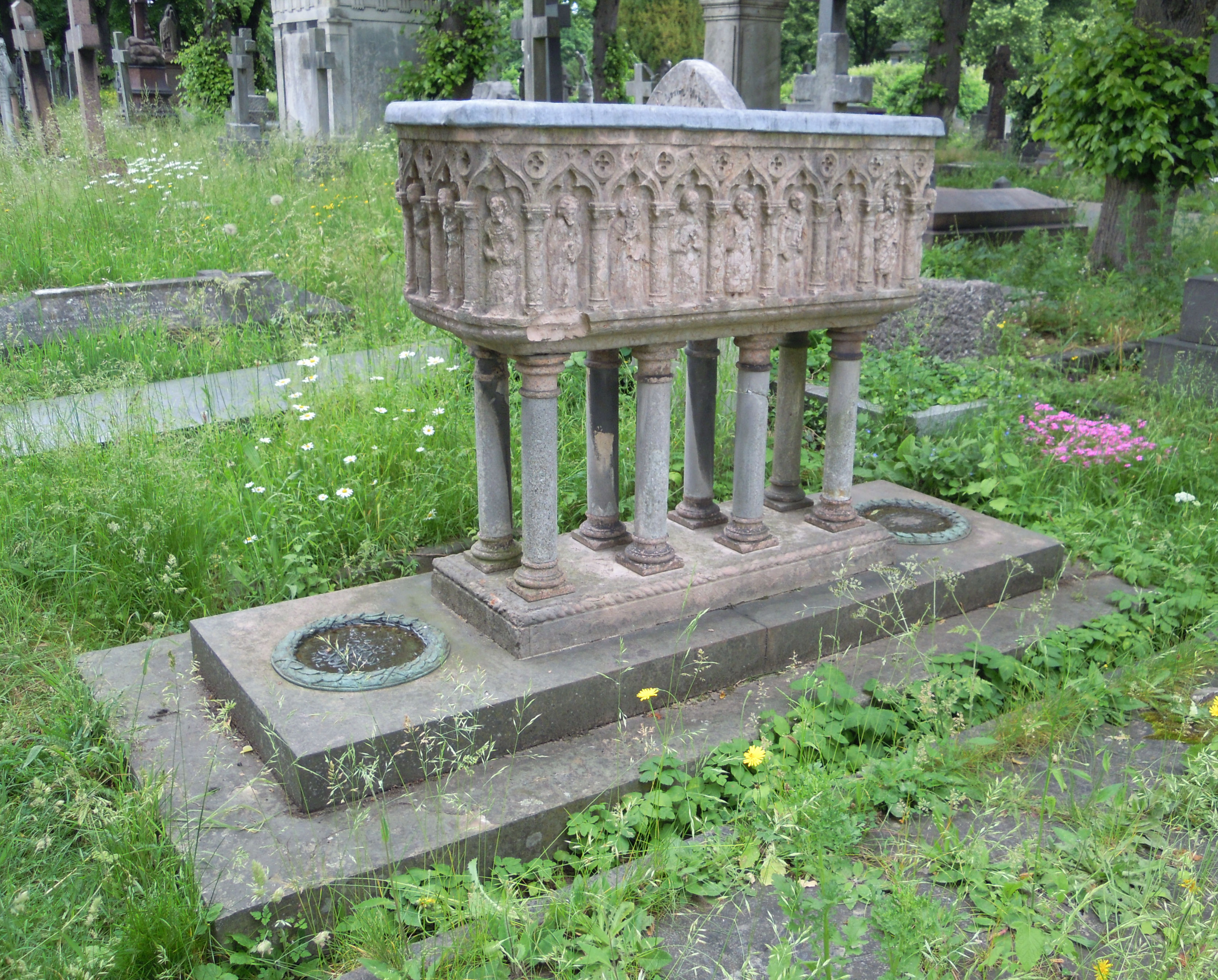
Monument in Brompton Cemetery, London

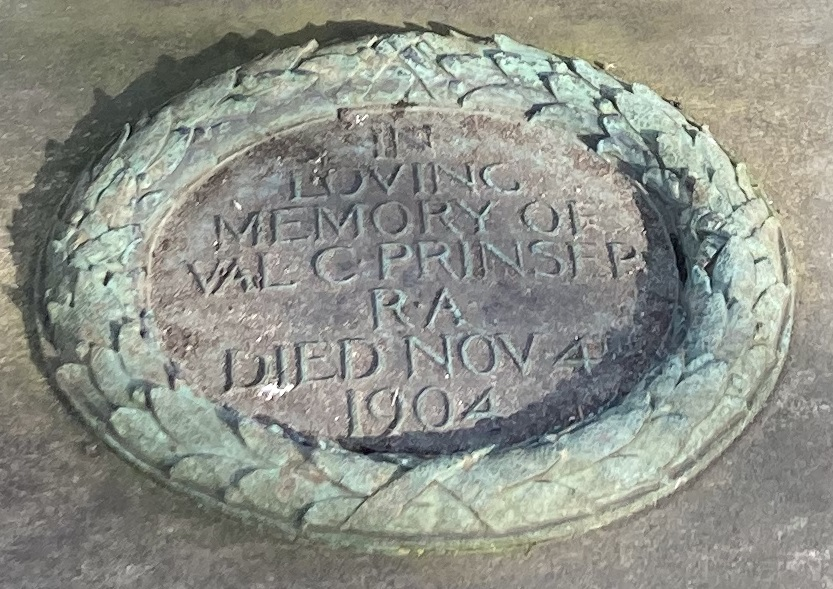
Inscription on the grave of Valentine Cameron Prinsep

Prinsep died at Holland Park, west London in 1904, and is buried in Brompton Cemetery, London. He was buried with his wife Florence. Their distinctive monument lies on the western path between the north entrance and the central buildings. It has a stepped plinth with bronze plaques surmounted by a tomb chest on eight columns. The chest is carved with 14th-century style figures in a colonnade of ogee arches. The monument is Grade II listed.

== Works ==
Prinsep's major paintings were Miriam watching the infant Moses (exhibited at the Royal Academy in 1867), A Venetian lover (1868), Bacchus and Ariadne (1869), News from abroad (1871), The linen gatherers (1876), The gleaners, and A minuet.

In 1877, Prinsep returned to India and painted a huge picture of the Delhi Durbar. It was a commission from Robert Bulwer-Lytton, 1st Earl of Lytton, the Viceroy of India. It was exhibited in 1880 at the Royal Academy, presented to Queen Victoria and afterwards hung at Buckingham Palace. This "colossal work" attracted press comment, positive and negative. Later exhibits were À Versailles, The Emperor Theophilus chooses his Wife, The Broken Idol and The Goose Girl.

Prinsep wrote two plays, Cousin Dick and Monsieur le Duc, produced at the Royal Court Theatre and the St James's Theatre theatres respectively; two novels; and Imperial India: an Artist's Journal (1879).

== Family ==
Prinsep married in 1884 Florence née Leyland, daughter of Frederick Richards Leyland of Wootten Hall, Liverpool. She survived him, they had three sons.

- Frederick Thoby Leyland (1886–1936), a shipping director. He married Françoise Catherine Pauline Greenall, she survived him.
- Anthony Leyland (1888–1942), a theatre manager. He married Marie Lohr in 1912, they divorced in 1928. He married Margaret Bannerman in 1928, they divorced in 1939.
- Nicholas John Andrew Leyland (1894–1983), a stockbroker. He married Anita Elson in 1930, they divorced in 1936. He married Celia Glyn in 1938, she survived him.

== Gallery ==
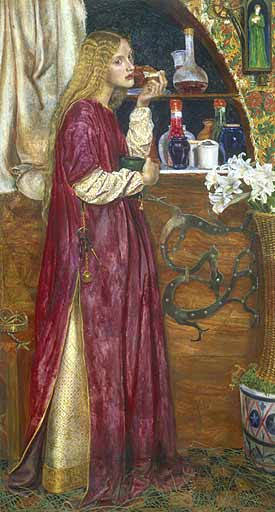
The Queen was in the Parlour (1860; Manchester Art Gallery)

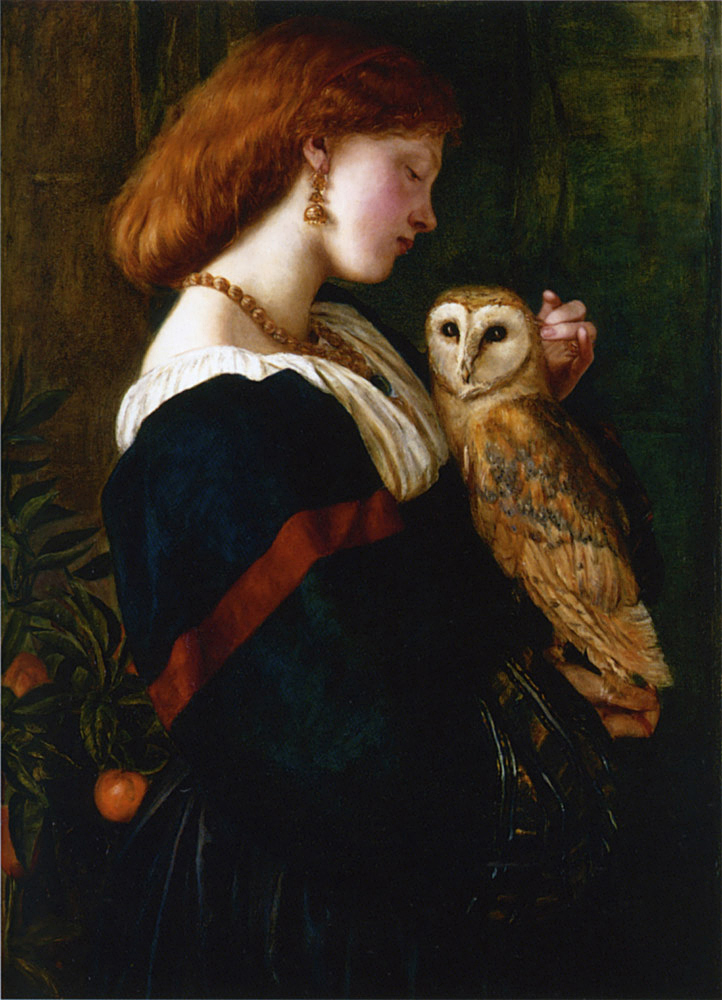
The Owl, c.1863

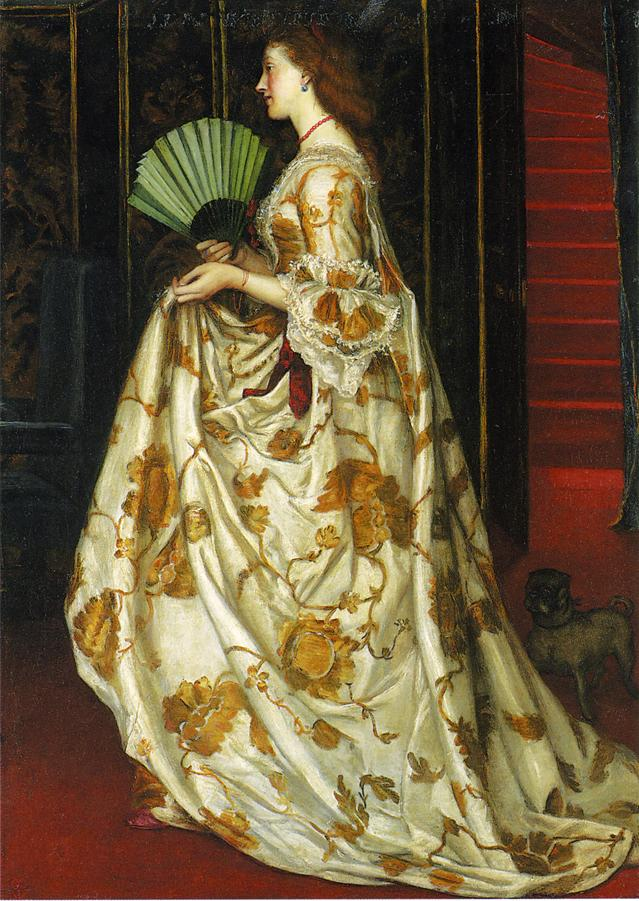
My Lady Betty, c. 1864

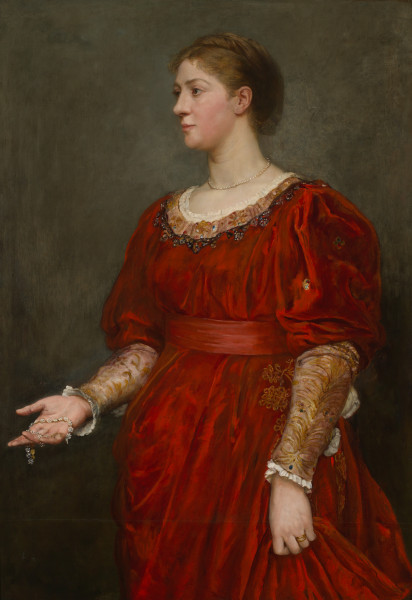
Dame Madge Kendal (1880)

== Sources ==
- This article incorporates text from a publication now in the public domain: Gibson, Frank W. (1912). "Prinsep, Valentine Cameron". In Lee, Sidney (ed.). Dictionary of National Biography (2nd supplement). Vol. 3. London: Smith, Elder & Co.
