= Leighton House =

Historic house in London, England

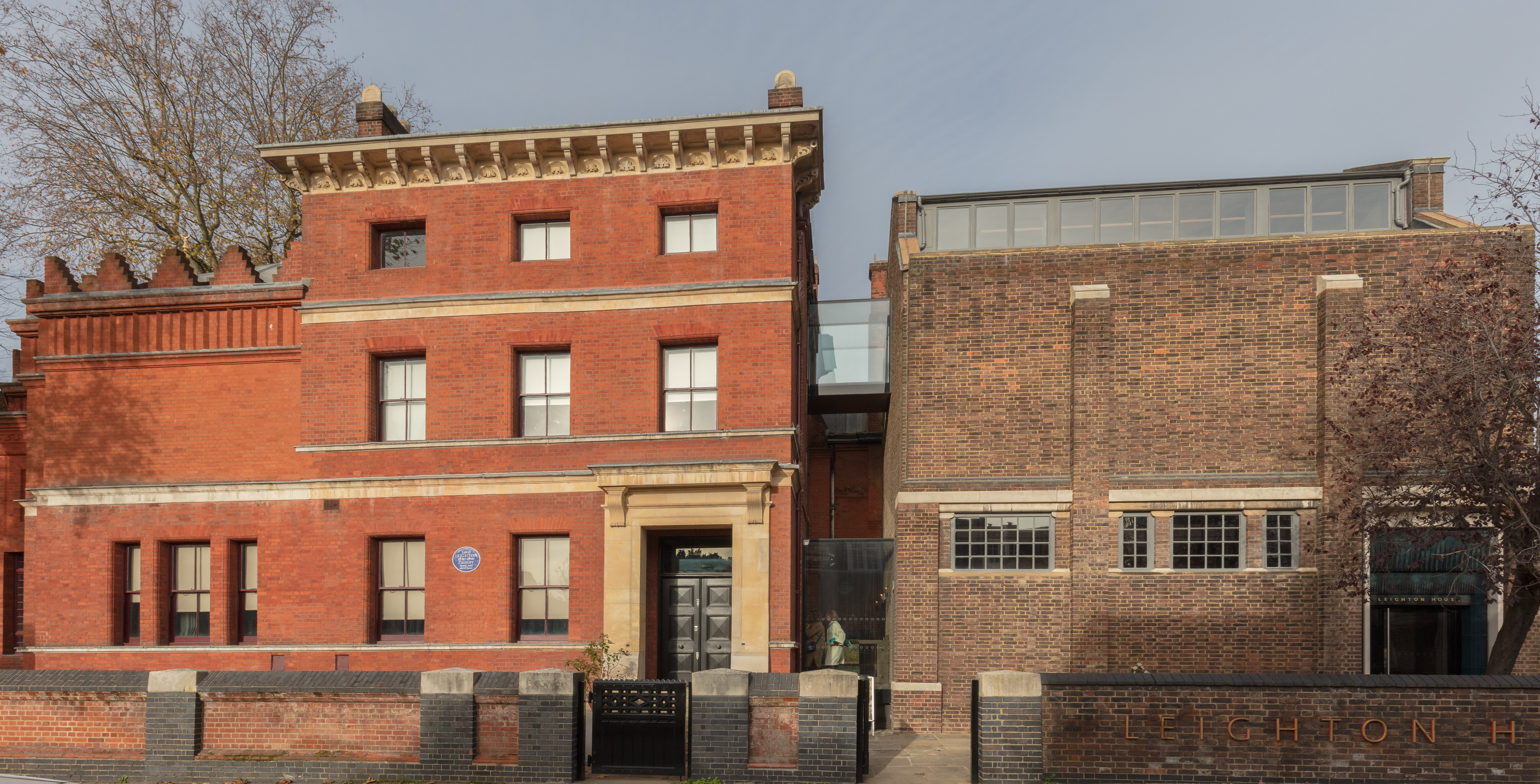
- View of the house from Holland Park Road

- Location within Royal Borough of Kensington and Chelsea
- 51°29′54.89″N 0°12′11.12″W
- Location: Holland Park; London, W14; United Kingdom

History
- Built: 1866–1895

Site notes
- Architect: George Aitchison
- Governing body: Kensington and Chelsea Borough Council

Listed Building – Grade II*
- Official name: Leighton House
- Designated: 30 August 1961
- Reference no.: 1191541

Leighton House is an historic house in the Holland Park area of the Royal Borough of Kensington and Chelsea in west London. The building was the home of wealthy Victorian painter, and President of the Royal Academy, Frederic Leighton (1830–1896), notable for the popular Flaming June painting. Leighton commissioned George Aitchison to build him a combined home and studio, to which later was added a qa'a (or "Arab Hall") which incorporated tiles and other elements purchased in the Near East during Leighton's travels. The resulting building, completed between 1866 and 1895 on the privately owned Ilchester Estate, is now Grade II* listed. It is noted for its elaborate Orientalist and aesthetic interiors, and is open to the public as both an historic house and an art museum.

== The house ==
The house has been open to the public since 1929. In 1958 the London County Council commemorated Leighton with a blue plaque. The museum was awarded the European Union Prize for Cultural Heritage / Europa Nostra Award in 2012. It is open daily except Tuesdays, and is a companion museum to 18 Stafford Terrace, another Victorian artist's home in Kensington.

== Design and construction ==
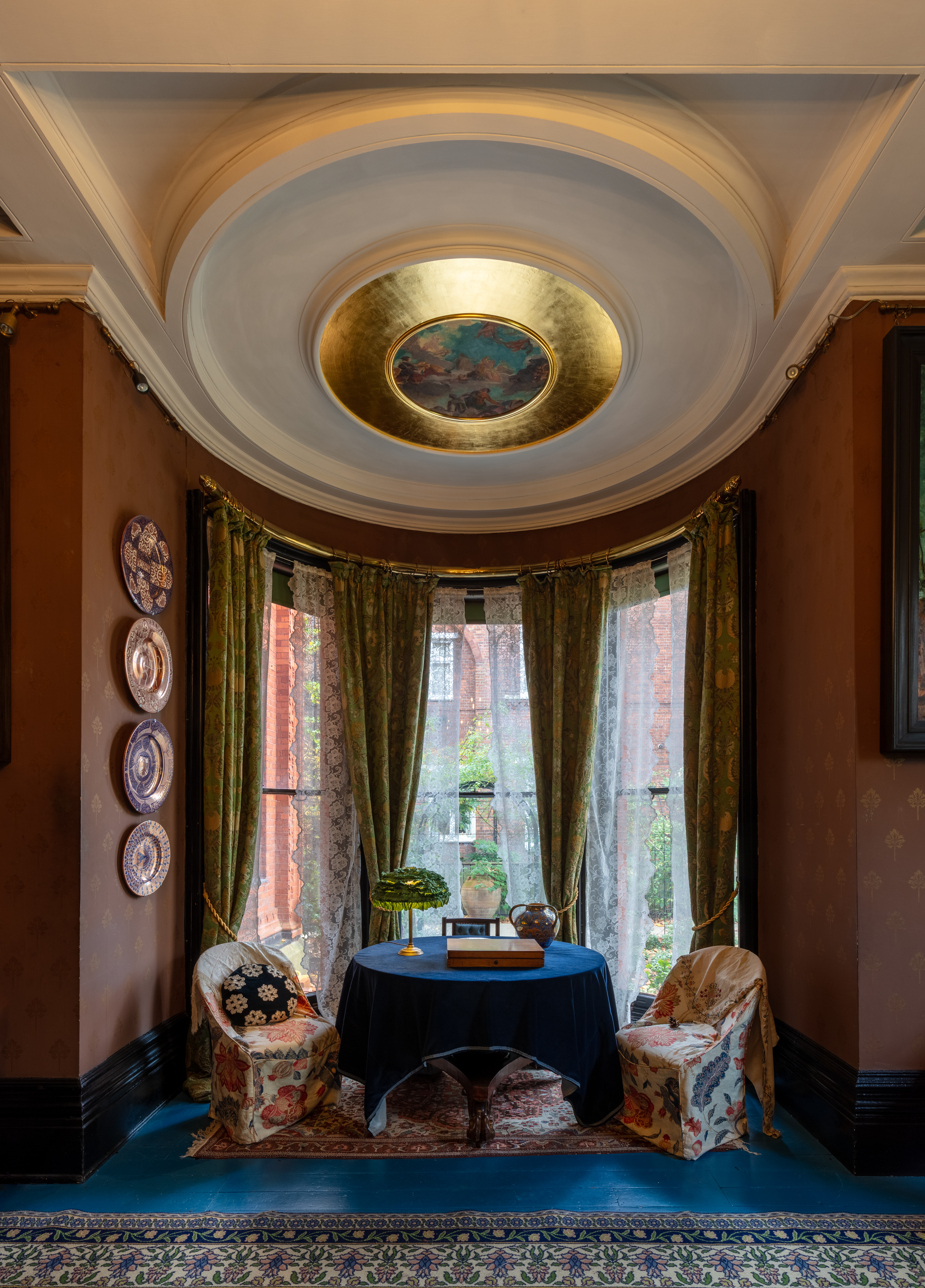
The Drawing Room

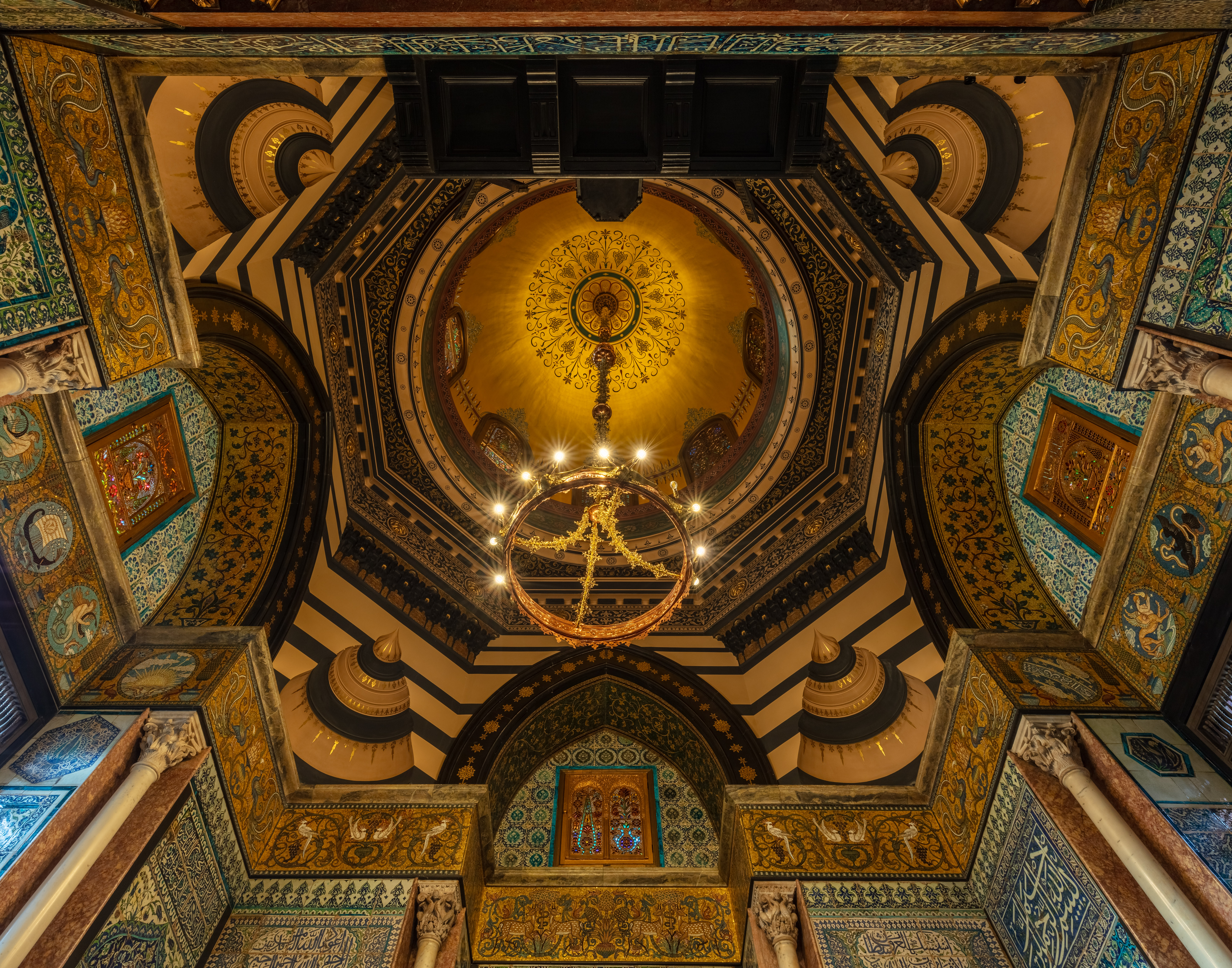
Ceiling of the Arab Hall

Aitchison designed the first part of the house (2 Holland Park Road, later renumbered as 12) in 1864, although Leighton was not granted a lease on the land until April 1866. Building commenced shortly afterwards, and the house, which cost £4500, equivalent to £494,334 in 2025, was ready for occupation by the end of the year. The building is of red Suffolk bricks with Caen Stone dressings in a restrained Classical style.

The architect extended the building over 30 years; the first phase was only three windows wide. The main room was the first-floor studio, facing north, originally 45 by 25 feet, with a large central window to provide plenty of light for painting. There was also a gallery at the east end and a separate staircase for use by models. The house was extended to the east in 1869–70. Additionally, a major extension was made in 1877–79: the two-storey "Arab Hall", built to house Leighton's collection of tiles collected during visits to the Middle East.

According to Aitchison and Walter Crane, the design was based on the palace of La Zisa in Palermo. The 17th-century tiles are complemented by carved wooden lattice-work windows of the same period from Damascus. There are also large 16th-century Turkish tiles. The west wall has a wooden alcove with inset 14th-century tiles.

The room also contains Victorian elements. The capitals of the smaller columns are by Sir Joseph Boehm, from Aitchison's designs. The capitals of the large columns, gilded and carved in the shape of birds, are by Randolph Caldecot. The mosaic frieze was designed by Walter Crane. The marble work was by George P. White. Elaborate decorative paintwork adorns the domed ceiling and in the centre of the floor is a small fountain. The tiles in the passage to the Arab Hall are by William De Morgan.

In 1889, an additional winter studio was added to the building. The final addition by Aitchison was the top-lit picture gallery in 1895. After Leighton died in 1896, the contents of the house were sold, including at least one thousand of his own drawings, almost all of which were bought by the Fine Art Society. In 1927 Mrs Henry Perrin offered to pay for additional gallery space. The building was extended to the designs of Halsey Ricardo and the Perrin Galleries opened in 1929. This extension was in memory of Mrs Perrin's daughter Muriel Ida Perrin, an artist and sculptor who had trained at the Royal College of Art and worked for the catalogue section of the Aircraft Manufacturing Company (Airco) during the First World War.

== Permanent collection ==
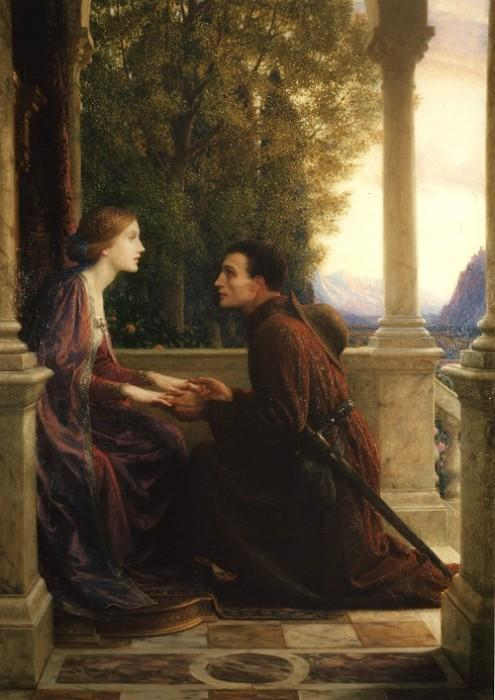
The End of the Quest (1921) by Frank Bernard Dicksee

The museum has on permanent display works of art by various members of the Pre-Raphaelite Brotherhood, including John Everett Millais, Edward Burne-Jones and George Frederic Watts, as well as 81 oil paintings by Leighton himself.

Some of the most notable oil paintings by Leighton in the collection are:

- The Death of Brunelleschi – 1852
- Charles Edward Perugini – 1855
- A Noble Lady of Venice – c. 1865
- Hercules Wrestling with Death for the Body of Alcestes – 1869–1871
- Clytemnestra from the Battlements of Argos Watches for the Beacon Fires Which Are to Announce the Return of Agamemnon – c. 1874
- Professor Giovanni Costa – 1878
- The Countess of Brownlow – c. 1878–79
- The Vestal – c. 1882–83
- Alexandra Sutherland Orr (née Leighton) – 1890
- And the sea gave up the dead which were in it – c. 1891–92

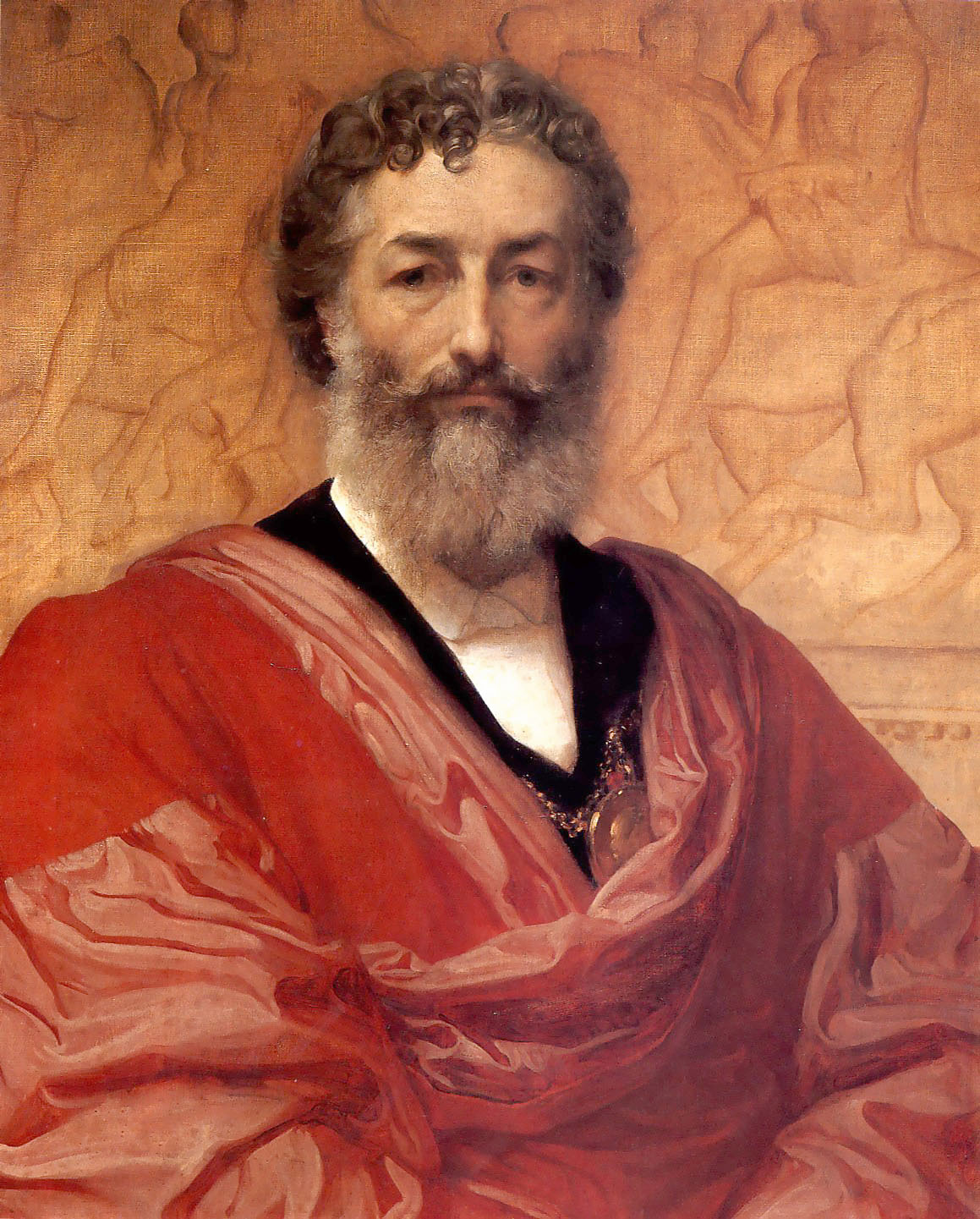
Self portrait of Leighton (1880)

Other works by Leighton in the collection include:

- 5 albums and sketchbooks of drawings and watercolours.
- 27 watercolours.
- 54 prints of Leighton's works.
- 14 items of personal material including documents, personal mementos, embroideries, enamels and caricatures.
- several small-scale sculptures, including Athlete Strangling a Python (1874) and Needless Alarms (1887).
- a portrait of Anna Risi

Works in the collection not by Leighton include:

- Antonio Rossellino's carved and coloured relief Madonna of the Candleabra, which had been in Leighton's collection, sold after his death and re-acquired by the museum in 2006.
- G. F. Watts's portrait of Frederic Leighton.
- Luke Fildes's still life and study for The Widower.
- Sir Alfred Gilbert's original sketch model for Eros.

In 2016 Leighton's famous painting Flaming June was loaned to the museum, and was displayed in the studio in which it was created.

=== Works in the permanent collection ===
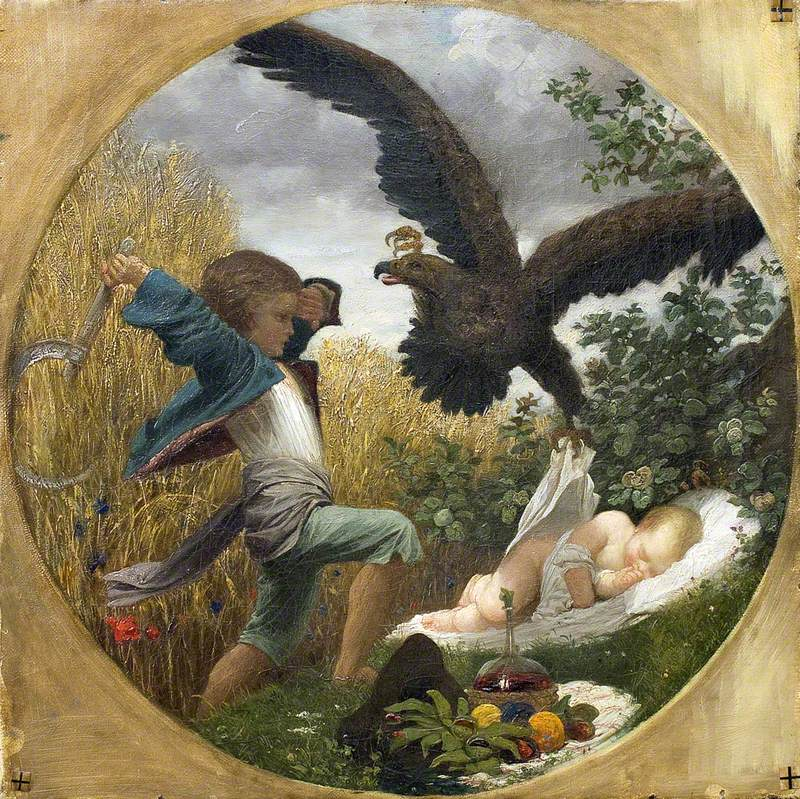
A Boy Defending a Baby from an Eagle, by Leighton, 1850–52, acquired by the museum prior to 1926

The Death of Brunelleschi, 1852

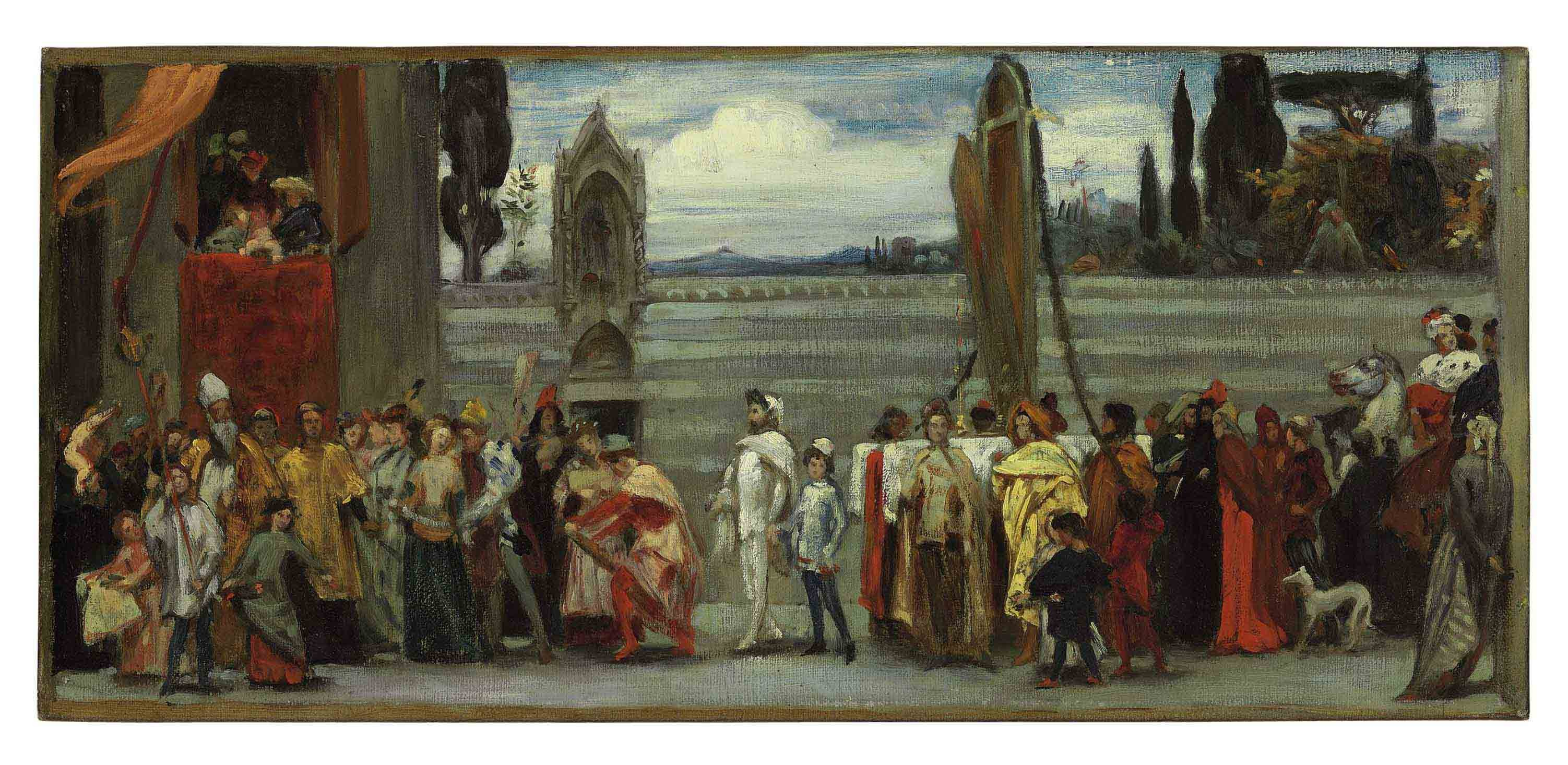
Oil Sketch for Cimabue's Celebrated Madonna, 1854, by Leighton, acquired by the museum 2011

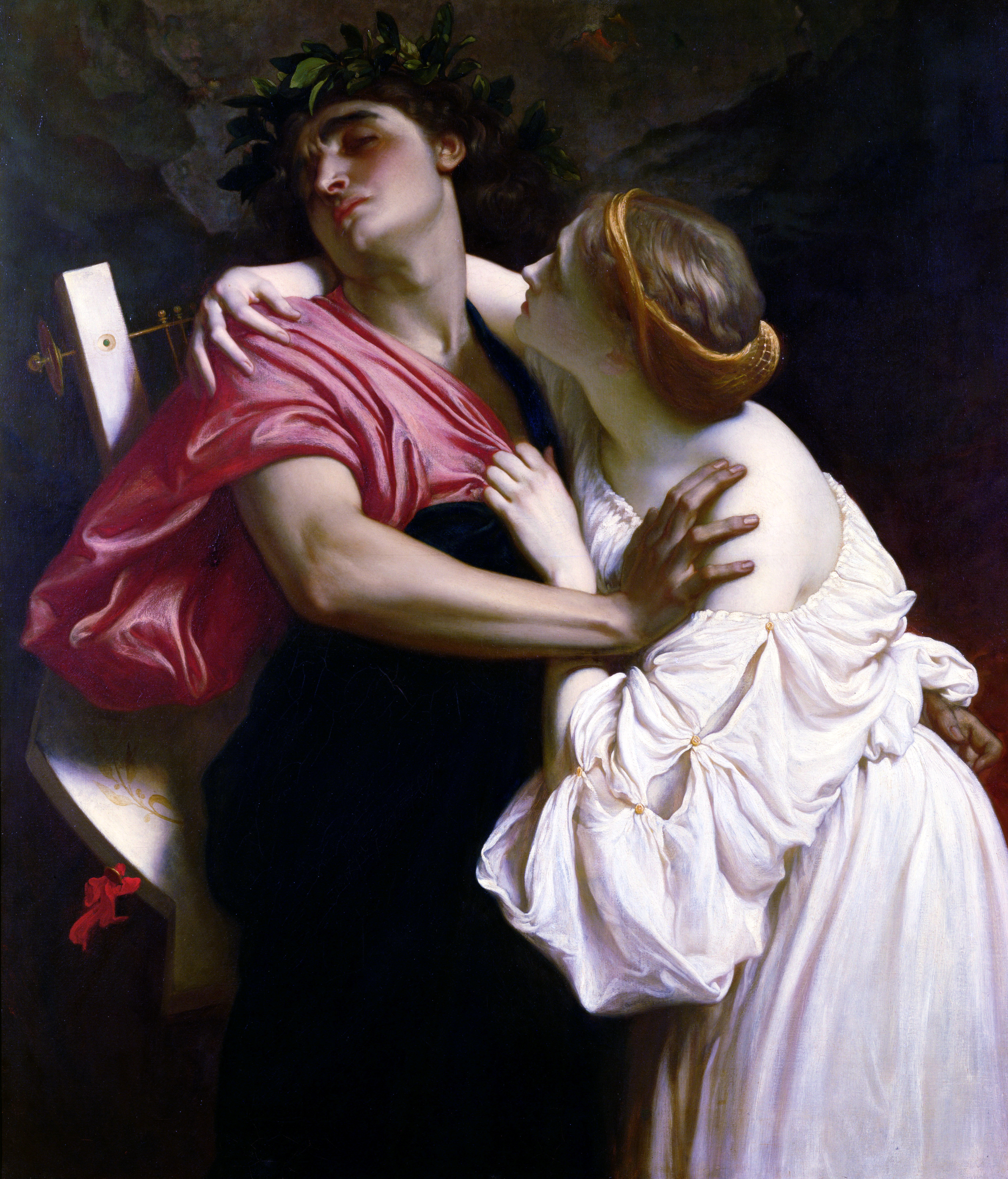
Orpheus & Eurydice, by Leighton, 1864, acquired by the museum 1960

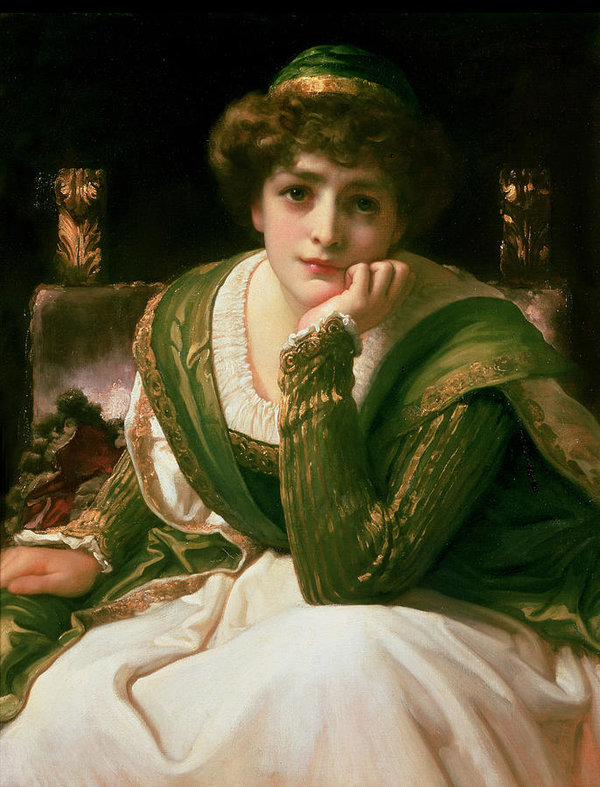
Study for Desdemona, by Leighton, c.1888, presented to the museum 1947

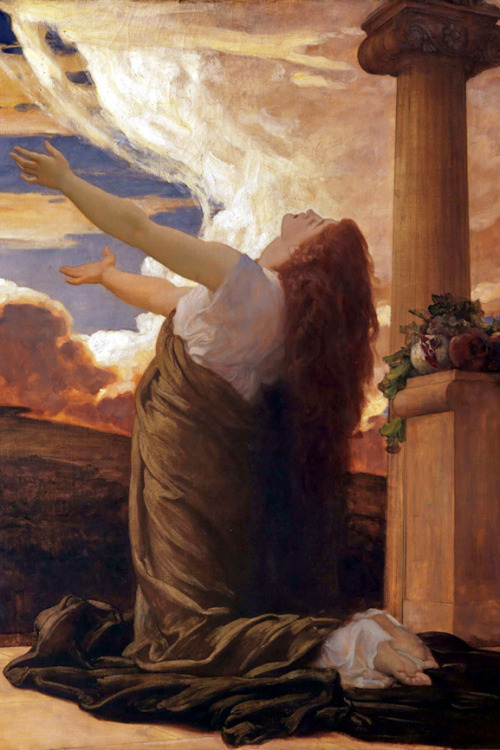
Clytie, by Leighton his final work, 1895–96, acquired by the museum 2008

== Council arts strategy ==
The building is run by Kensington and Chelsea Borough Council. In 2009 Nicholas Paget-Brown launched the Cultural Placemaking initiative as part of the council's Arts and Culture Policy. He explained that the plan was to build on the work of Opera Holland Park and Leighton House Museum to develop a broader coherent strategy to encourage developers to consider the council's creative and artistic ambitions when working on a development project.

A major £8 million refurbishment, including an updated new wing, based on 20th-century additions to the original house, opened on 15 October 2022. The wing includes additional exhibition spaces and displays, a café facing the restored garden, a learning centre, and a store for the collections. Step-free access throughout was also added. A new spiral staircase includes a circular mural "Oneness" by Shahrzad Ghaffari.

== In popular culture ==
The house's pseudo-Islamic court has featured as a set in various film and television programmes, such as Nicholas Nickleby (2002), Brazil (1985) and an episode of the drama series Spooks, as well as the music video for the songs "Golden Brown" by The Stranglers and "Gold" by Spandau Ballet.

== See also ==
- Holland Park Circle
- List of single-artist museums

== Sources ==
- Dakers, Caroline (1999). The Holland Park circle : artists and Victorian society. New Haven, Conn.: Yale University Press. ISBN 978-0-30008-164-0.
- Sheppard, F.H.W., ed. (1973). "The Holland estate: Since 1874". Northern Kensington (Survey of London, Volume XXXVII). London: Athlone Press on behalf of the Greater London Council.
