= Via Po =

Street in Turin, Italy

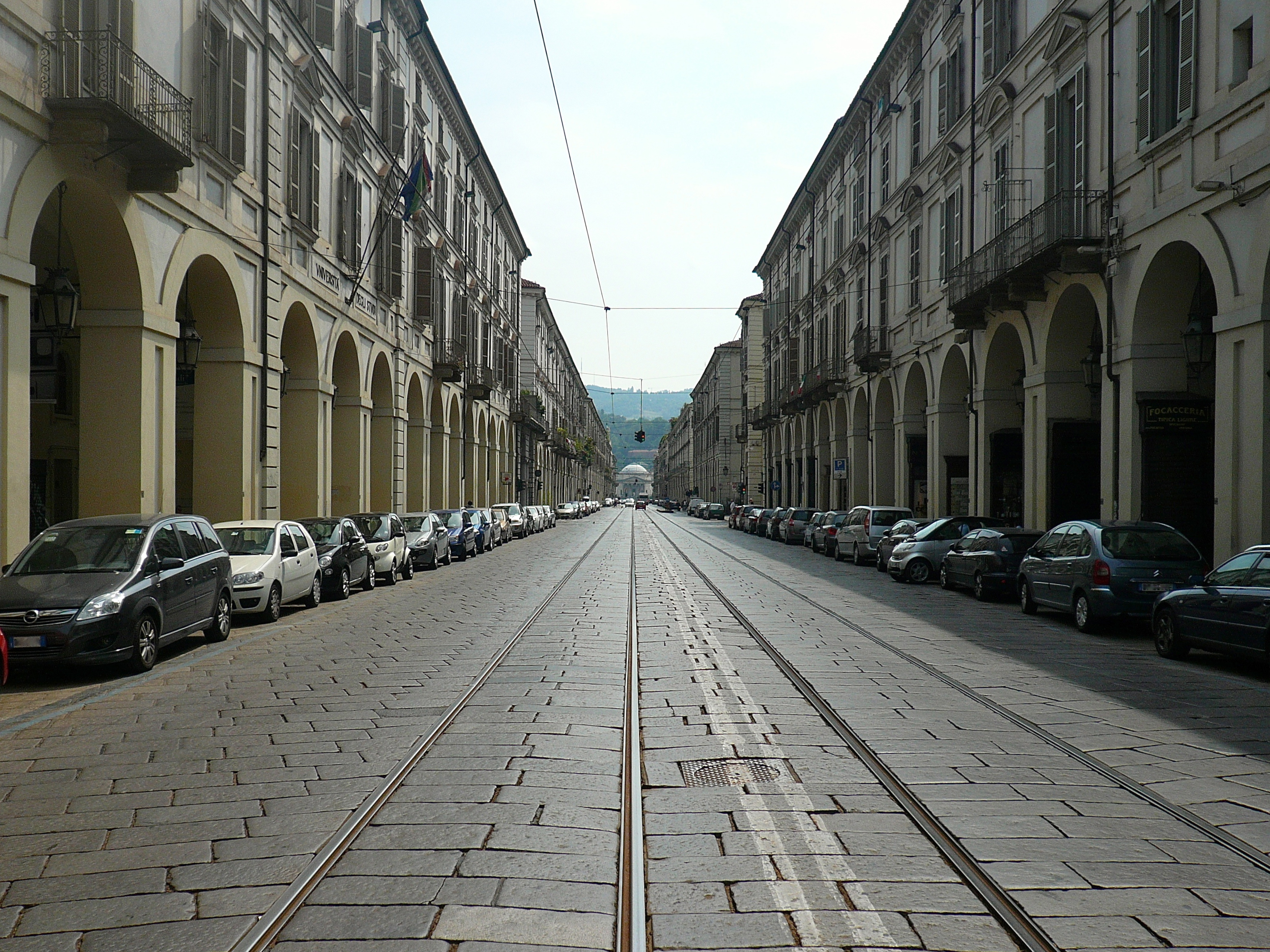
- Via Po in 2012
- Interactive map of Via Po
- Former names: Contrada di Po; Rue du Pô
- Namesake: River Po
- Type: Public
- Location: Turin, Italy
- Coordinates: 45°04′00.22″N 7°41′32.6″E

Via Po is a street and major monumental thoroughfare in Turin, Italy, connecting Piazza Castello to Piazza Vittorio Veneto. It is one of the city's main historic streets and is notable for its Baroque architecture and continuous arcades.

== History ==
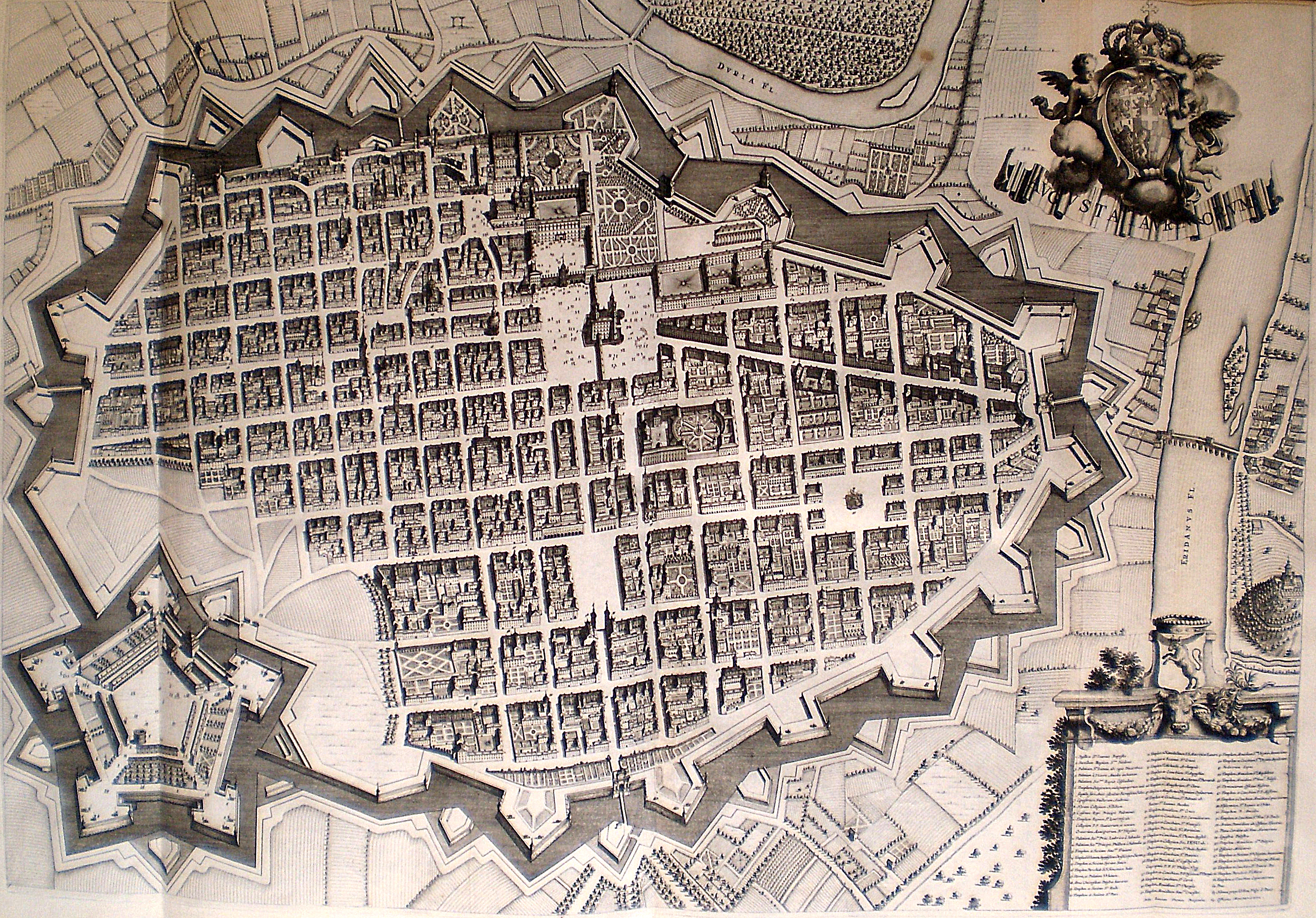
Late 17th century map of Turin. Via Po is the diagonal street on the right

Via Po was planned as the main axis of Turin's second urban expansion, initiated in 1673 under the House of Savoy. The project was developed under the supervision of architect Amedeo di Castellamonte and extended the city eastwards toward the River Po. The street followed a diagonal route, contrasting with the predominantly orthogonal layout of the surrounding historic centre which dated back to Roman times. The street façades were conceived with a unified Baroque design intended to convey a sense of monumentality.

Starting from 1819, covered passages and terraces were added along the northern side, uniting the arcades across the street crossings and creating a continuous sheltered route.

== Description ==
Via Po runs in a straight, gently descending line from Piazza Castello, located in the city centre, toward Piazza Vittorio Veneto, located on the Po riverfront. Its most distinctive feature is the system of continuous arcades, which forms a sheltered pedestrian corridor along both sides of the street. The façades feature a uniform Baroque design, with two main storeys of regularly spaced windows rising above arcades intended for commercial use.

The street forms a visual axis between Palazzo Madama at its western end and the Gran Madre di Dio across the Po at its eastern end.

Among the notable buildings located on the street are the Palazzo dell'Università, the churches of San Francesco da Paola and the Santissima Annunziata. The street's arcades cointain numerous historic shops and cafés, including Gioielleria Musy Padre e Figli, Libreria Antiquaria Bourlot and Caffè Fiorio.

== Gallery ==
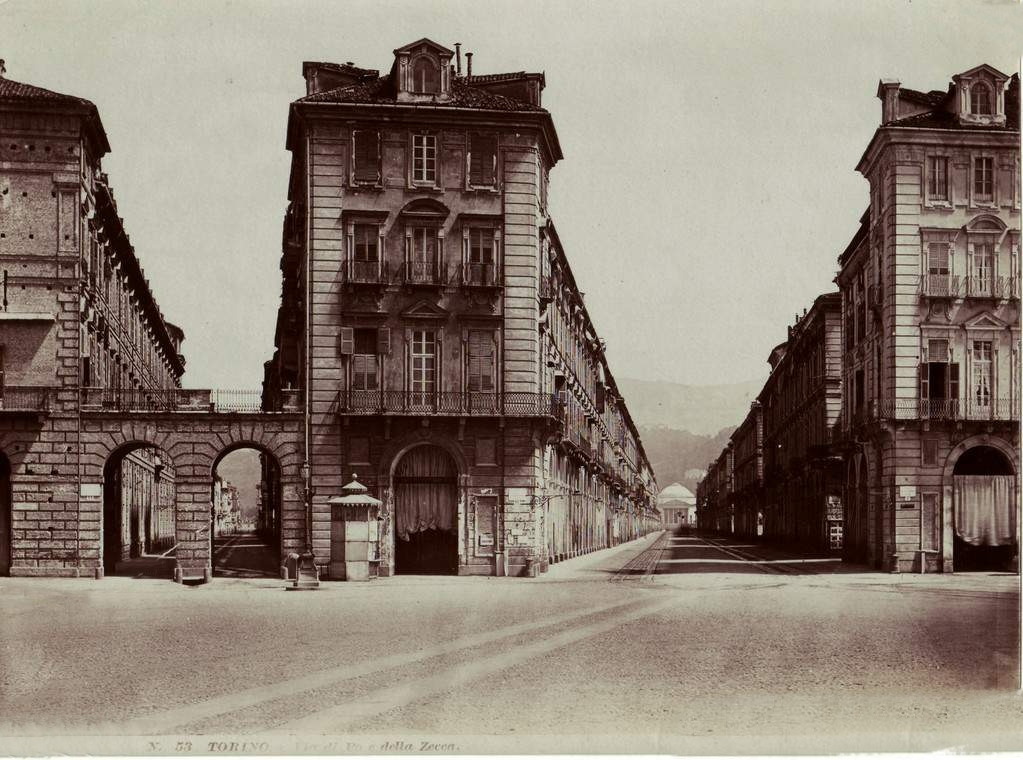
