= Tuomey =

Tuomey is a surname. Notable people with the surname include:

- John Tuomey (born 1954), Irish architect
- Michael Tuomey (geologist) (1805–1857), American geologist
- Michael Tuomey (politician) (1819–1887), American civil servant and politician

== See also ==
- O'Donnell & Tuomey, an architectural practice based in Dublin, Ireland
