= Ferdinando Bonsignore =

Italian architect and designer

Ferdinando Bonsignore (10 June 1760, in Turin – 27 June 1843, in Turin) was an Italian architect and designer.

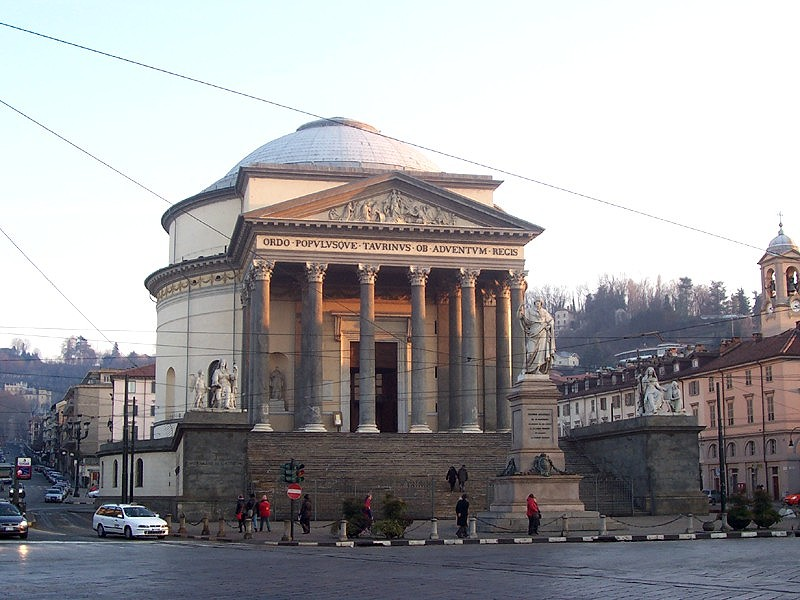
Façade of Gran Madre di Dio, Turin.

== Biography ==
He was a student of the Accademia di Pittura e Scultura di Torino in 1782, and from 1783 to 1798 he was given a scholarship to Rome by the King of Sardinia. In Rome he worked with Nicola Giansimoni (1727–1800), a neoclassic architect. In 1798, he returned to Turin and was nominated architect and designer to the court. He became professor of architecture in the Ecole spéciale d’architecture dell’Académie des Sciences, Littérature et Beaux Arts (1802–03) and at the university in 1805. In 1813 he received a gold medal for his design of a Monument to Napoleon on the Moncenisio. He kept his university position after the restoration, as well as numerous other awards and appointments. He helped design the church of Gran Madre di Dio in Turin. One of his pupils was Luigi Canina

Among his designs that were never realized were for an armory in Turin, a Palazzo dei Conservatori, an octagonal temple dedicated to the marquis Niccolò Puccini, and an Egyptian-style tomb for Michelangelo. Among his works by city are:

- Alessandria, modification of façade for city hall.
- Crescentino, façade for parish church.
- Florence, Hall of Palazzo Pitti, 1794–95; Design of a theater for a contest sponsored by the Academy of Florence, 1794.
- Naples, Church of San Francesco da Paola, never built.
- Porto Maurizio (Province of Imperia), Piazza 1809.
- Racconigi, Belvedere Tower and monument to the Battle of Trocadero in the park of Castello Reale, 1823.
- Romano Canavese, parish church never built. 1820.
- Strambino, parish church, Rosary Chapel.
- Vicoforte, Façade of Sanctuary 1825–1829 (along with work by Virginio Bordino).

== Works in Turin ==
- Civic Tower, Project, project, 1801
- Teatro Regio, reconstructions with Carlo Randoni, 1801
- Triumphal arch in Rroyal gardens, 1801
- Urban plan for Turin (con Michel Angelo Boyer e Lorenzo Lombardi), 1802
- Forni pubblici di Borgo Dora, 1802
- Arch in honor of Napoleon, 1805; Ponte sul Po, never built, 1805
- Palazzo dell’Università, Illumination for the Passage of Napoleone, 1808
- Piano d’abbellimento della città (con Giuseppe Cardone, Claude-Joseph La Ramée Pertinchamp, Lorenzo Lombardi, Carlo Randoni), 1809
- Padiglione with triumphal arch for Piazzetta Reale, 1814
- Palazzo di città, decoration of the stairs and hall of marbles, 1816–1825
- Urban plans for expansion (with Benedetto Brunati, Giuseppe Cardone, Lorenzo Lombardi e Ignazio Michelotti), 1817
- Ring of City walls, 1817
- Gran Madre di Dio, Turin, 1818–1831 with piazza in front.
- Via Po, collegamento of the north porticos, 1819
- Santa Cristina, main altar, 1819–1822 (removed)
- Piano regolatore di Porta Nuova (with L. Lombardi e C.Randoni), 1822–23
- Civic Tower, second project, 1822–1823
- San Lorenzo, Turin, strengthening cupola, 1823
- Palazzo Balbiano di Viale, 1823
- Palazzo of the Academy of Sciences, enlargement with Egyptian museum, project, 1824
- Teatro Carignano, internal design (with Fabrizio Sevesi), 1824
- Santissima Annunziata, Turin, study for the façade on via Po, 1824 (completed by Luigi Vigitello) (destroyed)
- Piazza Vittorio Emanuele I (now Vittorio Veneto), project (with B. Brunati, L. Lombardi, I. Michelotti, C. Randoni), completed independently by Giuseppe Frizzi (1824–25).
