= Bonsignore =

Bonsignore is a surname. Notable people with the surname include:

- Ferdinando Bonsignore (1760–1843), Italian architect and designer
- Gregory Bonsignore (born 1983), American playwright and screenwriter
- Jason Bonsignore (born 1976) American hockey player
- Justin Bonsignore (born 1988), American racing driver
- Lillian Bonsignore, former head of the EMS bureau of the New York City Fire Department
- Michael Bonsignore (born 1941), American business executive
- Vito Bonsignore (born 1943), Italian politician
