= V&A East =

Museum in Stratford, Greater London, England

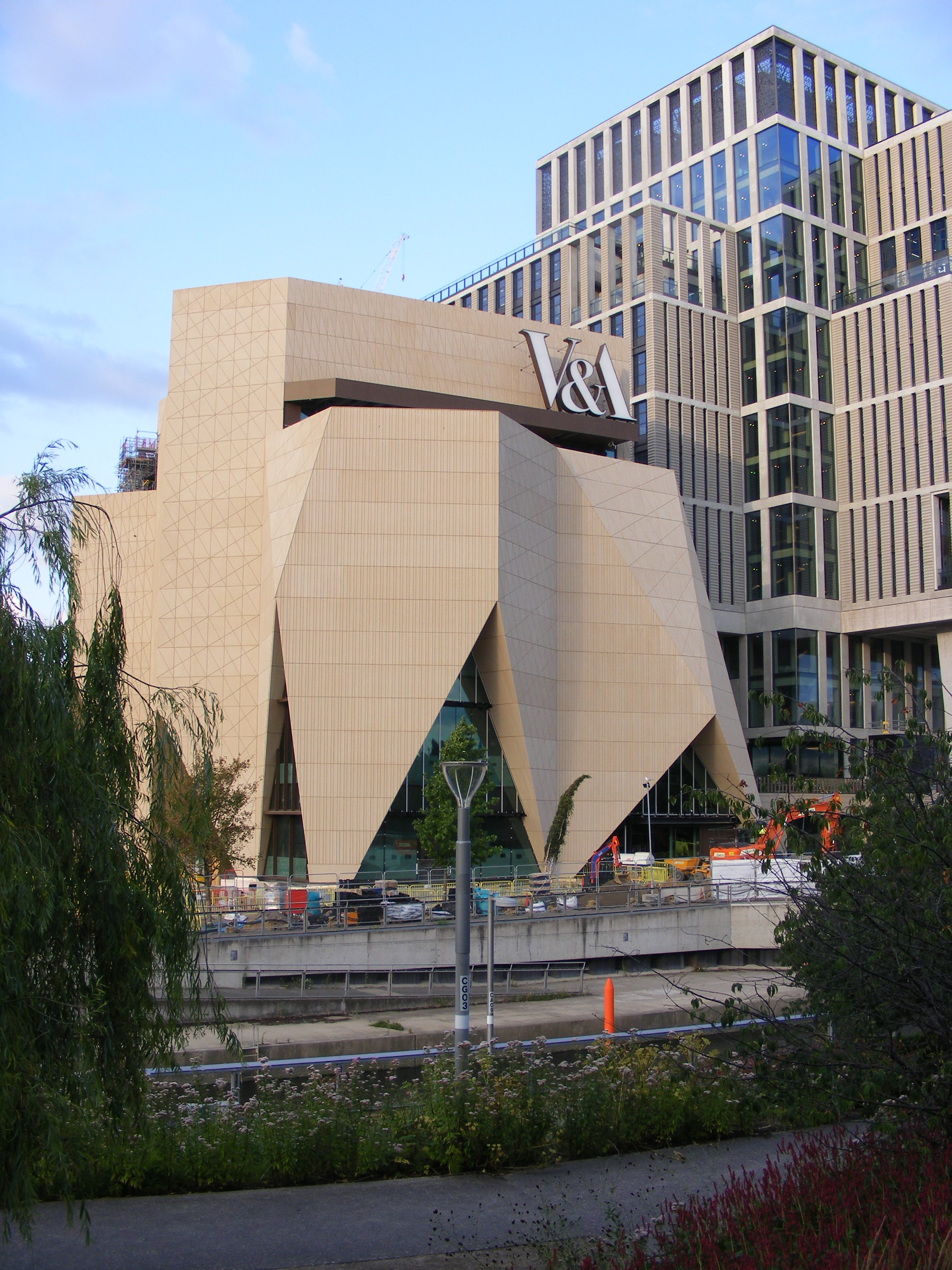
- V&A East Museum (pictured under construction in 2023)
- Established: 18 April 2026
- Location: Stratford, London
- Coordinates: 51°32′31″N 0°00′49″W
- Type: Design museum
- Director: Gus Casely-Hayford
- Architects: O'Donnell & Tuomey (Museum); Diller Scofidio + Renfro (Storehouse)
- Website: vam.ac.uk/east

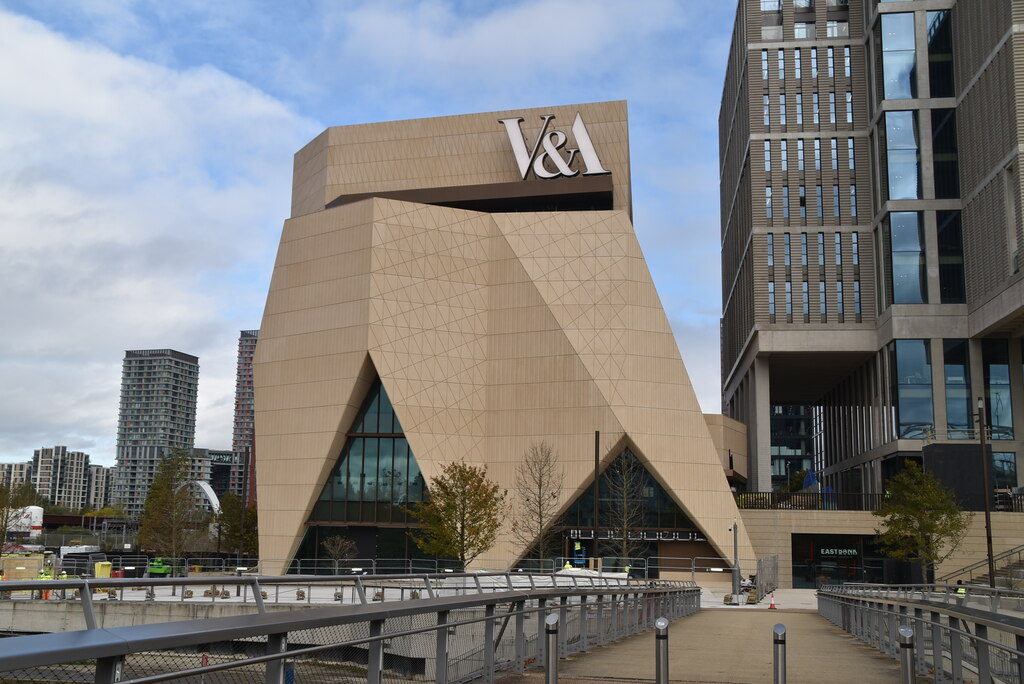
Another view (pictured in 2023)

V&A East (V&A East Museum and V&A East Storehouse) is a branch of the Victoria and Albert Museum, located in Stratford, London. V&A East forms part of East Bank, a cultural and education district located in Queen Elizabeth Olympic Park, which also includes BBC Music Studios, Sadler's Wells East, UAL's London College of Fashion, and UCL East.

The V&A East consists of two venues: the V&A East Museum and the V&A East Storehouse, which comprise two of the four London venues of the Victoria and Albert Museum – the others being the original South Kensington site and the Young V&A. The museum also has two other branches outside of London: one in Barlaston, Stoke-on-Trent; and another in Dundee, Scotland.

Gus Casely-Hayford is the director of the V&A East.

== History ==
The eastern outpost of the V&A was originally conceived in 2016 as part of the legacy plans for the 2012 London Olympics, and was around a decade in the making. V&A East forms part of East Bank, the cultural and education quarter developed in Queen Elizabeth Olympic Park in Stratford, and sits alongside venues for the BBC, Sadler's Wells East and the London College of Fashion. The parent Victoria and Albert Museum, whose collections supply the site's displays, was founded on Pall Mall in 1852 and moved to South Kensington in 1857. V&A East comprises two venues: the V&A East Storehouse and the V&A East Museum.

=== V&A East Storehouse ===
The first venue to open was the V&A East Storehouse, a publicly accessible collections and research building operating on a "working museum" model, which opened in May 2025 and had attracted more than 500,000 visitors within its first year. It was designed by American studio Diller Scofidio + Renfro.

On 10 June 2025, Catherine, Princess of Wales, who had become the V&A's first royal patron in 2018, toured the Storehouse, where she was shown the collections by the museum's curatorial team and its director, Tristram Hunt, and learned about the site's "Order an Object" service. Following the visit, Catherine curated a "mini display" titled Makers and Creators, selecting nine objects from the V&A's collections in collaboration with the curatorial team to illustrate how historic works can influence contemporary creativity. The display was announced by Kensington Palace and unveiled at the museum on 30 July 2025; in an accompanying statement, Catherine wrote that "objects can tell a story" and that a collection could "create a narrative, both about our past and as inspiration for the future". The nine objects were a costume designed by Oliver Messel and worn by Diana Vere as the Fairy of the Woodland Glades in The Royal Ballet's 1960 production of The Sleeping Beauty; a watercolour of a forest glade by the children's author Beatrix Potter, creator of Peter Rabbit; a photograph album belonging to her father, Rupert Potter; a 15th-century earthenware tile from South Cadbury Church in Somerset; a Morris & Co. furnishing screen designed by William Morris's assistant John Henry Dearle; a hand-quilted bedcover made in Wales around 1830–40; an oil painting, A woman holding a marguerite, by the Anglo-American artist George Henry Boughton; a Qing dynasty porcelain vase made at Jingdezhen between 1662 and 1722; and a sculpture of her own hands by the novelist and playwright Clemence Dane. The display ran from July 2025 until early 2026, viewable as part of the Storehouse's free self-guided "Order an Object" experience.

The V&A East Storehouse houses the David Bowie Centre, the home of David Bowie's archive of more than 90,000 objects, including sketches, writings, costumes, instruments and material relating to unrealised projects. Alongside the archive, the centre houses rotating displays, a study centre, a learning zone and a research library. It was designed by the studio Fieldwork Facility, with a design intended to reflect Bowie's stagecraft through the use of iridescent and reflective materials. Features include a rail of Bowie's costumes, an interactive "Library of Connections" exploring different periods of his work, and twelve curated displays. In June 2026, the V&A announced David Bowie: On Tour, the first national tour of highlights from the archive. More than 100 objects, some not previously displayed, were arranged into four sections: Bowie Through a Lens, All the Somebody People, Hooked to the Silver Screen, and I Can't Give Everything Away. The tour was scheduled to open at V&A Dundee in November 2026, followed by Showtown in Blackpool, the Bowes Museum in County Durham, the Ferens Art Gallery in Hull, and Bristol Museum and Art Gallery, running into 2028. The V&A had first exhibited Bowie's archive in a separate touring exhibition between 2013 and 2018.

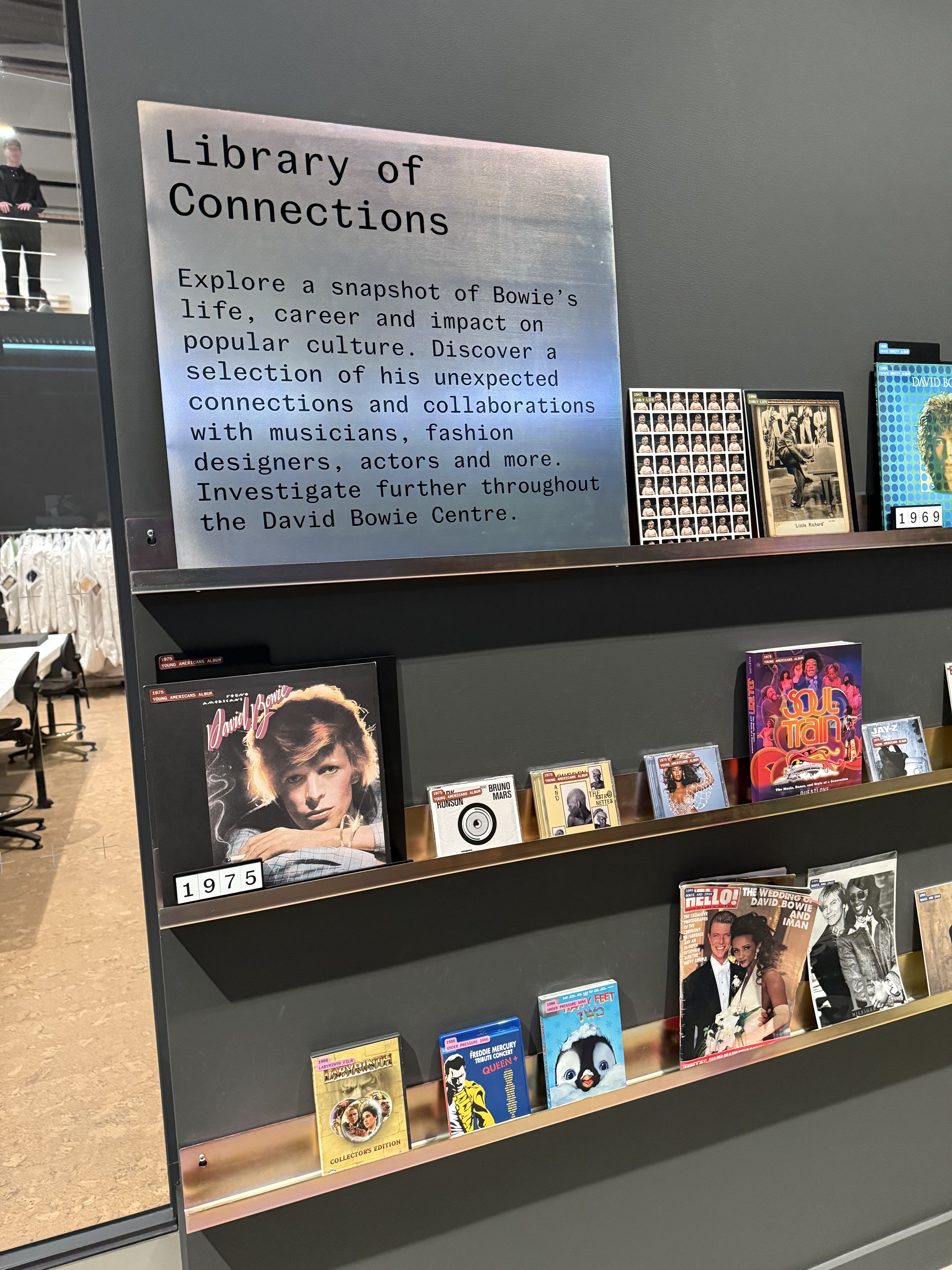
David Bowie Centre entrance display (2025)

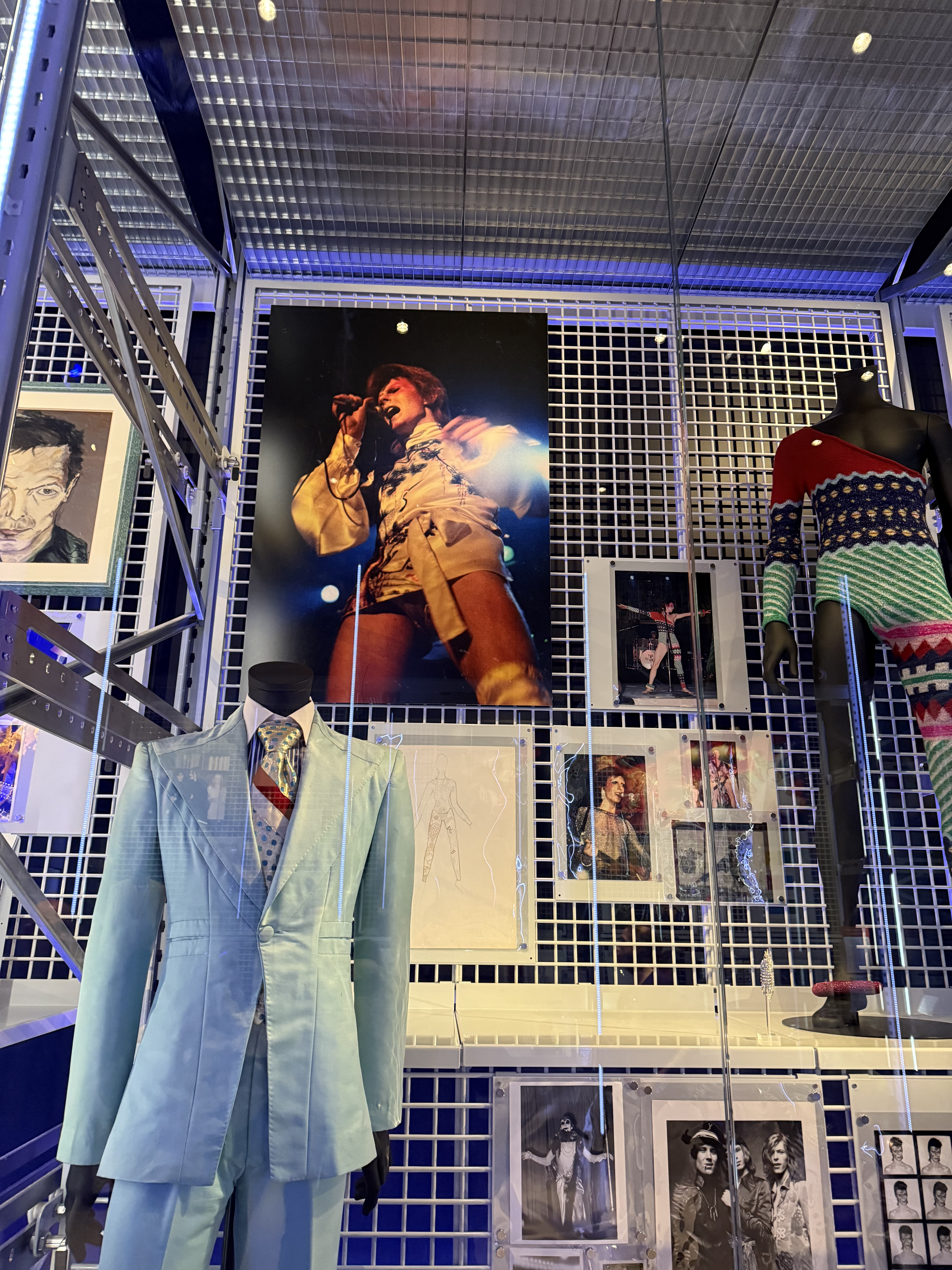
Outfits worn by Bowie on display (2025)

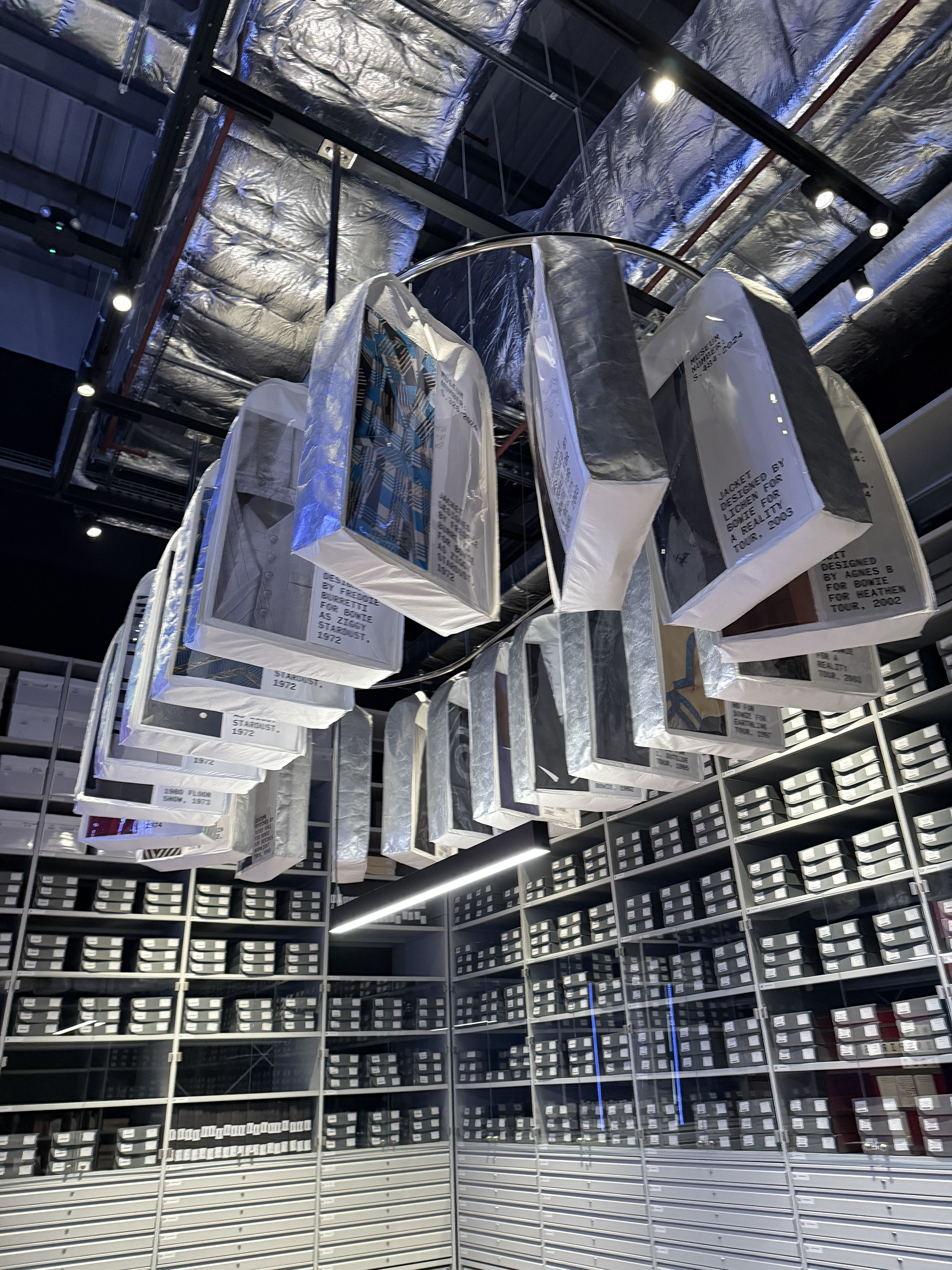
Rail of Bowie's costumes (2025)

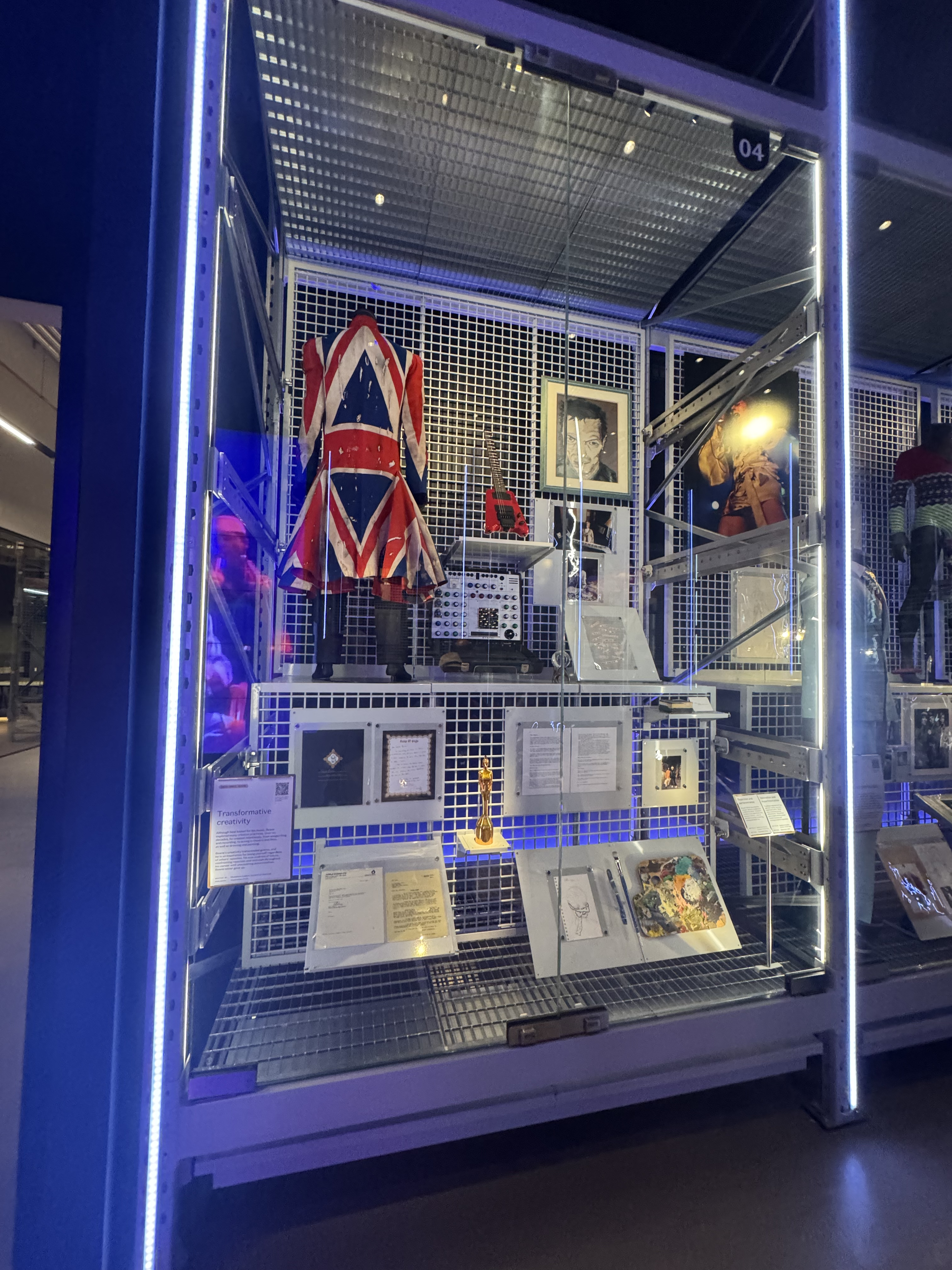
Bowie's memorabilia and a Brit Award (2025)

In April 2026, the V&A East Storehouse was named one of five finalists for the Art Fund Museum of the Year 2026, alongside the National Gallery, the Box in Plymouth (the eventual winner), the Fitzwilliam Museum in Cambridge and Norwich Castle Museum & Art Gallery. The winner receives £120,000, and each of the other finalists receives £20,000. The winner was announced on 25 June 2026 at a ceremony at the Cutty Sark in London.

=== V&A East Museum ===
A preview event was held at Queen Elizabeth Olympic Park on Tuesday 14 April 2026, bringing together cultural and creative figures to mark the unveiling of the museum. Guests included Dame Prue Leith, Vick Hope, Amelia Dimoldenberg, Archie Madekwe, Nathalie Emmanuel, Sheila Atim and the Mayor of London, Sadiq Khan. The museum opened to the public on Saturday 18 April 2026 as the V&A's sixth site. It was designed by the Irish architectural firm O'Donnell & Tuomey. Entry to the permanent galleries is free, with a separate charge for temporary exhibitions.

The five-storey museum opened with two permanent "Why We Make" galleries, featuring more than 500 objects drawn from the V&A's collections and spanning art, architecture, design, performance and fashion across centuries and cultures. The two permanent "Why We Make" galleries display a rotating selection of design, art, fashion and craft from the V&A's collections, arranged by theme. Objects on display at opening included a 2023 Walthamstow Football Club shirt based on an 1892 Morris & Co. pattern, Althea McNish's 1959 Golden Harvest furnishing fabric, Maud Sulter's 1989 photographic portrait of Lubaina Himid, Yinka Ilori's 2015 Captain Hook armchair, a 1744 gown using silk designed by Anna Maria Garthwaite, and a ceramic work by Bisila Noha.

Its inaugural temporary exhibition, The Music Is Black: A British Story (18 April 2026 – 3 January 2027), curated by Jacqueline Springer, charted around 125 years of Black music-making in Britain and its influence on wider British culture. Featuring more than 220 objects, including photographs, paintings, prints and stage outfits, the exhibition examined how British colonialism and migration shaped the cross-cultural development of modern music, and how styles originating in Black British music were taken up by other artists. It spanned genres including jazz, reggae, lovers rock, blues, Afrobeats, grime and UK garage, and featured figures ranging from Janet Kay, Dame Shirley Bassey and Steel Pulse to contemporary artists such as Little Simz and Sampha.

The museum also launched New Work, a rolling six-month commissions programme featuring artists including Tania Bruguera, Carrie Mae Weems and Rene Matić, while an 18-foot (5.5 m) bronze sculpture by Thomas J. Price, A Place Beyond (2026), was installed to greet visitors at the entrance. Bruguera's contribution, a stained-glass window titled Towards a Civic Museum, was developed in consultation with the V&A East Youth Collective and depicts the four boroughs bordering the museum's site alongside a set of aspirations for the institution. The museum was developed with input from young people and according to Gus Casely-Hayford, the museum's director, more than 30,000 were consulted on aspects of its presentation and operation, and he visited 100 secondary schools during the process. Casely-Hayford described the project as offering "a fresh look at contemporary culture" through the V&A's global collections.

According to figures from the Greater London Authority, the total cost of V&A East was £115 million.

=== Catalogue censorship controversy ===
Around the time of the opening, it was reported that the V&A had agreed to remove or alter images in at least two recent exhibition catalogues following demands from its China-based printer, C&C Offset Printing, acting on standards set by Beijing's General Administration of Press and Publication. The affected material included a 1930s illustration of British imperial trade routes, featuring a map of China, that had been intended for the Music Is Black catalogue, and an image of Vladimir Lenin in an earlier Fabergé publication; the museum characterised the alterations as minor edits that did not affect the narrative.

== Architecture and characteristics ==
=== V&A East Storehouse ===
The V&A East Storehouse houses over 250,000 artefacts, 350,000 books, and 1,000 archives in a four-level complex with 16,000 square meters of floorspace. The Storehouse includes the David Bowie Centre, which features a series of rotating displays and installations relating to the English musician. The Storehouse introduces a new model of museum access, allowing visitors to request and view stored objects through an "order an object" system.

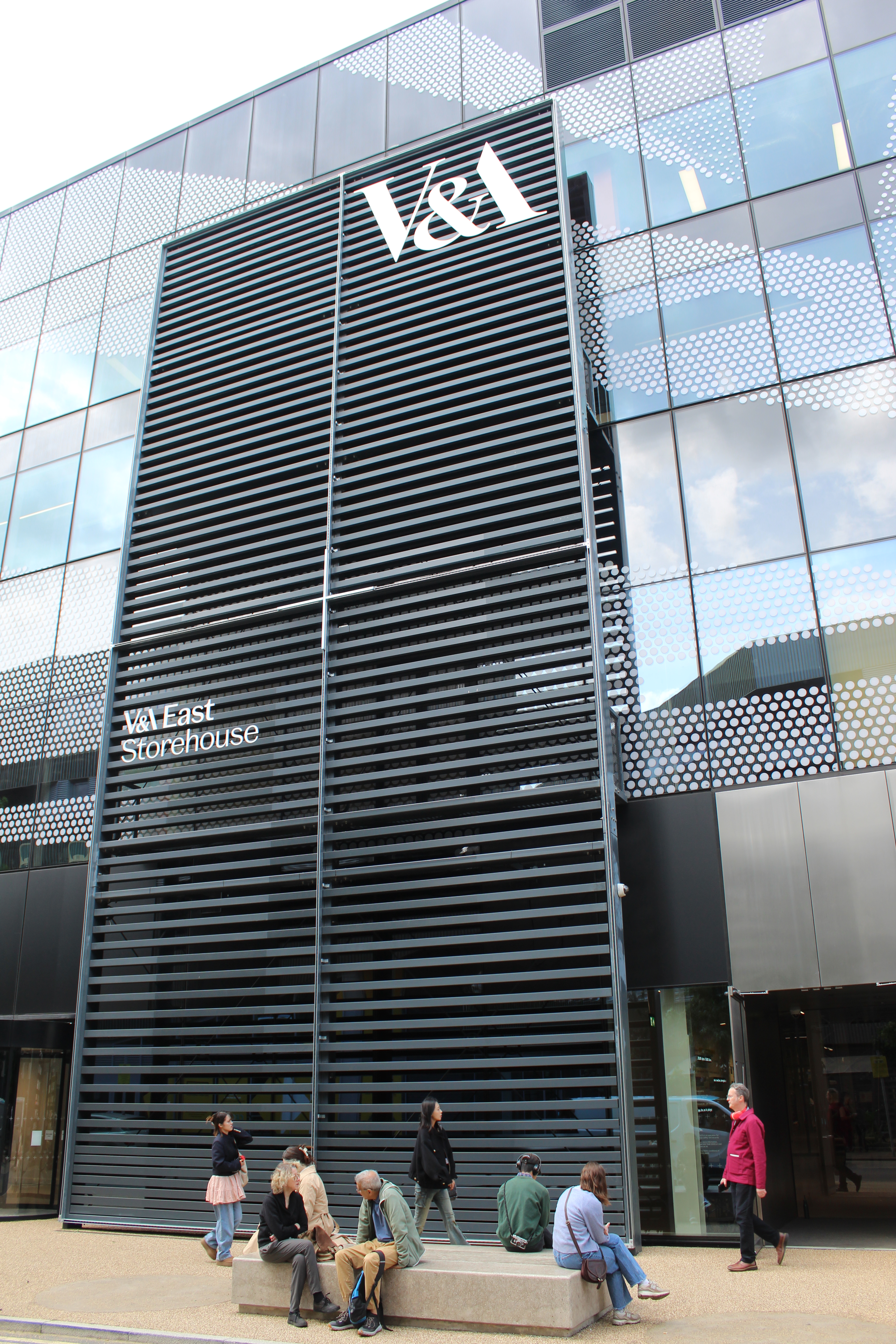
Storehouse entrance

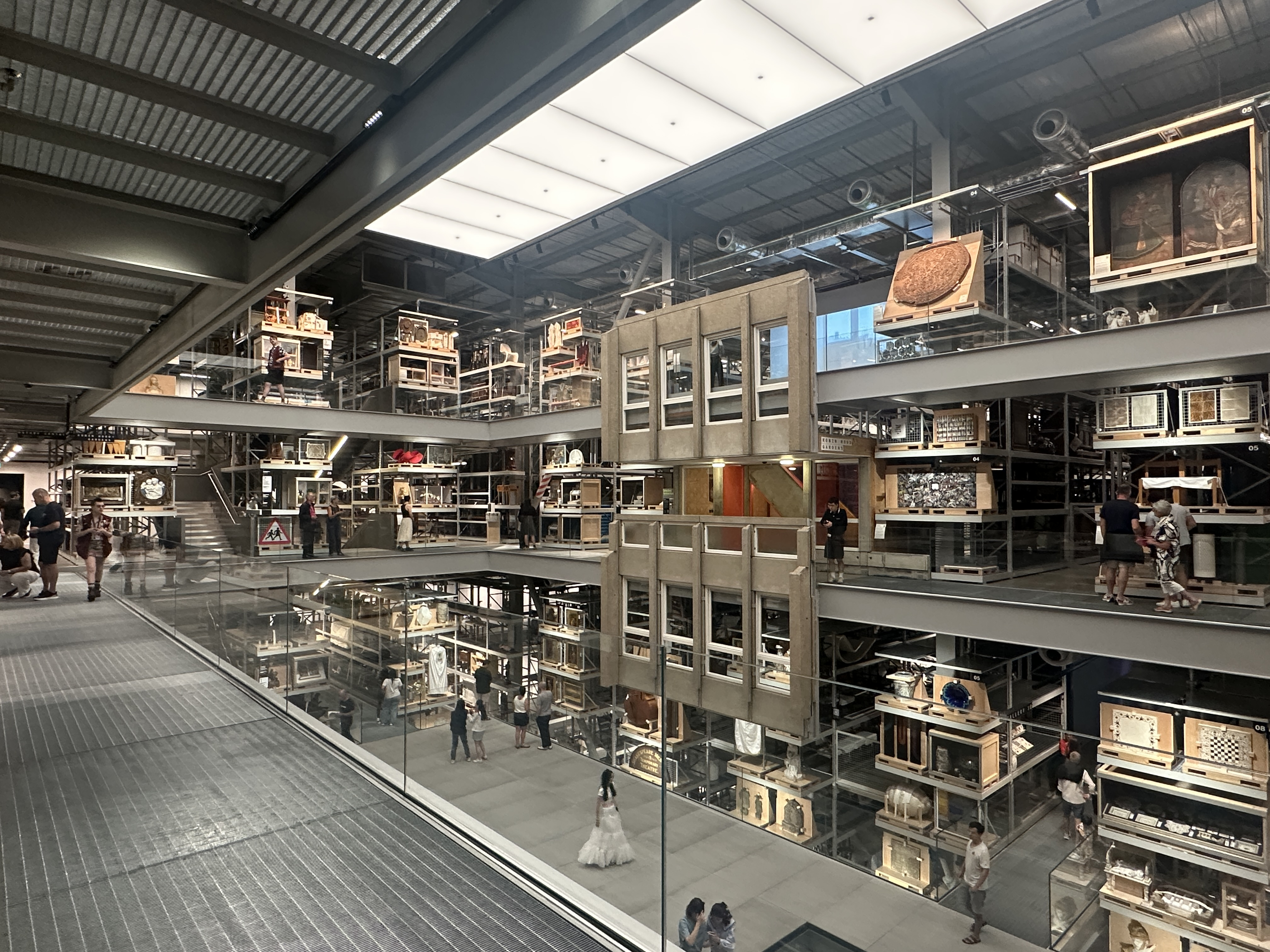
Storehouse interior

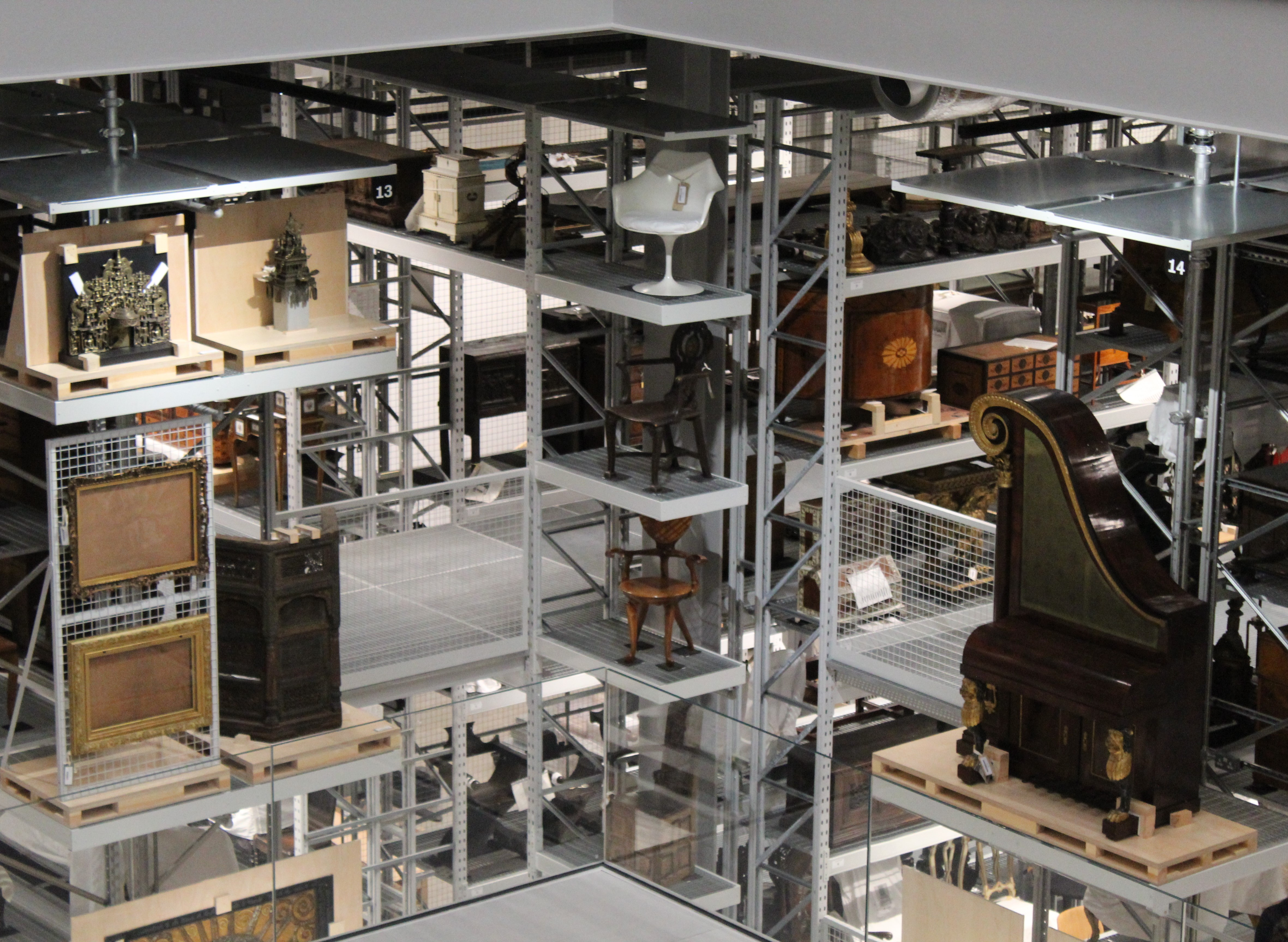
Storage racking detail

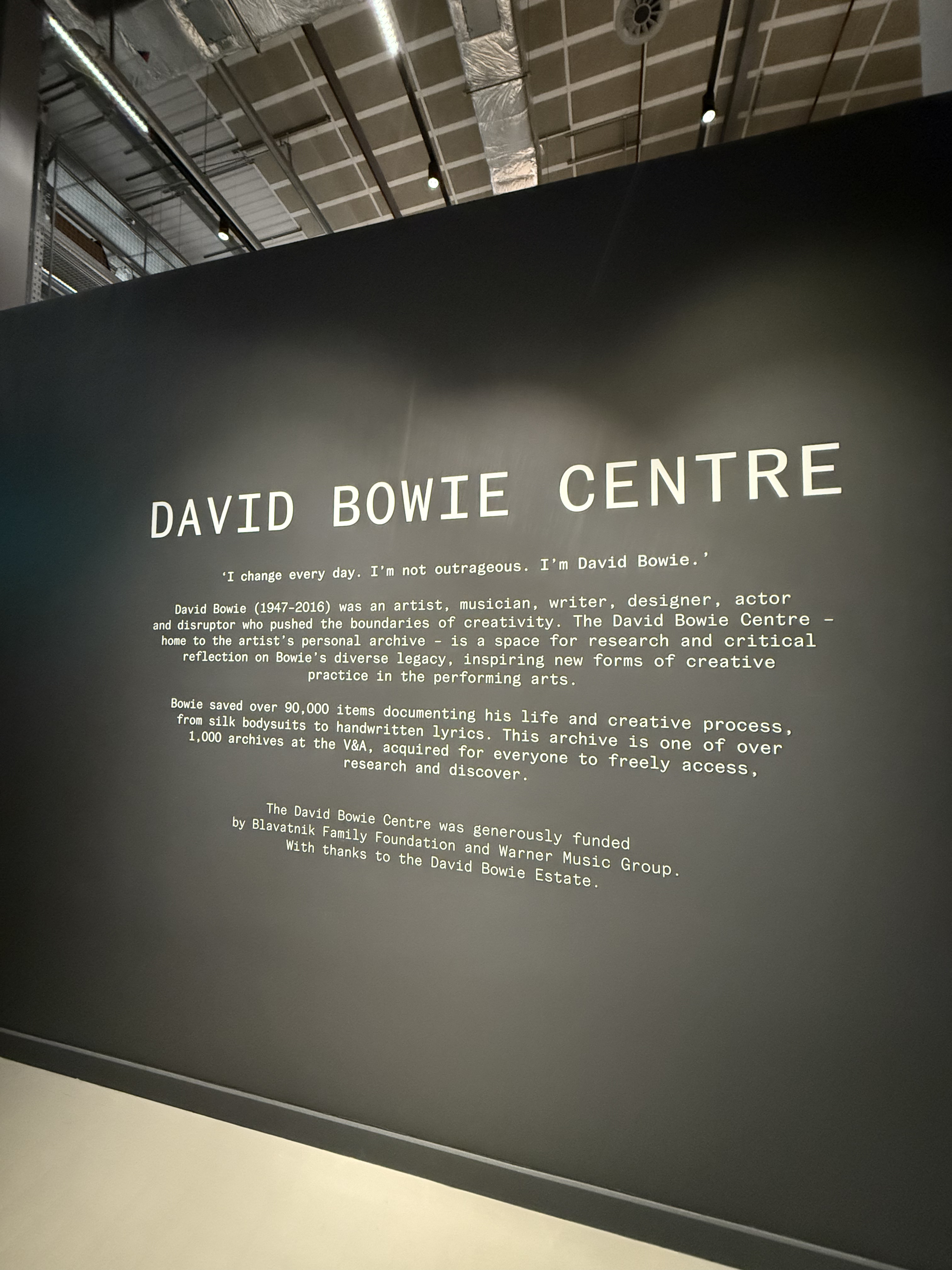
Entrance to the David Bowie Centre (2025)

=== V&A East Museum ===
The V&A East Museum is a five-storey building designed by the Dublin-based practice O'Donnell + Tuomey, founded by John Tuomey and Sheila O'Donnell. It stands on a riverfront site in the Queen Elizabeth Olympic Park.

Its exterior consists of a folded, faceted façade made from 479 uniquely shaped precast concrete panels, pigmented a sand or honey colour rather than left grey. According to Tuomey, the panels are scored with profiles referencing the V&A's logo, with the linework aligned across the folded surface so that it catches changing daylight over the course of the day. The panels were cast to tight tolerances and assembled around a steel structure. The architects have said the folded form developed from studies of fabric and drapery, referencing a sleeve in a Vermeer painting and the tailoring of couturier Cristóbal Balenciaga, as well as the Japanese concept of ma; they conceived the building as a protective outer shell wrapping an internal core, with the space between façade and structure forming the circulation routes that guide visitors upwards.

Inside, the building contains two permanent galleries, a temporary exhibition gallery of about 900 m^{2} (9,700 sq ft), a top-floor project and event space, learning facilities, a café and a shop. The circulation route is carved from the thickness of the external walls, and windows along it, together with three public terraces, bring in daylight and views across the Olympic Park and the surrounding East Bank district. The interior galleries are finished as plain white spaces with terrazzo floors, intended as a calm backdrop that does not compete with the objects, art commissions and live events on display.
