= George Aitchison =

British architect and academic (1825–1910)

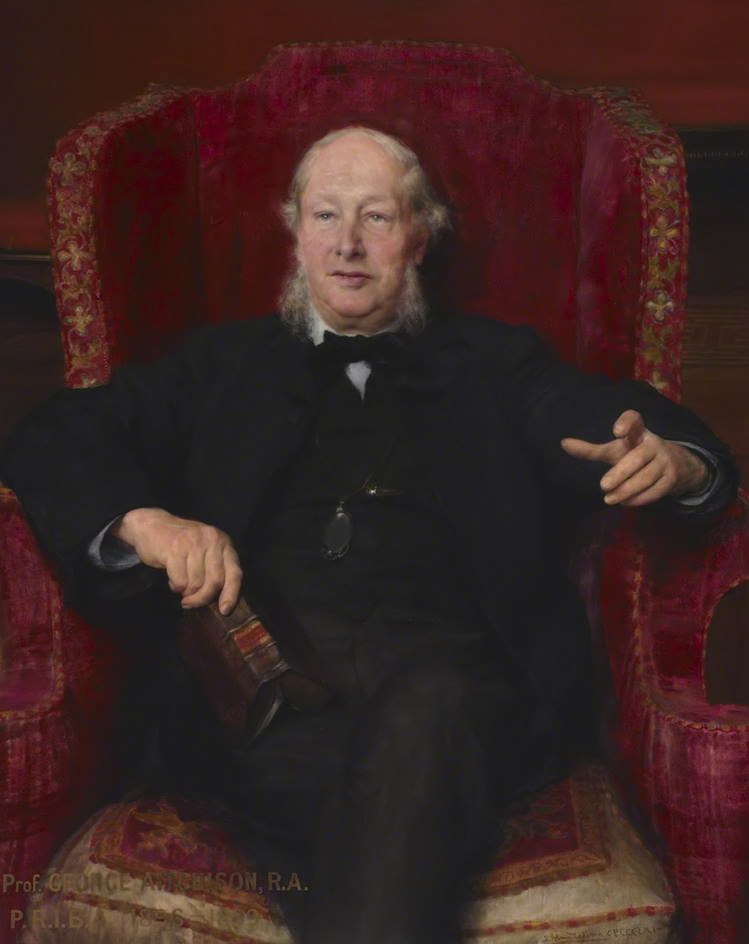
Professor George Aitchison (Lawrence Alma-Tadema, 1900)

George Aitchison Jr. RA (London 7 November 1825 – 16 May 1910) was a British architect and academic of "considerable reputation".

He was the son of architect, civil engineer, and surveyor George Aitchison (1792–1861), and educated at Merchant Taylors' School then University College London, obtaining a first class Bachelor of Arts degree (with honours in animal physiology (Note: All B.A. students were tested in four subjects (mathematics and natural philosophy, animal physiology, classics, and logic and moral philosophy) and could sit an additional honours examination.)) in 1850.

His best-known work is Leighton House in Kensington, described by architectural historian J. Mordaunt Crook as "one of the most innovative houses of the Victorian period", which he designed for his friend, the artist Frederic Leighton. This generated a number of commissions from well-heeled clients and "established him as a master of decoration and ornament". Moncure D. Conway considered the house of Frederick Lehman in Berkeley Square to be Aitchison's "chef-d'œuvre", noting that the rooms he completed "would fein see themselves hung upon the walls of the Royal Academy, and not merely the designs of some of them, which were, indeed exhibited there".

Aitchison became an associate member of the Royal Academy of Arts in 1881 and a full member in 1898, (Note: The diploma work Aitchison submitted was for the design of the Royal Exchange Assurance building, Pall Mall.) and was Professor of Architecture there from 1887 to 1905. He was elected a fellow of the Royal Institute of British Architects in 1862, and after serving as its vice-president from 1889 to 1893, succeeded Francis Penrose as president from 1896 to 1899. He was awarded their Royal Gold Medal in 1898.

== Publications ==
- Aitchison, George (1878). "Restoration of Ancient Buildings". Transactions of the National Association for the Promotion of Social Science, 1877. London: Longmans, Green and Co. pp. 712–720, 726 – via HathiTrust.
- Aitchison, George (1883). "Address on Art". Transactions of the National Association for the Promotion of Social Science, 1882. London: Longmans, Green and Co. pp. 111–123 – via HathiTrust.
- Aitchison, George (27 February 1886). "Architectural Education". The Builder. Vol. 50, no. 2247. pp. 331–334, 351 – via Internet Archive.
- Aitchison, George (6 March 1886). "Mouldings". The Builder. Vol. 50, no. 2248. pp. 365–366 – via Internet Archive.
- Aitchison, George (13 March 1886). "Mouldings". The Builder. Vol. 50, no. 2249. pp. 402–404 – via Internet Archive.
- Aitchison, George (15 December 1888). "Utilitarian Ugliness in Towns". The Builder. Vol. 55, no. 2393. pp. 430–433 – via HathiTrust.
- Aitchison, George (2 February 1889). "Roman Architecture". The Builder. Vol. 56, no. 2400. pp. 85–88 – via HathiTrust.
- Aitchison, George (9 February 1889). "Roman Thermæ: The Baths at Caracalla". The Builder. Vol. 56, no. 2401. pp. 103–106 – via HathiTrust.
- Aitchison, George (16 February 1889). "The Thermæ at Caracalla (Continued)". The Builder. Vol. 56, no. 2402. pp. 121–124 – via HathiTrust.
- Aitchison, George (23 February 1889). "The Roman Thermæ". The Builder. Vol. 56, no. 2403. pp. 142–125 – via HathiTrust.
- Aitchison, George (2 March 1889). "Decorative Materials". The Builder. Vol. 56, no. 2404. pp. 162–165 – via HathiTrust.
- Aitchison, George (9 March 1889). "The Principal Marbles Used By the Romans: An Appendix to the Fifth Royal Academy Lecture". The Builder. Vol. 56, no. 2405. pp. 181–183 – via HathiTrust.
- Aitchison, George (16 March 1889). "Construction". The Builder. Vol. 56, no. 2406. pp. 198–201 – via HathiTrust.
- Aitchison, G. (January 1891). "The Principles of Decoration". Popular Science Monthly. Vol. 38. pp. 390–398 – via Internet Archive.
- Aitchison, G. (1892). "Byzantine Architecture". Transactions of the Royal Institute of British Architects. New series. 8: 221–264.
- Ward, James (1896). Aitchison, George (ed.). The Principles of Ornament (Second ed.). London: Chapman and Hall – via Internet Archive.
