= Royal Gold Medal =

Medal awarded by the Royal Institute of British Architects

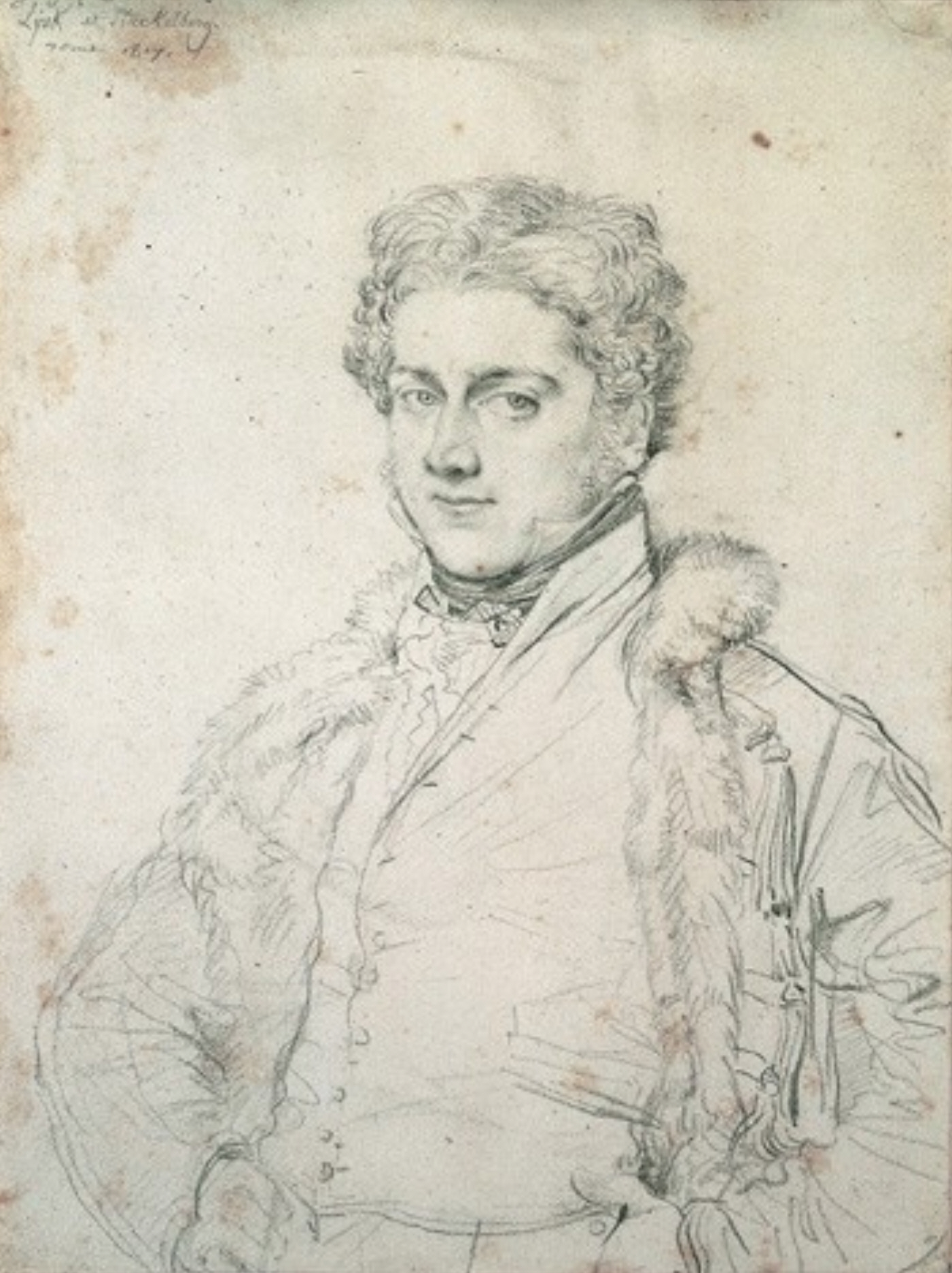
English architect Charles Robert Cockerell was the first recipient of the Royal Gold Medal in 1848.

The Royal Gold Medal for architecture is awarded annually by the Royal Institute of British Architects on behalf of the British monarch, in recognition of an individual's or group's substantial contribution to international architecture. It is given for a distinguished body of work rather than for one building and is therefore not awarded for merely being currently fashionable.

The medal was first awarded in 1848 to Charles Robert Cockerell, and its second recipient was the Italian Luigi Canina in 1849. The winners include some of the most influential architects of the 19th and 20th centuries, including Eugène Viollet-le-Duc (1864), Frank Lloyd Wright (1941), Le Corbusier (1953), Walter Gropius (1956), Ludwig Mies van der Rohe (1959) and Buckminster Fuller (1968). Candidates of all nationalities are eligible to receive the award.

Not all recipients were architects. Also recognised were engineers such as Ove Arup (1966) and Peter Rice (1992), who undoubtedly played an outstanding role in the realisation of some of the 20th century's key buildings all over the world. Repeatedly, the prize was awarded to influential writers on architecture, including scholars such as the Rev Robert Willis (1862), Sir Nikolaus Pevsner (1967), and Sir John Summerson (1976), as well as theoreticians such as Lewis Mumford (1961) and Colin Rowe (1995). It honoured archaeologists such as Sir Austen Henry Layard (1868), Karl Richard Lepsius (1869), Melchior de Vogüé (1879), Heinrich Schliemann (1885), Rodolfo Lanciani (1900) and Sir Arthur Evans (1909), and painters such as Lord Leighton (1894), and Sir Lawrence Alma-Tadema (1906). Another notable exception was the 1999 award to the city of Barcelona.

== List of recipients ==
Year	Recipient	Nationality
2026	Níall McLaughlin	Ireland
2025	Kazuyo Sejima and Ryue Nishizawa (SANAA)	Japan
2024	Lesley Lokko	Ghana/Scotland
2023	Yasmeen Lari	Pakistan
2022	Balkrishna Vithaldas Doshi	India
2021	Sir David Adjaye	UK/Ghana
2020	Grafton Architects (Practice co-founded by Shelley McNamara and Yvonne Farrell)	Ireland
2019	Sir Nicholas Grimshaw	UK
2018	Neave Brown	U.S./UK
2017	Paulo Mendes da Rocha	Brazil
2016	Dame Zaha Hadid	Iraq/UK
2015	Sheila O'Donnell and John Tuomey (Co-founders of O'Donnell & Tuomey)	Ireland
2014	Joseph Rykwert	UK
2013	Peter Zumthor	Switzerland
2012	Herman Hertzberger	Netherlands
2011	David Chipperfield	UK
2010	I. M. Pei	China/U.S.
2009	Álvaro Siza Vieira	Portugal
2008	Edward Cullinan	UK
2007	Herzog & de Meuron	Switzerland
2006	Toyo Ito	Japan
2005	Frei Otto	Germany
2004	Rem Koolhaas	Netherlands
2003	Rafael Moneo	Spain
2002	Archigram	UK
2001	Jean Nouvel	France
2000	Frank Gehry	U.S.
1999	City of Barcelona	Spain
1998	Oscar Niemeyer	Brazil
1997	Tadao Ando	Japan
1996	Harry Seidler	Austria/Australia
1995	Colin Rowe	UK/U.S.
1994	Michael and Patricia Hopkins	UK
1993	Giancarlo De Carlo	Italy
1992	Peter Rice	Ireland
1991	Colin Stansfield Smith	UK
1990	Aldo van Eyck	Netherlands
1989	Renzo Piano	Italy
1988	Richard Meier	U.S.
1987	Ralph Erskine	UK
1986	Arata Isozaki	Japan
1985	Sir Richard Rogers	UK
1984	Charles Correa	India
1983	Sir Norman Foster	UK
1982	Berthold Lubetkin	UK/Georgia
1981	Sir Philip Dowson	UK
1980	James Stirling	UK
1979	Charles and Ray Eames	U.S.
1978	Jørn Utzon	Denmark
1977	Sir Denys Lasdun	UK
1976	Sir John Summerson	UK
1975	Michael Scott	Ireland
1974	Powell and Moya	UK
1973	Sir Leslie Martin	UK
1972	Louis I Kahn	U.S.
1971	Hubert de Cronin Hastings	UK
1970	Robert Matthew	UK
1969	Jack Coia	UK
1968	Buckminster Fuller	U.S.
1967	Sir Nikolaus Pevsner	UK
1966	Ove Arup	UK
1965	Kenzo Tange	Japan
1964	Edwin Maxwell Fry	UK
1963	William Holford, Baron Holford	UK
1962	Sven Markelius	Sweden
1961	Lewis Mumford	U.S.
1960	Pier Luigi Nervi	Italy
1959	Ludwig Mies van der Rohe	Germany/U.S.
1958	Robert Schofield Morris	Canada
1957	Alvar Aalto	Finland
1956	Walter Gropius	Germany/U.S.
1955	John Murray Easton	UK
1954	Sir Arthur George Stephenson	Australia
1953	Le Corbusier	France
1952	George Grey Wornum	UK
1951	Emanuel Vincent Harris	UK
1950	Eliel Saarinen	Finland
1949	Sir Howard Robertson	UK
1948	Auguste Perret	France
1947	Sir Albert Richardson	UK
1946	Sir Patrick Abercrombie	UK
1945	Victor Vesnin	USSR
1944	Sir Edward Maufe	UK
1943	Sir Charles Herbert Reilly	UK
1942	William Curtis Green	UK
1941	Frank Lloyd Wright	U.S.
1940	Charles Voysey	UK
1939	Sir Percy Thomas	UK
1938	Ivar Tengbom	Sweden
1937	Sir Raymond Unwin	UK
1936	Charles Holden	UK
1935	Willem Marinus Dudok	Netherlands
1934	Henry Vaughan Lanchester	UK
1933	Sir Charles Reed Peers	UK
1932	Hendrik Petrus Berlage	Netherlands
1931	Sir Edwin Cooper	UK
1930	Percy Worthington	UK
1929	Victor Laloux	France
1928	Sir Guy Dawber	UK
1927	Sir Herbert Baker	UK
1926	Ragnar Östberg	Sweden
1925	Sir Giles Gilbert Scott	UK
1924	No award	N/A
1923	Sir John James Burnet	UK
1922	Thomas Hastings	U.S.
1921	Sir Edwin Lutyens	UK
1920	Charles Girault	France
1919	Leonard Stokes	UK
1918	Ernest Newton	UK
1917	Henri Paul Nénot	France
1916	Sir Robert Rowand Anderson	UK
1915	Frank Darling	Canada
1914	Jean-Louis Pascal	France
1913	Sir Reginald Blomfield	UK
1912	Basil Champneys	UK
1911	Wilhelm Dörpfeld	UK
1910	Sir Thomas Graham Jackson	UK
1909	Sir Arthur Evans	UK
1908	Honoré Daumet	France
1907	John Belcher	UK
1906	Sir Lawrence Alma-Tadema	Netherlands
1905	Sir Aston Webb	UK
1904	Auguste Choisy	France
1903	Charles Follen McKim	U.S.
1902	Thomas Edward Collcutt	UK
1901	No award	N/A
1900	Rodolfo Lanciani	Italy
1899	George Frederick Bodley	UK
1898	George Aitchison	UK
1897	Pierre Cuypers	Netherlands
1896	Sir Ernest George	UK
1895	James Brooks	UK
1894	Lord Leighton	UK
1893	Richard Morris Hunt	U.S.
1892	César Daly	France
1891	Sir Arthur Blomfield	UK
1890	John Gibson	UK
1889	Sir Charles Thomas Newton	UK
1888	Baron Theophil von Hansen	Austria
1887	Ewan Christian	UK
1886	Charles Garnier	France
1885	Heinrich Schliemann	Germany
1884	William Butterfield	UK
1883	Francis Penrose	UK
1882	Heinrich von Ferstel	Austria
1881	George Godwin	UK
1880	John Loughborough Pearson	UK
1879	Marquis Melchior de Vogüé	France
1878	Alfred Waterhouse	UK
1877	Charles Barry	UK
1876	Joseph-Louis Duc	France
1875	Edmund Sharpe	UK
1874	George Edmund Street	UK
1873	Thomas Henry Wyatt	UK
1872	Friedrich von Schmidt	Germany/Austria
1871	James Fergusson	UK
1870	Benjamin Ferrey	UK
1869	Karl Richard Lepsius	Germany
1868	Sir Austen Henry Layard	UK
1867	Charles Texier	France
1866	Sir Matthew Digby Wyatt	UK
1865	Sir James Pennethorne	UK
1864	Eugène Viollet-le-Duc	France
1863	Anthony Salvin	UK
1862	Rev Robert Willis	UK
1861	Jean-Baptiste Lesueur	France
1860	Sydney Smirke	UK
1859	Sir George Gilbert Scott	UK
1858	Friedrich August Stüler	Germany
1857	Owen Jones	UK
1856	Sir William Tite	UK
1855	Jacques Ignace Hittorff	France
1854	Philip Hardwick	UK
1853	Sir Robert Smirke	UK
1852	Leo von Klenze	Germany
1851	Thomas Leverton Donaldson	UK
1850	Sir Charles Barry	UK
1849	Luigi Canina	Italy
1848	Charles Robert Cockerell	UK
