= Gran Madre di Dio, Turin =

Gran Madre di Dio
- Chiesa della Gran Madre di Dio
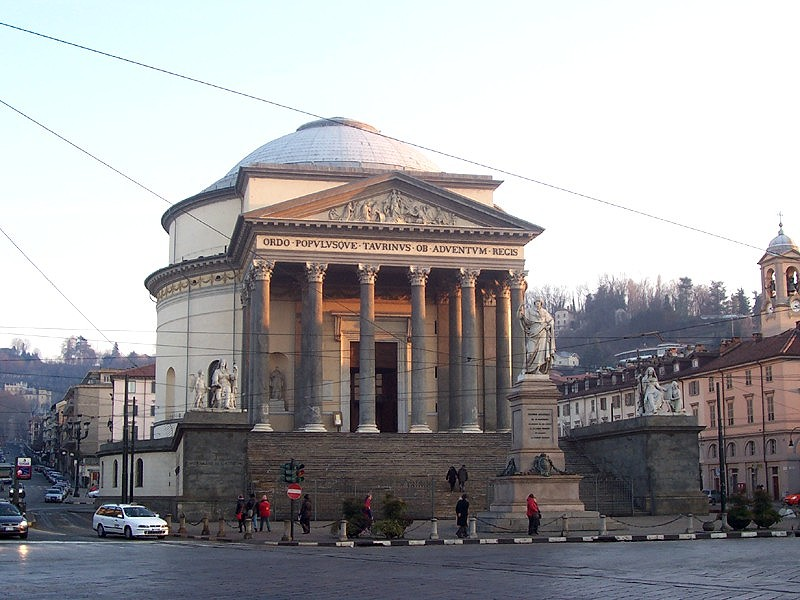
- Façade of the church

- Map of Turin
- 45.0622°N 7.6991°E
- Location: Turin, Piedmont
- Country: Italy
- Denomination: Roman Catholic Church

History
- Dedication: Mary, Mother of Jesus

Architecture
- Groundbreaking: 1818
- Completed: 1831

Administration
- Archdiocese: Roman Catholic Archdiocese of Turin

Gran Madre di Dio (Great Mother of God) is a Neoclassic-style church in Turin, Italy, dedicated to Mary, Mother of God. It is located on the eastern, or right, bank of the Po River, facing the Ponte Vittorio Emanuele I leading into Piazza Vittorio Veneto.

== Description ==
The church was conceived in 1814, after the defeat of Napoleon, to celebrate the return to the throne of King Victor Emmanuel I of Sardinia from the Savoia family, after a 16 years long exile. The municipality immediately suggests to celebrate this return with the building of a monument. The necessity to plan out the spaces, which were recently employed by the fortification and the idea to build a votive temple, have to be seen as a unitary project. Actually, the church has to be the ending to the lengthy vista, which links the Castello Square to the hill. Together with the planning of this Church, a square for the latter also needs to be implanted in the project, which would be a sort of lengthening of the already existing Vittorio Square on the other side of the river. The architect was Ferdinando Bonsignore, whose project was chosen following a competition. Construction began in 1818, only to pause for nearly a decade, and restart in 1827, under the rule of Charles Felix of Sardinia. The church was inaugurated in 1831 under Charles Albert of Sardinia.

Others who contributed to the construction were Giuseppe Formento and the engineer Virginio Bordino. The latter helped raise the columns on the façade. The architect Luigi Canina was consulted during construction. Flanking the entrance staircase, atop two high plinths, are two statues representing Faith (with calyx) and Religion by Carlo Chelli. The tympanum of the church states: ORDO POPVLVSQVE TAVRINVS OB ADVENTVM REGIS, which can be translated as: The Nobility and the People of Turin for the Return of the King. The church architecture was inspired by the Pantheon in Rome. The link between the political event with the religious one comes through thanks to the classical metaphors to talk about the religious episodes with a back and forth between religious and political personalities. In front of the church is a statue of a King Vittorio Emanuele I, walking forward, holding a staff in his right arm, the base reads Vittorio Emanuele I/ Re di Sardegna/ Restituito a su Pepolo/il XX Maggio MDCCCXIV/ Ne Coronara/ la Fedeltà secolare.
