= Lewis Glucksman Gallery =

Art museum in Cork city, Ireland

The Glucksman
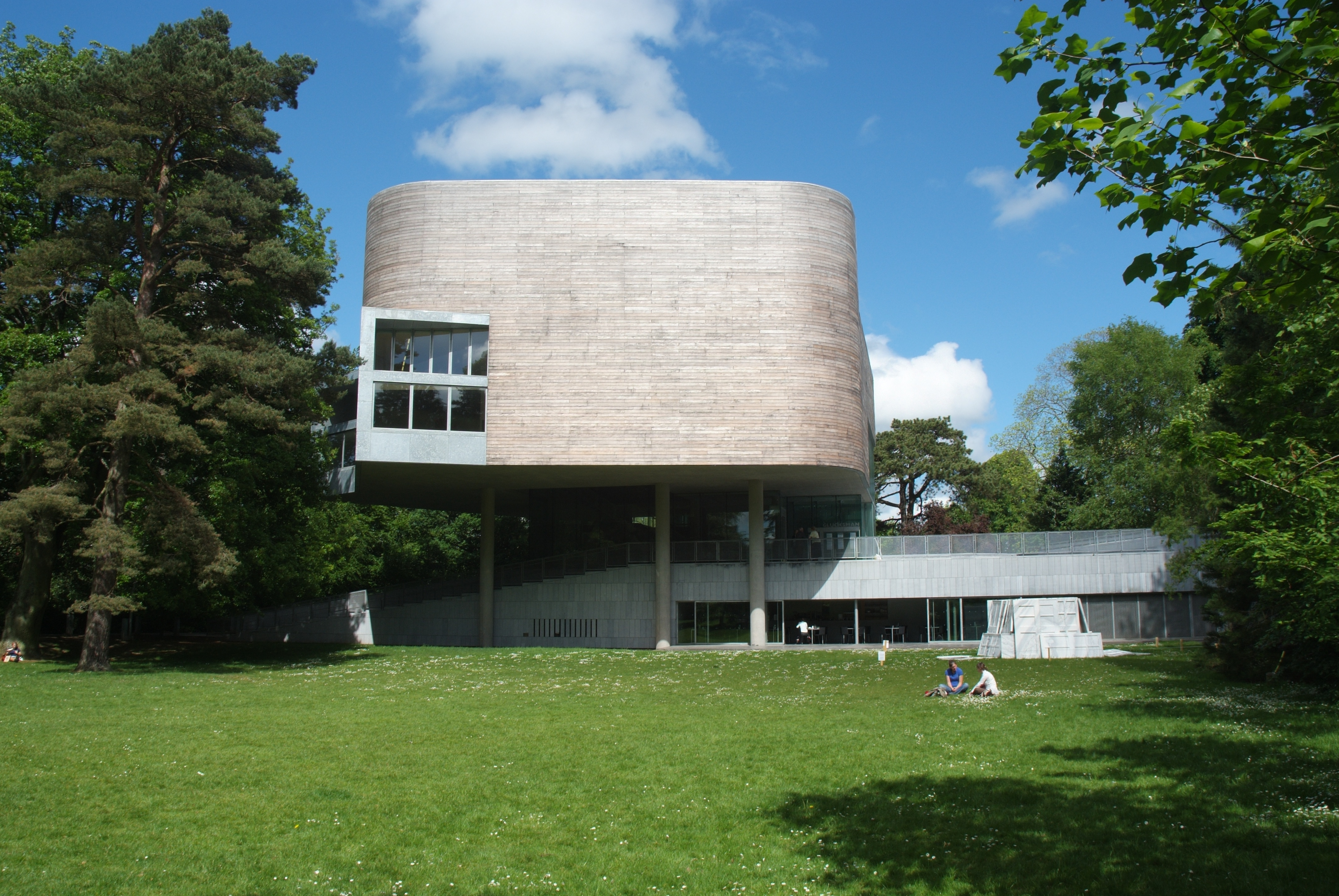

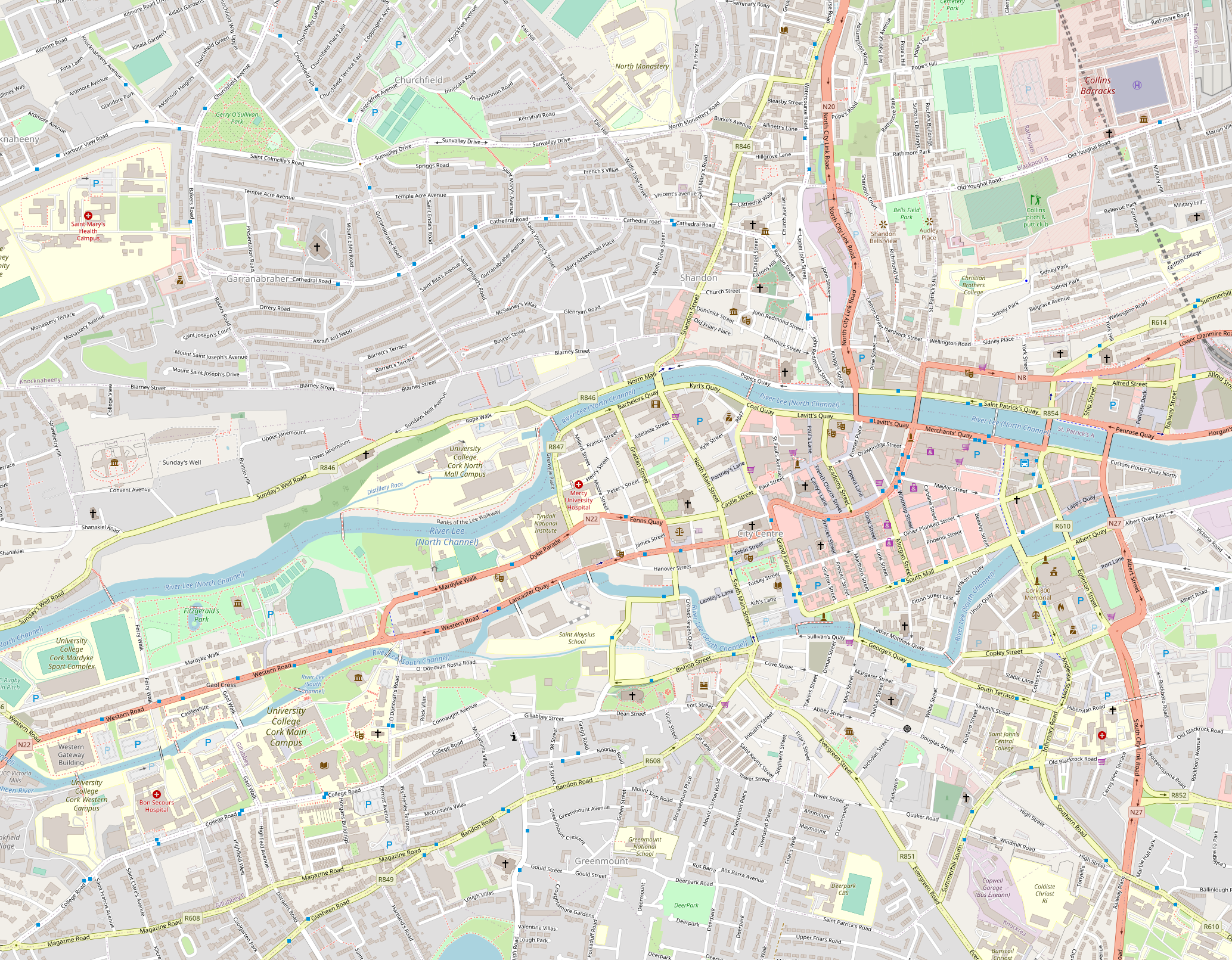
- Location within Cork Central
- Location: Cork, Ireland
- Coordinates: 51.894738°N 8.490321°W
- Public transit access: Bus or taxi to Western Road (College gates)
- Website: glucksman.org

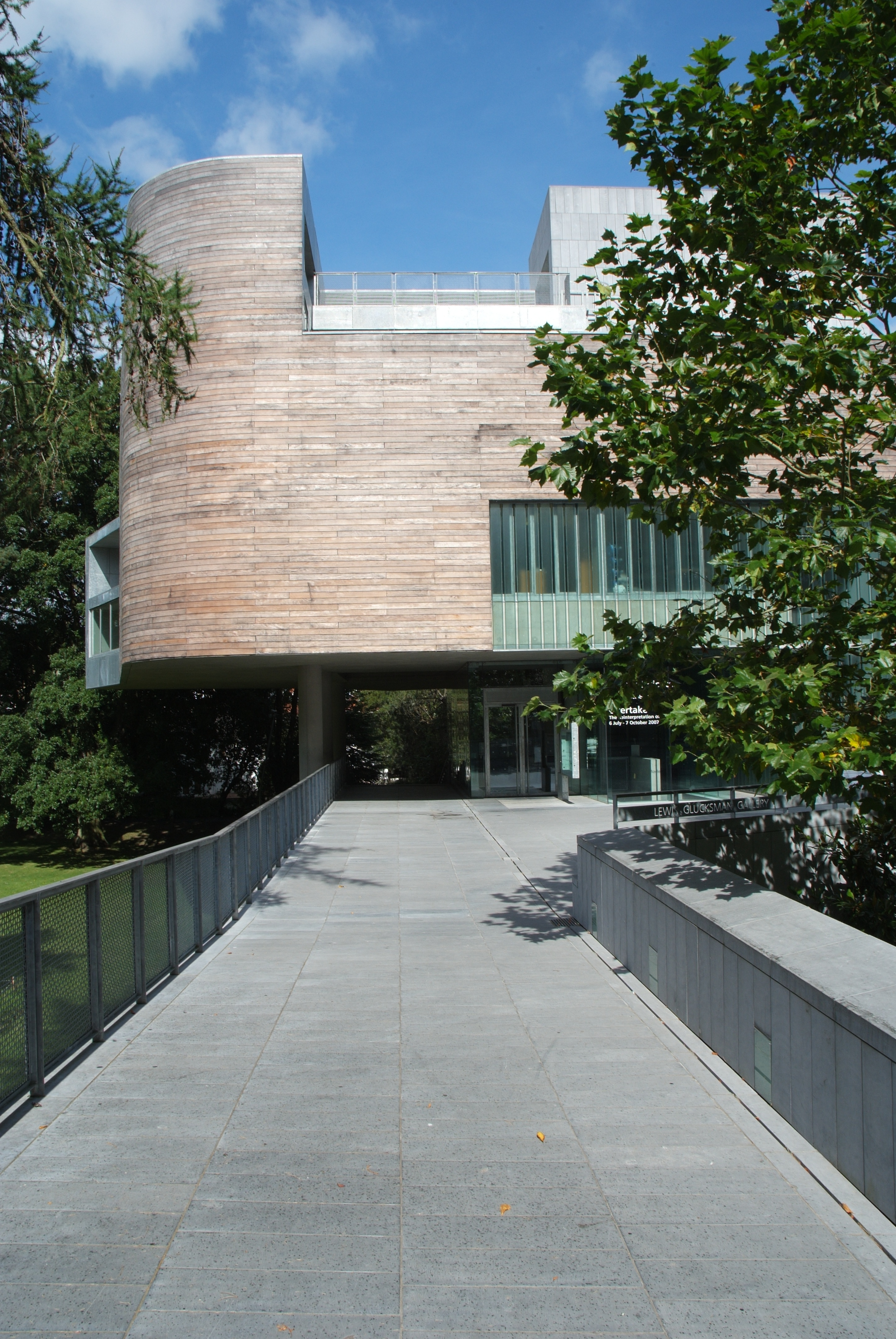
The Glucksman - view from UCC Lower Grounds

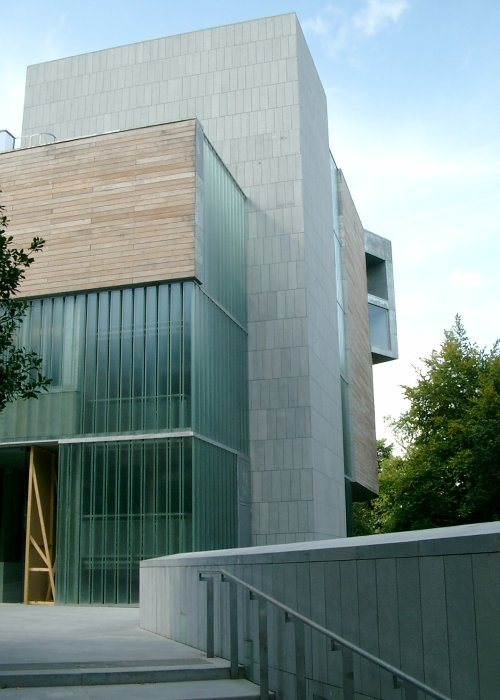
The Glucksman - Exterior

The Glucksman, formerly known as the Lewis Glucksman Gallery (Irish: Áiléar Lewis Glucksman), is an art museum in University College Cork, Ireland.

Opened to the public by the President of Ireland, Mary McAleese on 14 October 2004, the Glucksman was named 'Best Public Building in Ireland' by the Royal Institute of the Architects of Ireland in June 2005. Designed by Irish practice O'Donnell & Tuomey architects and Arup Consulting Engineers, the architecture of the museum has been awarded several respected prizes, including a UK Civic Trust award, an RIBA award, as well as inclusion on the final shortlist for the 2005 Stirling Prize.

The gallery, along with other buildings on UCC's campus, was flooded during the 2009 Cork Floods. It closed from November 2009 until January 2010 for repairs.

In 2022, the Glucksman was the recipient of the European Museum Academy's Art Museum Award, focusing on the social role of museums.

University College Cork is substantially located on a single campus adjoining Cork city centre and the museum building occupies an accessible site close to the main entrance of the campus. The museum has three floors of display spaces and the temporary exhibitions programme focuses on thematic shows which have included Through the Looking Glass: Childhood in Contemporary Photography, Cooling Out: on the paradox of feminism and Overtake: the reinterpretation of modern art.

The museum is named for its benefactor, Wall Street financier and chairman of Lehman Brothers, Kuhn, Loeb Inc., Lewis Glucksman. The inaugural director, Fiona Kearney, is a fellow of the Clore Leadership Programme and an alumnus of the Salzburg Global Seminar.
