= Sheila O'Donnell =

Irish architect

- Born: 1953 (age 72–73); Dublin, Ireland
- Education: University College Dublin; Royal College of Art
- Occupation: Architect
- Spouse: John Tuomey
- Partner: John Tuomey
- Awards: Downes Medal; RIAI Triennial Gold Medal; Fellow American Institute of Architect; Royal Gold Medal
- Practice: O'Donnell + Tuomey
- Buildings: Photographer's Gallery (London); The Lyric Theater (Belfast)
- Projects: Venice Biennale of Architecture

Sheila O'Donnell (born 1953) is an Irish architect who co-founded the O'Donnell & Tuomey partnership in 1988. Her work has been cited as "thoughtful and inspired, rigorous and whimsical" by her Honorary Fellowship sponsor.

== Early life and education ==
Born in Dublin, O'Donnell graduated from University College Dublin with a degree in architecture in 1976. In 1980, she received her master's degree in environmental design from the Royal College of Art, winning the prize for best-graduating student.

== Career ==
On graduating in Dublin, O'Donnell first worked for 18 months with James Stirling and worked on the detailed design of the Tate's Clore Gallery on Millbank before returning to Dublin in 1981.

In 1988, she and her husband, John Tuomey, established O'Donnell + Tuomey Architects in Dublin. The firm has won many national awards, including the Downes Medal from the Architectural Association of Ireland on seven occasions since 1988, and the RIAI Gold Medal in 2000. The couple have represented Ireland twice at the Venice Biennale of Architecture (2004 and 2008) and have been nominated for several European awards.

O'Donnell was involved with a small group of architects interested in the development of the centre of Dublin in the early 1980s. She helped set up the Blue Studio Architecture Gallery, which produced proposals and books. As a result, in 1991, she became a director of this group of architects, named Group 91 Architects. The group won the architectural framework competition for the development of Dublin's Temple Bar. The work was completed in 1998 and has been widely published.

Some of O'Donnell's work has been characterised by the use of watercolour studies, which have been exhibited at the Royal Academy in London and at the Royal Hibernian Academy in Dublin. She was involved in the design of a students' centre for the London School of Economics and a building for the Photographers' Gallery in Soho. More of her work has been centred on housing, schools, and cultural institutions in Dublin, including the Irish Film Institute (1992) and an extension to Ranelagh School (1998). More recently, in collaboration with the Irish Department of Education, O'Donnell has worked on the design of Cherry Orchard School, a primary school pilot project for disadvantaged communities. It has received many awards and was published by the OECD (Organisation for Economic Co-operation and Development) as an exemplary educational building.

Sheila O'Donnell is a full-time professor at University College, Dublin and has been a visiting teacher and critic at schools of architecture in Japan, Venezuela, and the United States, including Princeton, Michigan, Buffalo, Yale, Columbia, Syracuse, and Cooper Union. In 2010, she was elected an Honorary Fellow of the American Institute of Architects. She is also an external examiner for the Department of Architecture at Cambridge University and for the Architectural Association, London.

== Projects ==
=== Built Work ===
- Temple Bar regeneration, 1989-2011.
- TCD Irish Art Research Centre, Dublin, Ireland, 2007.
- Sean O'Casey Community Center, Dublin, Ireland, 2008.
- Gray House, Dublin, Ireland, 2008.
- Lives of Spaces, Biennale 2012, Venice, Italy.
- Timberyard Housing, Dublin, Ireland, 2009.
- Irish Language Cultural Center, Derry, Northern Ireland, 2009.
- Sandford Park School, Dublin, Ireland, 2016–2019.
- Sunday's Well Houses, Cork, Ireland, 2013–2018.
- Folding Landscape / East and West, Biennale 2018, Venice, Italy.
- Central European University, Phase 01, Budapest, Hungary, 2011–2016.
- LSE Saw Swee Hock Student Centre, London, UK, 2009–2015.
- St. Angela's College, Cork, Ireland, 1999–2015.
- The Lyric Theatre, Belfast, Northern Ireland, 2003–2011.
- Photographers' Gallery London, London, UK, 2007–2012.
- Stratford Waterfront Masterplan, London, UK, 2015–2017.
- Olympicopolis Masterplan, London, UK, 2017.
- Cavanagh Bridge UCC, Cork, Ireland, 2006–2018.
- UCC Student Hub, Cork, Ireland, 2015-2019.
- V&A East Museum, London, UK, 2015–2024.
- Sadler's Wells Dance Theatre, London, UK, 2015–2025.
- Liverpool University School of Architecture, Liverpool, UK, 2019-
- The Prow, Stratford Housing, London, UK, 2017-
- Swords Cultural Quarter, Swords, Ireland, 2021-

=== Competitions ===
- Pillar Monument, Dublin, Ireland, 1988
- Temple Bar regeneration plan, Dublin, Ireland, 1989.
- University College Cork Good Shepherd Convent, Cork, Ireland, 1995.
- Trinity College Dublin Pearse Street Masterplan, Dublin, Ireland, 2002.
- London School of Economics Student Centre, London, UK, 2009.
- Frankfurt Museum of World Cultures, Frankfurt, Germany, 2010.
- Worcester College Lecture Theatre and Kitchens, Oxford, UK, 2011.
- Olympicopolis Masterplan, London, UK, 2015.
- Shanghai Opera House, Shanghai, China, 2016.
- UCD Future Campus, Dublin, Ireland, 2018.
- Gruner + Jahr Headquarter, Hamburg, Germany, 2018.
- Willy Brandt Strasse, Hamburg, Germany, 2019.
- Liverpool School of Architecture, Liverpool, UK, 2019.
- Avenue Denfert, Paris, France, 2019.
- Johns Hopkins Center, Baltimore, USA, 2020.
- University of York Student Centre, York, UK, 2022.

== Recognition ==
In 2010, O'Donnell was elected an honorary fellow of the American Institute of Architects. In 2013 she was shortlisted for the Architects' Journal's Woman Architect of the Year award.

In 2015, O'Donnell + Tuomey won the 2015 RIBA Royal Gold Medal, the world's most prestigious architecture award. The award is approved by the British sovereign (Elizabeth II), to architects who have made a large impact on architecture.

== Bibliography ==
- O'Donnell + Tuomey (Co-authored by John Tuomey), Princeton Architectural Press, 2006, ISBN 978-1-568-98601-2
