= Luigi Canina =

Italian archaeologist and architect

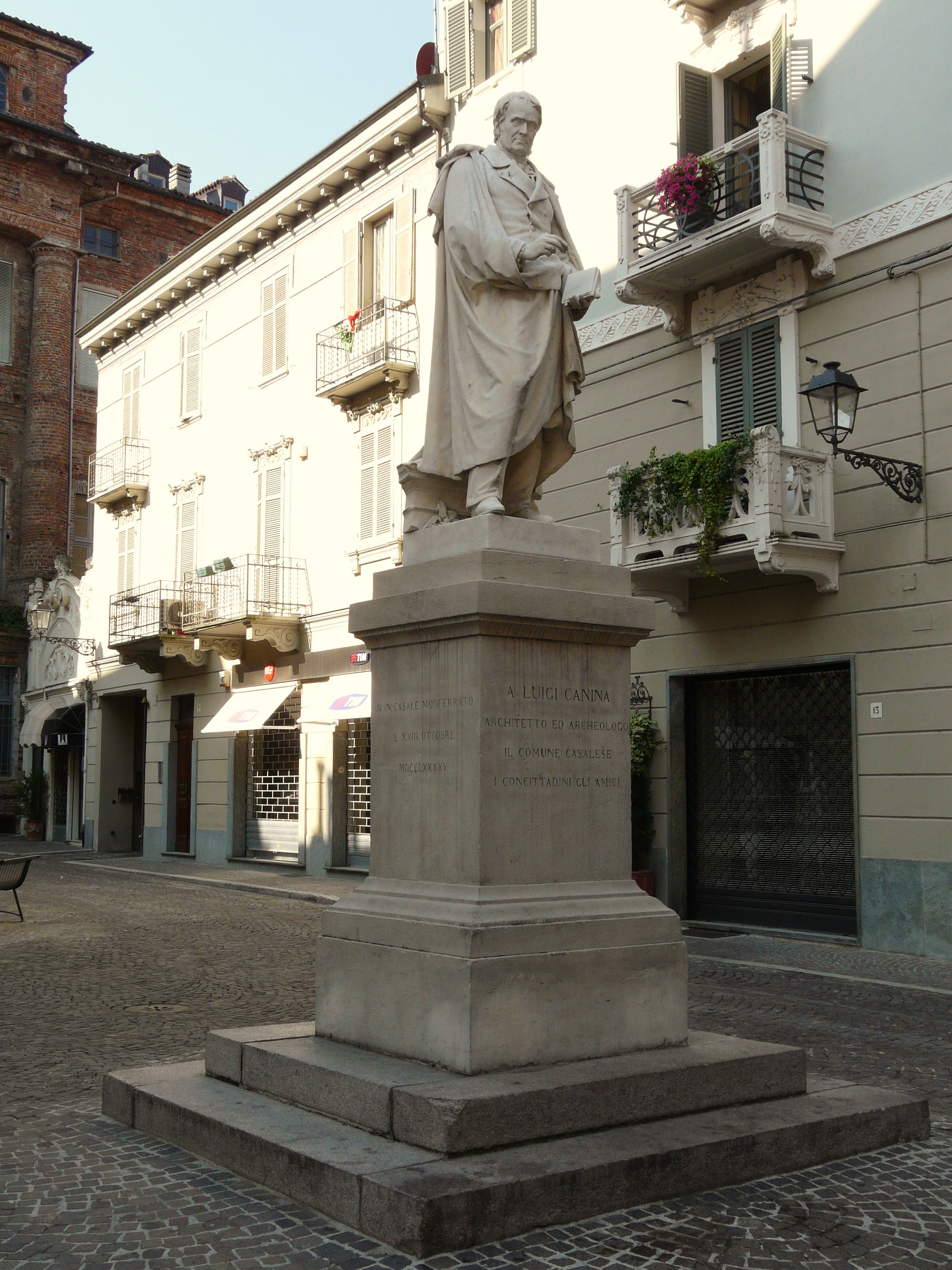
- Monumento to Luigi Canina by Benedetto Cacciatori, 1865, Casale Monferrato
- Born: 23 October 1795; Casale Monferrato, Kingdom of Sardinia
- Died: 17 October 1856 (aged 60); Florence, Grand Duchy of Tuscany
- Resting place: Santa Croce, Florence
- Occupations: Archaeologist; Architect
- Movement: Neoclassicism
- Awards: Royal Gold Medal (1849)

Signature
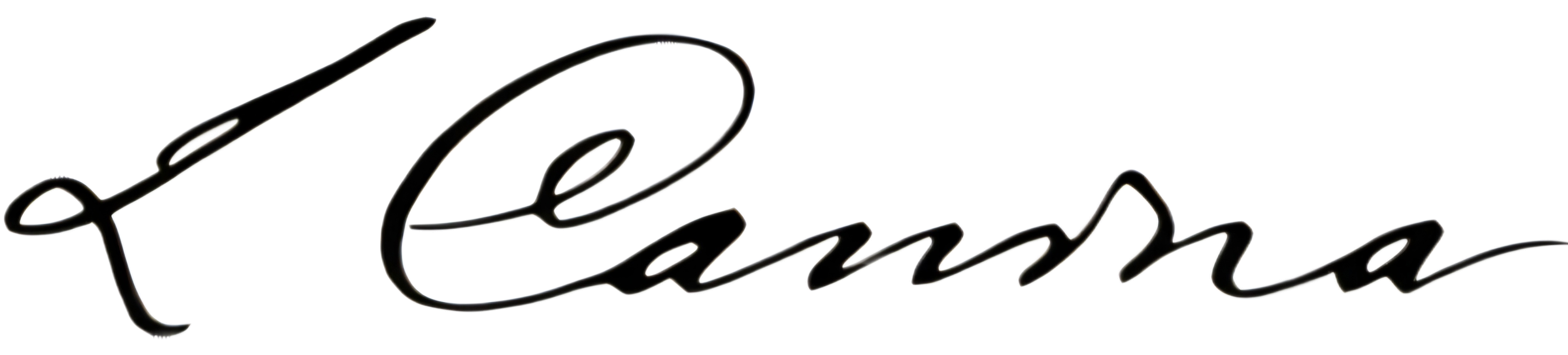

Luigi Canina (23 October 1795 – 17 October 1856) was an Italian archaeologist and architect. Together with Giuseppe Valadier, he was a leading figure of archaeologically correct Neoclassicism in early-19 century Rome. He was the second recipient of the Royal Gold Medal, awarded in 1849. In England, he restored interiors at Alnwick Castle, Northumberland.

== Biography ==
=== Early life and education ===
Luigi Canina, an Italian architect and archaeologist, was born in Casale Monferrato in 1795. He studied architecture at the University of Turin (1810–12) under Ferdinando Bonsignore and his assistant Giuseppe Talucchi (1782–1863). After serving (1812–14) in the fortress of Alessandria, he resumed his studies and obtained a degree in architecture in 1814.

He served a period of apprenticeship under Talucchi, who helped him obtain a three-year grant from the Court of Turin for further study in Rome, where Canina settled in January 1818. He worked on engravings of Roman monuments under the antiquarian, scholar and publisher Mariano Vasi (1744–1820), and at the end of his three-year period as pensionato, he presented a survey of the Colosseum (Anfiteatro Flavio descritto, misurato e restaurato) to the architects of the Accademia di San Luca, including Giuseppe Valadier, who were much impressed.

=== Early career ===
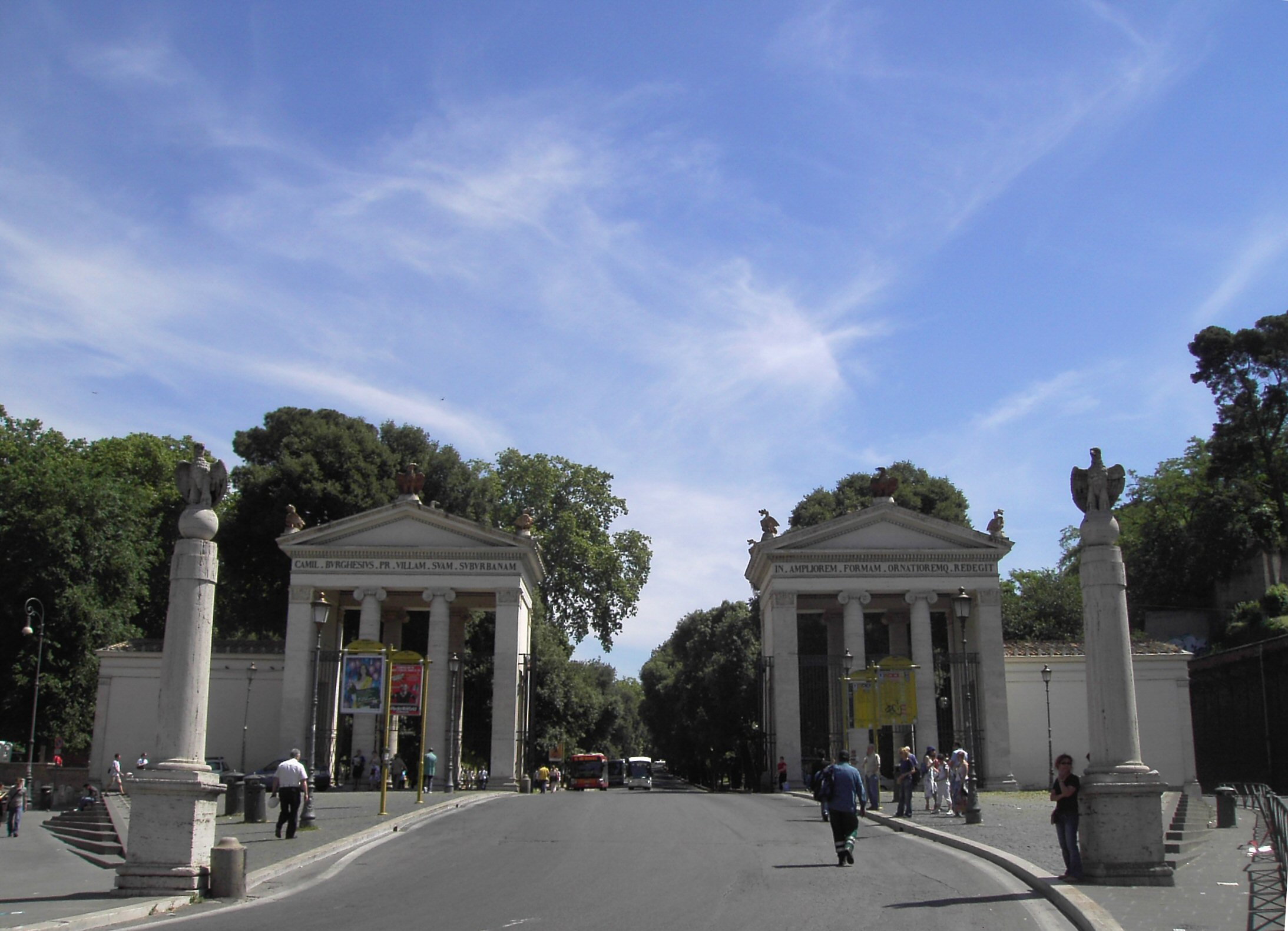
Villa Borghese: monumental entrance from Piazzale Flaminio

In 1824 Canina was appointed to execute his scheme for the expansion of Villa Borghese gardens, Rome. Canina’s plan (10 watercolours, 1820–22; Rome, Biblioteca Casanatense) was modelled on Hadrian's Villa at Tivoli, providing an architectural solution for the new main entrance near the Porta del Popolo and the two bridges crossing the Via delle Tre Madonne. On the first bridge, the road is flanked on each side by Egyptian propylaea: two obelisks and two truncated, pyramidal pylons linked by porticos with lotus-shaped capitals (1826–7). The road on the second bridge passes under the Arch of Septimius Severus. This was designed with a single barrel vault and simplified decoration. The attic is replaced by a three-stepped platform, which supports a restored ancient statue (Septimius Severus), part of a former garden monument. The main entrance (on the present Piazzale Flaminio) is emphasized by large Ionic propylaea (1827–33), influenced by Luigi Cagnola's Porta Ticinese in Milan. The elegant iron gate, decorated with Greek motifs, is flanked by two porticos with tympani, which are surmounted by acroteria with eagles and griffins in low relief. The square in front of the gate was also designed by Canina.

After succeeding Virgilio Fontana as architect of the Borghese properties, Canina continued (1825–7) with lesser projects in the Villa Borghese. He worked on the Greek-style façade and the Egyptian room in the Casino Vagnuzzi outside of Porta del Popolo and did maintenance and renovation in the Palazzo Borghese and Borghese Chapel in Santa Maria Maggiore. A mechanical chair lift was designed by him for the Palazzo Borghese. Over a period of 20 years he also supervised the renovation of buildings surrounding the Piazza Borghese and in the adjacent quarter.

=== Archaeological work ===
Canina pursued his archaeological and historical interests throughout his life. In 1827 he published the first volume of his magnum opus, L’architettura dei principali popoli antichi considerata nei monumenti (Ancient architecture described and represented in documents), which covers archaeology, architectural history and civic architecture in three sections on Greece, Rome and Egypt. The second section, L’architettura romana, began to appear in instalments from 1830, published by Canina’s own printing and engraving establishment. This work began a period of intense typographical and editorial activity throughout the Roman publishing trade. L’architettura egiziana, which came out in 1839, actually included all non-Classical styles of ancient architecture.

In 1839, after directing excavations in the Borghese properties (e.g. the Torrenova mosaic in 1834; excavations on the Esquiline Hill, 1848–50), Canina was named Commissario alle Antichità di Roma and appointed director of the excavations at Tusculum and Veii. In the latter post he succeeded Luigi Biondi (1776–1839), with whom he had collaborated since 1825. A column opposite the basilica of Saint Sebastian on the Appian Way close to Rome records Canina's work in rescuing many Roman ruins and turning the road into the archaeological park that it is today.

=== Later career ===
Canina’s relations with the Piedmontese court continued with a journey to Turin (1843) in the entourage of Mary Christina, who commissioned Canina’s study of Christian architecture and the proposals for Turin Cathedral. The work (1843) was an important contribution to 19th-century architectural theory, including the debate on the forms of churches, for which Canina proposed the basilical type. Around this time Canina completed a supplement to Antoine Desgodetz’s work on the ancient buildings of Rome and wrote on the architecture of the ancient Hebrews and the Temple of Jerusalem (1845), attempting a reconstruction of the latter. Canina also visited London in 1845, where he built on existing contacts with members of the Royal Institute of British Architects, in particular Charles Robert Cockerell and Thomas Leverton Donaldson. In the same year he was entrusted with a project for the church of the sanctuary of Oropa, Biella, for which he produced large-scale drawings and a wooden model (Biella, Archivio e Museo del Santuario).

He visited London again in 1851 to visit the Great Exhibition, and the following year, in a publication with numerous plates, he proposed a Pompeian decoration for Joseph Paxton’s Crystal Palace, as well as the application of decorations derived from the most diverse ancient civilizations, in iron and wood, to various types of modern buildings.

In the early 1850s Canina focused his archaeological studies on excavations in the Roman Forum, at the location of the Basilica Julia (1850), and in the Appian Way (1850–53). He also contributed to the preparatory work for the drainage of the Pontine Marshes and planned the reactivation of the Aqua Marcia in Rome. In 1855 he was elected president of the Capitoline Museums and enrolled in the Roman nobility.

=== Alnwick Castle ===
Canina’s pupil and collaborator Giovanni Montiroli (1817–91) was sent by Canina to Algernon Percy, 4th Duke of Northumberland, in 1854; Montiroli was followed by the painter Alessandro Mantovani (1814–92), who headed a group of Italian craftsmen working on the modernization of the interior of Alnwick Castle. In 1856 Canina himself went to Alnwick; he died in Florence on his return journey and was buried there in Santa Croce. In 1843, he had been elected into the National Academy of Design as an Honorary member.

== Partial Anthology ==
1. Luigi, Canina (1841). L'architettura antica descritta e dimostrata coi monumenti, Volume 6, Sezione II, Architettura Greca, Parte Terza. Rome: Tipi dello stesso Canina.
2. Luigi, Canina (1841). L'architettura antica descritta e dimostrata coi monumenti, Sezione I, Architettura Egiziani. Rome: Tipi dello stesso Canina.
3. Luigi, Canina (1841). L'architettura antica descritta e dimostrata coi monumenti, Volume 1. Rome: Tipi dello stesso Canina.
4. Luigi, Canina (1850). Indicazione topografica di Roma antica in corrispondenza dell ´epoca imperiale, 4th edition. Rome: Tipi dello stesso Canina.
5. Luigi, Canina (1845). Ricerche sull architettura piu propria dei tempi cristiani e applicazione della medesima ad una idea di sostituzione della chiesa Cattedrale di San Giovanni in Torino. Rome: Tipi dello stesso Canina.
6. Luigi, Canina (1845). Esposizione storica e topografica del Foro romano e sue adiacenze, 2nd edition. Tipi dello stesso Canina.
7. Luigi, Canina (1834). L'architettura Romana descritta e dimostrata coi monumenti, Part I. Rome: Tipi dello stesso Canina.
8. Luigi, Canina (1838). Descrizione di Cere antica ed in particolare del monumento sepolcrale nell'anno 1836 da S.E. il Sig. Generale Vicenzo Galassi.... Rome: Tipi dello stesso Canina.

== Bibliography ==
- Oechslin, Werner (1975). "CANINA, Luigi". Dizionario Biografico degli Italiani (in Italian). Vol. 18: Canella–Cappello. Rome: Istituto dell'Enciclopedia Italiana. ISBN 978-88-12-00032-6.
- Sistri, Augusto, ed. (1995). Luigi Canina, 1795–1856: Architetto e Teorico del Classicismo. Milan: Guerini & Associati.
- Farinati, Valeria (2003). "Canina, Luigi". Grove Art Online. Oxford University Press. doi:10.1093/gao/9781884446054.article.T013690.
