= John Tuomey =

Irish architect

- Born: 1954 (age 71–72); Tralee, County Kerry, Ireland
- Education: University College Dublin
- Occupation: Architect
- Spouse: Sheila O'Donnell
- Awards: RIAI Gold Medal (twice); Royal Gold Medal; Elected to Aosdána (2011)
- Practice: O'Donnell & Tuomey
- Buildings: Neue Staatsgalerie; Lyric Theatre, Belfast
- Projects: Temple Bar, Dublin
- Website: odonnell-tuomey.ie

John Tuomey FRIAI FRIBA, Hon FAIA Hon RSUA (born 1954) is an Irish architect. He is a member of Aosdána, an Irish association of artists, and is best known for his work with his wife Sheila O'Donnell in the O'Donnell & Tuomey firm (founded 1988).

== Early life ==
Tuomey was born in Tralee in 1954; he spent most of his childhood in Dundalk.

== Career ==
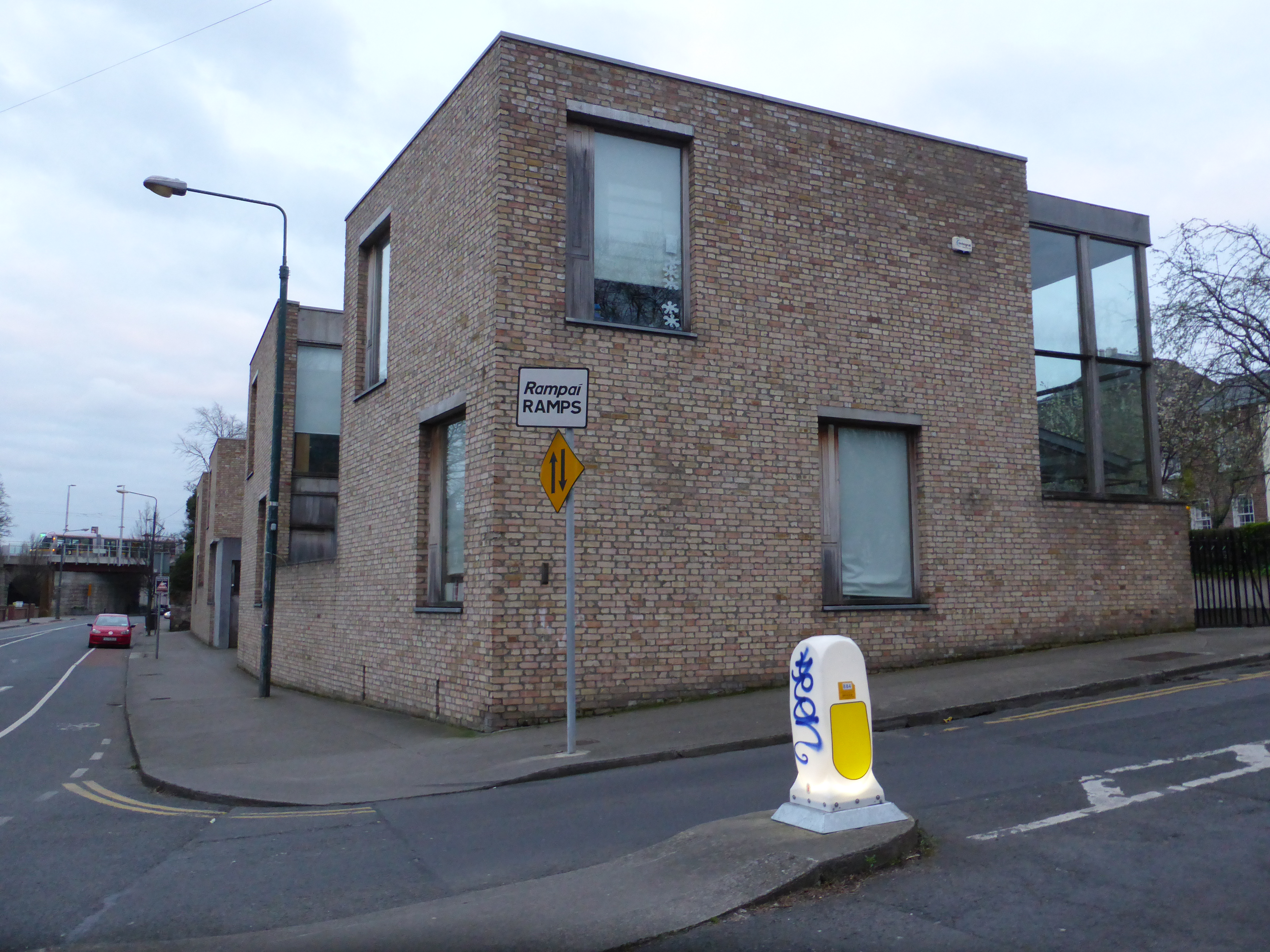
Multidenominational school, Ranelagh, Dublin, for which O'Donnell & Tuomey were nominated for the 6th Mies van der Rohe Award for European Architecture.

Tuomey studied architecture at University College Dublin (UCD), graduating in 1976 and then joining Stirling Wilford & Associates. With them he worked on projects including the Neue Staatsgalerie, Stuttgart. In 1988 he founded In 1991 he was the managing director of Group '91 Architects, who oversaw the transformation of Temple Bar, Dublin.

O'Donnell and Tuomey won the Royal Institute of the Architects of Ireland (RIAI) gold medal twice. According to Architectural League of New York, they are "noted for their expressive form-making, designing buildings that reveal the integrity of their construction and their relationship to the physical and historical context."

Tuomey received a MArch in 2004 and was elected to Aosdána in 2011. He also taught at UCD from 1980 to 2019, and was inaugural Professor of Architectural Design.

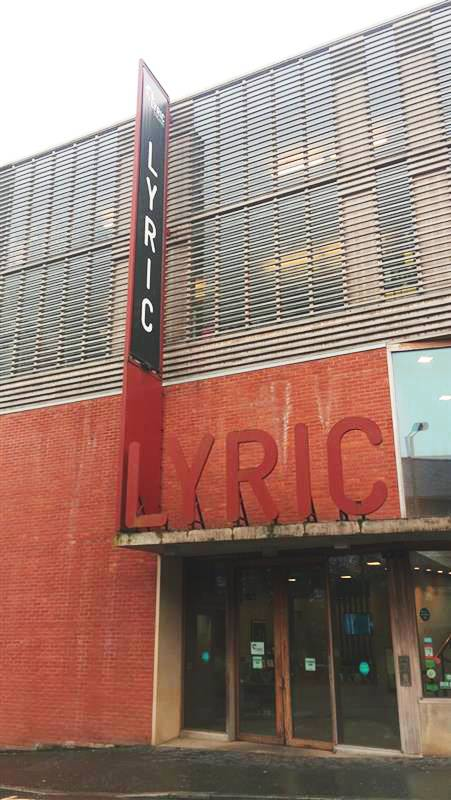
The Lyric Theatre, Belfast, for which O'Donnell & Tuomey won the RIAI gold medal.

== Personal life ==
Tuomey lives in Rathmines with his wife and professional partner Sheila O'Donnell. He has described the stone architecture of the Aran Islands as among Ireland's architectural wonders, and visits them annually.
