= Santissima Annunziata, Turin =

Church in Turin, Italy

Santissima Annunziata
- Chiesa della Santissima Annunziata (Italian)
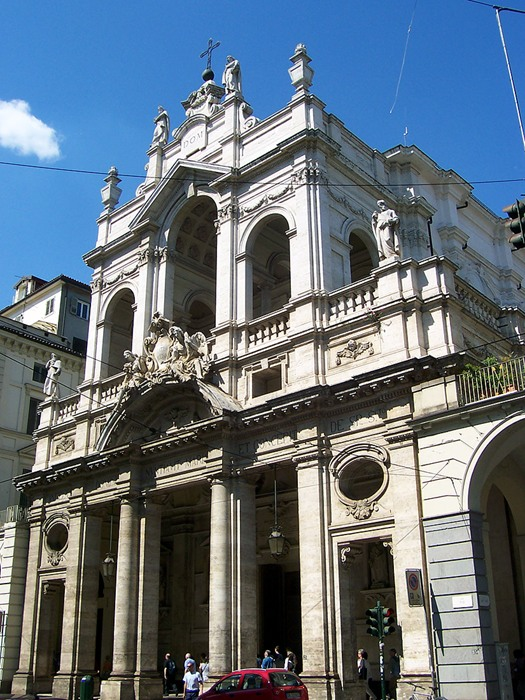
- The church in 2010
- Click on the map for a fullscreen view
- 45°04′00.82″N 7°41′33.32″E
- Location: Turin
- Country: Italy
- Denomination: Roman Catholic

Architecture
- Functional status: Active

Administration
- Diocese: Archdiocese of Turin

Santissima Annunziata (Italian: Chiesa della Santissima Annunziata) is a Roman Catholic church located in Turin, Italy.

== History ==
The original church was built between 1648 and 1656 to a design by Carlo Morello, as part of the development of Via Po during Turin's second urban expansion in the 17th century. The building was subsequently enlarged and modified, including the addition of the main altar designed by Bernardo Vittone in 1743. The façade was completed in 1776, based on a design by Francesco Martinez.

The church was demolished and rebuilt between 1919 and 1932 to a Baroque Revival design by architects Giuseppe and Bartolomeo Gallo. The reconstruction was undertaken in connection with the opening of Via Sant'Ottavio, a new street crossing Via Po, which required the demolition of the earlier 17th-century building.
