= O'Donnell & Tuomey =

Irish architectural firm

- Industry: Architecture
- Founded: 1988
- Founder: Sheila O'Donnell; John Tuomey
- Headquarters: Dublin, Ireland
- Area served: International
- Services: Architecture, Sustainable Design, Interior Design, Urban Design, Planning
- Website: odonnell-tuomey.ie

O'Donnell + Tuomey is an architectural practice based in Dublin, Ireland, described by the authors of Architects Today as one of "the godfathers of contemporary Irish architecture". O'Donnell and Tuomey were the recipients of the 2015 Royal Gold Medal, awarded by the RIBA.

The practice was established in 1988 by Sheila O'Donnell and John Tuomey, who had both previously worked for Stirling Wilford in London. The pair formed part of Group 91 Architects, the masterplanners for the regeneration of Dublin's Temple Bar district in the early 1990s. Both directors teach at University College Dublin and have lectured at schools of architecture in Europe, the UK and US, including Harvard Graduate School of Design, Princeton University, Cambridge University and the AA Architectural Association School of Architecture. In 2010 they were elected Honorary Fellows of the American Institute of Architects. In 2013 the practice received the ICON Architecture Practice of the Year Award.

When asked about their work on the occasion of their Royal Gold Medal ceremony, Tuomey stated: "I fundamentally think that [we believe architecture is] to give shape to everyday routines of society, or to make a society out of those everyday routines. To have a building feel like it's part of the fabric of social life is second nature to us."

In 2025, Sheila O'Donnell and John Tuomey were jointly awarded the Royal Institute of the Architects of Ireland's highest honour, the RIAI Gandon Medal for their "outstanding contribution to architecture in Ireland, the UK and Europe".

== Notable projects ==
The practice's Irish Film Centre and Gallery of Photography projects each won the Downes Medal in 1992 and 1996 respectively. They went on to design a number of other notable buildings, including the Lewis Glucksman Gallery at University College Cork, the Irish installation at the Venice Biennale of Architecture in 2004, and the Ranelagh Multidenominational School, which won the RIAI Triennial Gold Medal in 2000. Five of their projects were shortlisted for the Stirling Prize: the Ranelagh School in 1999, Lewis Glucksman Gallery in 2005, the Lyric Theatre in Belfast in 2011, An Gaeláras Irish Language Centre in 2012, and London School of Economics' Saw Swee Hock Centre in 2014. Their current projects include the V&A East Museum (a branch of London's Victoria and Albert Museum) and Sadler's Wells East Theatre, both located in Stratford.

== Gallery ==
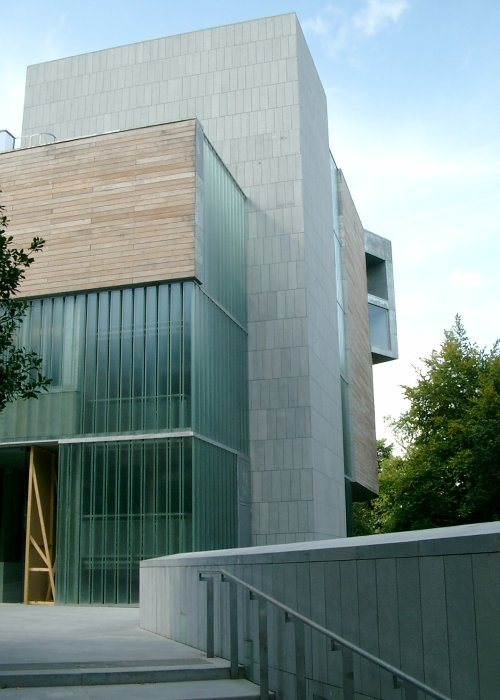
Lewis Glucksman Gallery, Cork (2004)

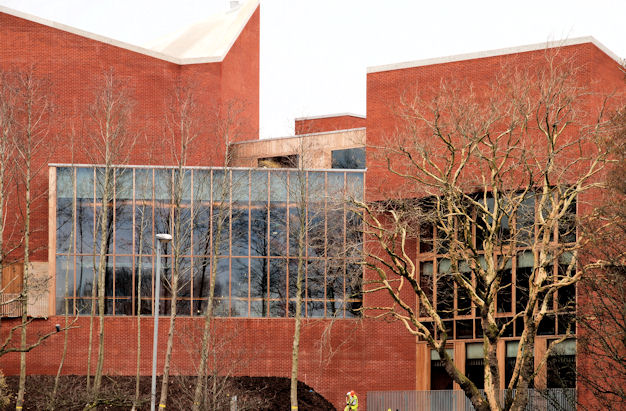
Lyric Theatre, Belfast (2011)

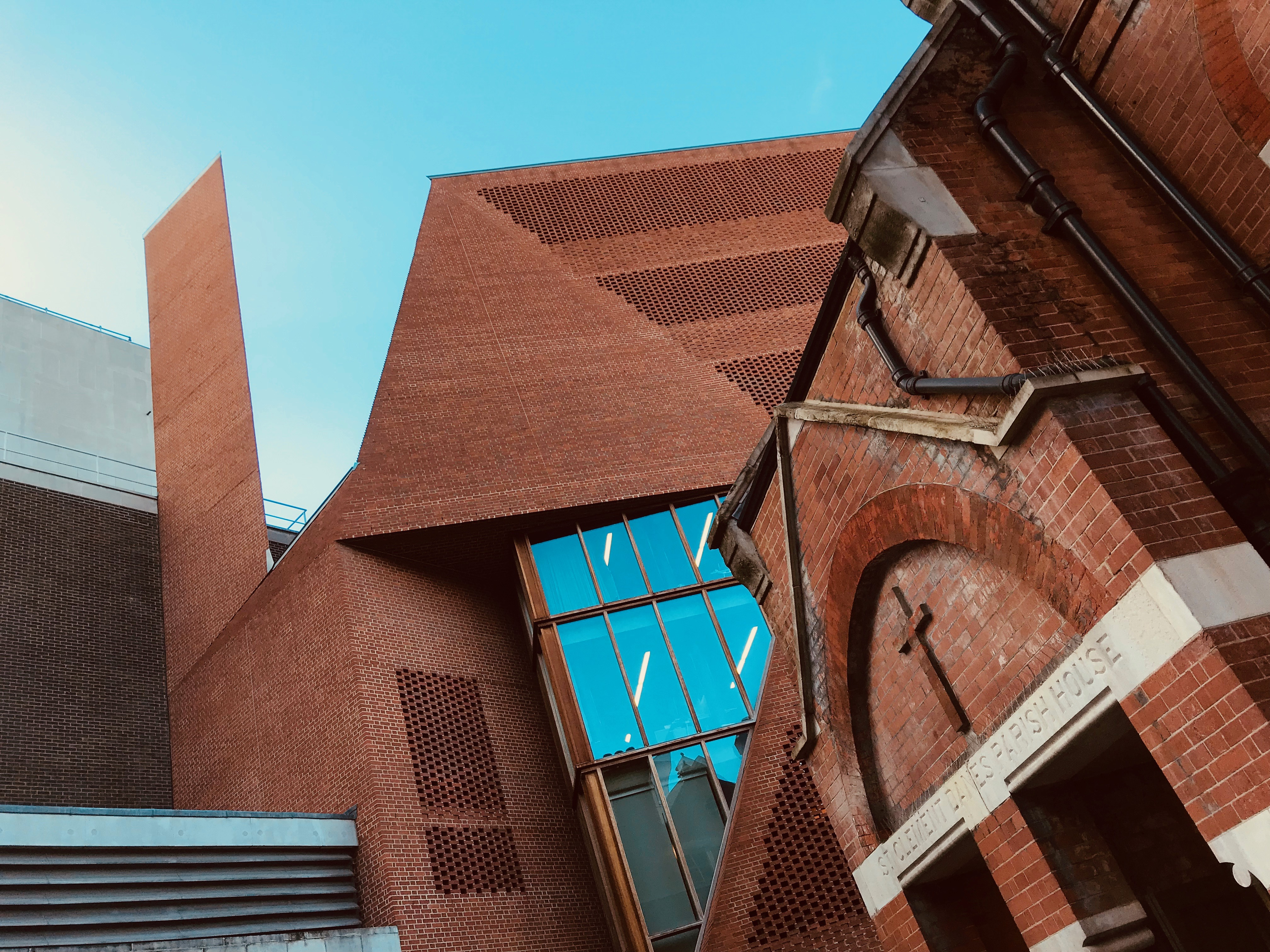
Saw Swee Hock Centre, London School of Economics (2013)

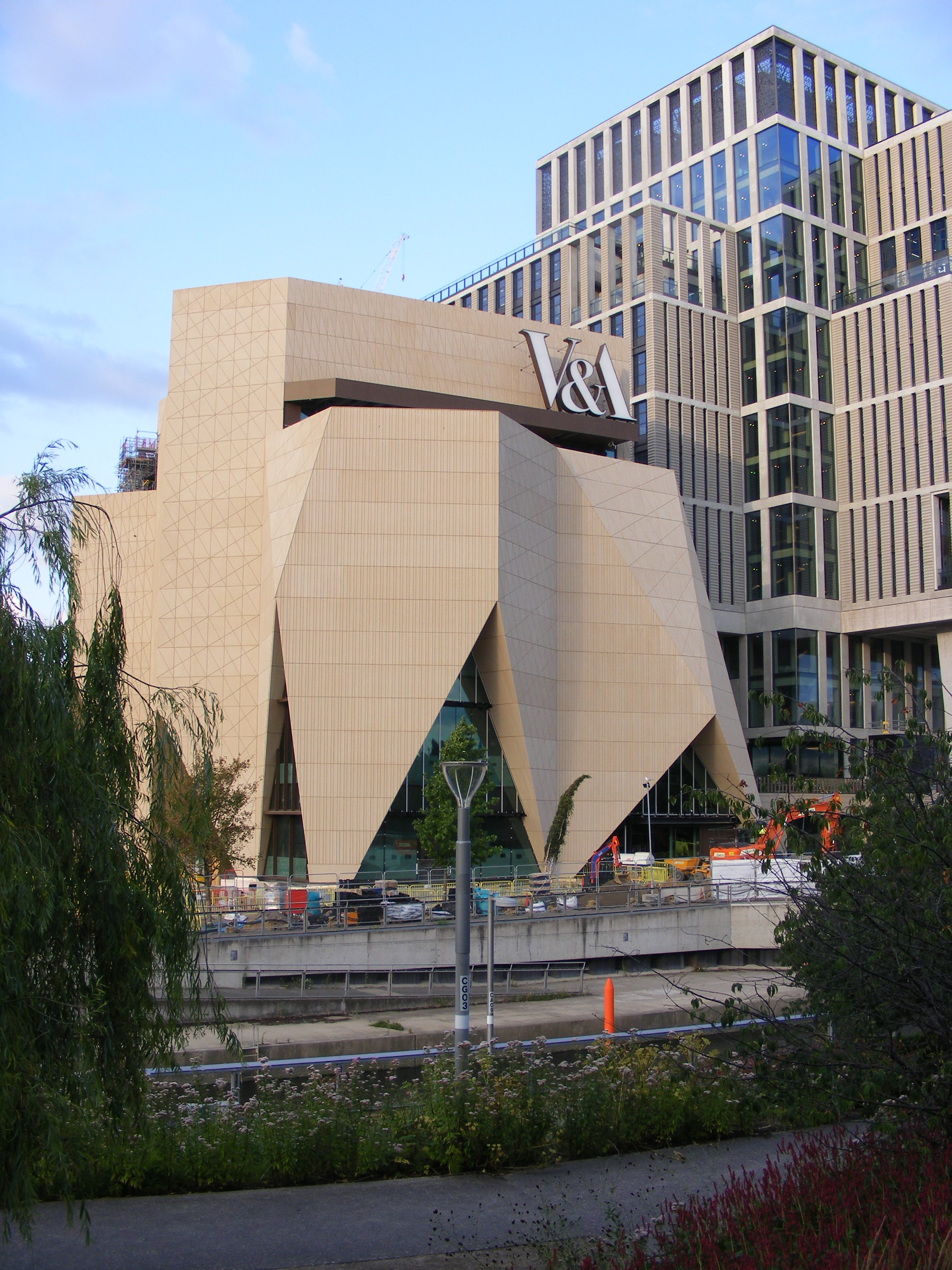
V&A East Museum (pictured under construction in 2023)

== Bibliography ==
- O'Donnell + Tuomey, Princeton Architectural Press, 2006, ISBN 978-1-568-98601-2
