= Piazza Vittorio Veneto =

Coordinates: 45°3′53.203″N 7°41′43.686″E

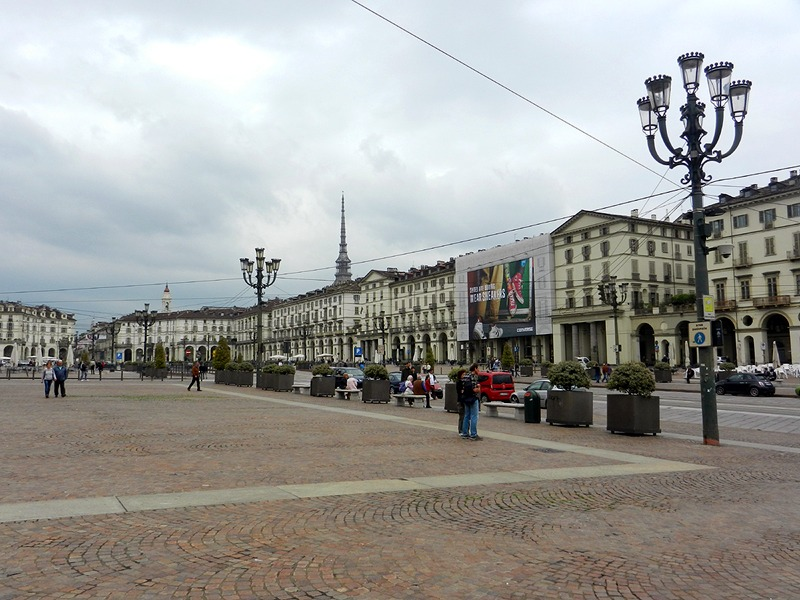
The square

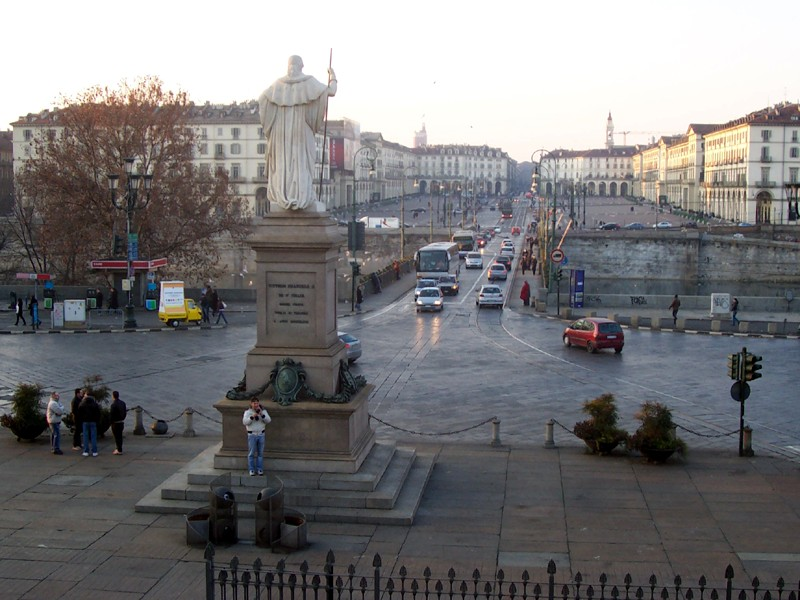
Piazza Vittorio Veneto, seen from Gran Madre di Dio

Piazza Vittorio Veneto, also known as Piazza Vittorio, is a city square in Turin, Italy, which takes its name from the Battle of Vittorio Veneto in 1918. It was formerly known as Piazza Vittorio Emanuele I, after the Savoyard king Victor Emmanuel I.

During the construction of an underground carpark in 2004, workers uncovered 22 skeletons dating from the early 18th century; a study published in 2019 indicates these are almost certainly casualties from the 1706 Siege of Turin.

== Buildings around the square ==
- Borgo Po
- Gran Madre di Dio, Turin
- Ponte Vittorio Emanuele I

== Sources ==
- Mercinelli, Martina; Smith, Martin J (2019). "Fallen Comrades? Anthropological analysis of human remains from the siege of Turin, 1706". Human Remains and Violence. 5 (2): 1–18. doi:10.7227/HRV.5.2.4.
