= List of English Heritage blue plaques in the Royal Borough of Kensington and Chelsea =

This is a complete list of the 195 blue plaques placed by English Heritage and its predecessors in the Royal Borough of Kensington and Chelsea.

At inception in 1876 the scheme was originally administered by the Royal Society of Arts, being taken over by the London County Council (LCC) in 1901. The Greater London Council (GLC) took over the scheme in 1965 from its predecessor. Since the abolition of the GLC in 1986, the blue plaque scheme has been administered by English Heritage.

Subject	Inscription	Location	Year installed	Photo	Open Plaques ref	Notes o
Sir Patrick Abercrombie (1879–1957)	"Pioneer of town and country planning lived here"	Flat 1, 63 Egerton Gardens; Brompton SW3 2BZ	2019		52364	
Sir George Alexander (1858–1919)	"ACTOR MANAGER lived here"	57 Pont Street; Chelsea SW1X 0BD	1951		271	
Field Marshal Viscount Allenby (1861–1936)	"lived here 1928–1936"	24 Wetherby Gardens; South Kensington SW5 0JR	1960		429	
Sir Edwin Arnold (1832–1904)	"Poet and Journalist, Lived and Died here"	31 Bolton Gardens; South Kensington SW5 0AQ	1931		185	
Sir Frederick Ashton (1904–1988)	"Choreographer lived here 1959–1984"	8 Marlborough Street; Chelsea SW3 3PS	2016		41423	
Princess Serafina Astafieva (1876–1934)	"BALLET DANCER lived and taught here 1916–1934"	152 King's Road; Chelsea SW3 3NR	1968		364	
Aubrey House	"Aubrey House stands on the site of Kensington Wells an early 18th century spa Former residents include SIR EDWARD LLOYD RICHARD 1st Earl Grosvenor LADY MARY COKE diarist PETER and CLEMENTIA TAYLOR philanthropists WILLIAM CLEVERLY ALEXANDER art lover"	Aubrey House, Aubrey Walk; Holland Park W8 7JJ	1960		69	
Francis Bacon (artist) (1909–1992)	"Painter lived and worked here 1961–1992"	7 Reece Mews; South Kensington SW7 3HE	2017		43972	
Robert Baden-Powell (1857–1941)	"Chief Scout of the World lived here"	9 Hyde Park Gate; Kensington SW7 5DG	1972		476	
Sir Douglas Bader (1910–1982)	"RAF Fighter Pilot lived here 1955–1982"	5 Petersham Mews; Kensington SW7 5NR	2009		1652	
Enid Bagnold (1889–1981)	"Novelist and Playwright lived here"	29 Hyde Park Gate; Kensington SW7 5DJ	1997		655	
Sir Benjamin Baker (1840–1907)	"Civil Engineer and Designer of the Forth Bridge lived here 1881–1894"	3 Kensington Gate; Kensington W8 5NA	2016		41230	
John Wolfe Barry (1836–1918)	"Civil Engineer lived and died here"	Delahay House, 15 Chelsea Embankment; Chelsea SW3 4LA	2019		52949	
Béla Bartók (1881–1945)	"Hungarian Composer stayed here when performing in London"	7 Sydney Place; South Kensington SW7 3NL	1997		94	
Sir Cecil Beaton (1904–1980)	"Photographer and Designer lived here 1940–1975"	8 Pelham Place; Kensington SW7 2NH	2020		54310	
Samuel Beckett (1906–1989)	"Dramatist and author lived here in 1934"	48 Paultons Square; Chelsea SW3 5DT	2016		41227	a plaque commemorating Patrick Blackett is at the same address.
Sir Max Beerbohm (1872–1956)	"ARTIST AND WRITER born here"	57 Palace Gardens Terrace; Kensington W8 4RU	1969		415	
Gertrude Bell (1868–1926)	"Traveller, archaeologist and diplomat lived here"	95 Sloane Street; Chelsea SW1X 9PQ	2019		52834	
Hilaire Belloc (1870–1953)	"Poet, essayist and historian lived here 1900–1905"	104 Cheyne Walk; Chelsea SW10 0DQ	1973		462	
Arnold Bennett (1867–1931)	"Novelist lived here"	75 Cadogan Square; Chelsea SW1X 0DY	1958		55	
E. F. Benson (1867–1940)	"Writer lived here"	25 Brompton Square; Knightsbridge SW3 2AD	1994		103	
Sir Isaiah Berlin (1909–1997)	"Philosopher and historian of ideas lived here 1922-1928"	33 Upper Addison Gardens; Holland Park W14 8AJ	2022		56999	
Aneurin 'Nye' Bevan and Jennie Lee (1897–1960) (1904–1988)	"Politicians lived here 1944–1954"	23 Cliveden Place; Belgravia SW1W 8HD	2015		40455	
Sir William Beveridge (1879–1963)	"Architect of the Welfare State lived here 1914–1921"	27 Bedford Gardens; Campden Hill W8 7EF	2018		50780	
Patrick Blackett (1897–1974)	"Physicist and Scientific Advisor lived here 1953–1969"	48 Paultons Square; Chelsea SW3 5DT	2016		41228	a plaque commemorating Samuel Beckett is at the same address.
Dorothy Bland (1762–1816)	"Dorothy Bland (Mrs JORDAN) Actress lived here"	30 Cadogan Place; Chelsea SW1X 9RX	1975		4364	
Charles Booth (1840–1916)	"PIONEER IN SOCIAL RESEARCH lived here"	6 Grenville Place; South Kensington SW7 4RW	1951		514	
George Borrow (1803–1881)	"Author Lived Here"	22 Hereford Square; South Kensington SW7 4TS	1911		17	
Bill Brandt (1904–1983)	"Photographer lived here"	4 Airlie Gardens; Campden Hill W8 7AJ	2010		4860	
Frank Bridge (1879–1941)	"Composer and Musician lived here"	4 Bedford Gardens; Holland Park W8 7EB	1989		214	
Benjamin Britten O. M. (1913–1976)	"Composer lived here 1931–1933"	173 Cromwell Road; South Kensington SW5 0SE	2001		211	
Hablot Knight Browne (alias "Phiz") (1815–1882)	"Illustrator of Dickens's novels lived here 1874–1880"	239 Ladbroke Grove; Ladbroke Grove W10 6HG	2001		108	
Sir Marc Isambard Brunel (1769–1849) Isambard Kingdom Brunel (1806–1859)	"civil engineers lived here"	98 Cheyne Walk; Chelsea SW10 0DQ	1954		700	
Sir Edward Burne-Jones (1833–1898)	"Artist lived here 1865–1867"	41 Kensington Square; South Kensington W8 5HP	1998		247	
Prebendary Wilson Carlile (1847–1932)	"Founder of the Church Army lived here"	34 Sheffield Terrace; Holland Park W8 7NA	1972		355	
Howard Carter (1874–1939)	"Egyptologist and discoverer of the tomb of Tutankhamun lived here"	19 Collingham Gardens; South Kensington SW5 0HL	1999		467	
Cetshwayo (c.1832–1884)	"King of the Zulus stayed here in 1882"	18 Melbury Road; Holland Park W14 8LT	2006		243	
Chelsea China and Tobias Smollett (1721–1771)	"CHELSEA CHINA WAS MANUFACTURED IN A HOUSE AT THE NORTH END OF LAWRENCE STREET 1745–1784 TOBIAS SMOLLETT NOVELIST ALSO LIVED IN PART OF THE HOUSE 1750 TO 1762"	16 Lawrence Street; Chelsea SW3 5NE	1950		376	
Gilbert Keith Chesterton (1874–1936)	"POET NOVELIST AND CRITIC lived here"	11 Warwick Gardens; Kensington W14 8PH	1952		365	
Albert Chevalier (1861–1923)	"MUSIC HALL COMEDIAN was born here"	17 St Ann's Villas; Notting Hill W11 4RT	1965		156	
Dame Agatha Christie (1890–1976)	"Detective novelist and playwright lived here 1934–1941"	58 Sheffield Terrace; Holland Park W8 7NA	2001		178	
Sir Winston Churchill O. M. (1874–1965)	"Prime Minister lived and died here"	28 Hyde Park Gate; Kensington SW7 5DJ	1985		138	
Muzio Clementi (1752–1832)	"COMPOSER lived here"	128 Kensington Church Street; Kensington W8 4BH	1963		631	
Wells Coates (1895–1958)	"Architect and Designer lived here 1936–1956"	18 Yeoman's Row; Kensington SW3 2AH	2014		39866	
Sir Henry Cole (1808–1882)	"Campaigner and Educator First Director of the Victoria and Albert Museum lived here"	33 Thurloe Square; South Kensington SW7 2SD	1991		296	
Dame Ivy Compton-Burnett (1884–1969)	"Novelist lived here 1934–1969"	5 Braemar Mansions, Cornwall Gardens; Kensington SW7 4AF	1994		31	
Sir Learie Constantine (1901–1971)	"West Indian Cricketer and Statesman lived here 1949–1954"	101 Lexham Gardens; Earls Court W8 6JN	2013		30549	
Sydney Monckton Copeman (1862–1947)	"Immunologist and developer of smallpox vaccine lived here"	57 Redcliffe Gardens; Chelsea SW10 9JJ	1996		142	
Walter Crane (1845–1915)	"ARTIST lived here"	13 Holland Street; Holland Park W8 4NA	1952		4588	
Sir Stafford Cripps (1899–1952)	"Statesman born here"	32 Elm Park Gardens; Chelsea SW10 4NY	1989		1101	
Colonel R. E. B. Crompton (1845–1940)	"Electrical Engineer lived and worked here 1891–1939"	48 Kensington Court; Kensington W8 5DB	2000		2925	
William Crookes (1832–1919)	"SCIENTIST lived here from 1880 until his death"	7 Kensington Park Gardens; Notting Hill W11 3HB	1967		10128	
Thomas Daniell (1749–1840)	"Topographical Artist lived here"	14 Earls Terrace; Kensington W8 6LP	1999		471	
Elizabeth David (1913–1992)	"Cookery Writer lived and worked here 1947–1992"	24 Halsey Street; Chelsea SW3 2PT	2016		41351	
Evelyn De Morgan (1855–1919) and William De Morgan (1839–1917)	"WILLIAM DE MORGAN CERAMIC ARTIST AND NOVELIST (1839–1917) AND HIS WIFE EVELYN DE MORGAN ARTIST (1855–1919) LIVED & DIED HERE"	127 Old Church Street; Chelsea SW3 6EB	1937		551	
Goldsworthy Lowes Dickinson (1862–1932)	"THIS WAS THE LONDON HOME OF G.LOWES DICKINSON Author and Humanist HE WAS BORN 1862 AND DIED 1932"	11 Edwardes Square; Kensington W8 6HE	1956		675	Erected by private subscription in 1956 and immediately incorporated by the LCC into the official scheme
Sir Charles Wentworth Dilke (1843–1911)	"Statesman and Author lived here"	76 Sloane Street; Brompton SW1X 9SF	1959		23	
Austin Dobson (1840–1911)	"Poet and Essayist lived here"	10 Redcliffe Street; Chelsea SW10 9DT	1959		669	
Frank Dobson (1886–1963)	"Sculptor lived here"	14 Harley Gardens; Chelsea SW10 9SW	1993		369	
George Eliot (1819–1880)	"NOVELIST died here"	4 Cheyne Walk; Chelsea SW3 5QZ	1949		63	
T. S. Eliot O.M. (1888–1965)	"POET lived and died here"	3 Kensington Court Gardens; Kensington W8 5QE	1986		500	
Sir Luke Fildes (1844–1927)	"Artist lived here 1878–1927"	Woodland House, 31 Melbury Road; Holland Park W14 8AB	1959		338	
Admiral Robert Fitzroy (1805–1865)	"Hydrographer and Meteorologist lived here"	38 Onslow Square; Chelsea SW7 3NS	1981		303	
Michael Flanders (1922–1975) Donald Swann (1923–1994)	"Writers and performers of comic songs lived and worked in the garden studio"	1 Scarsdale Villas; Kensington W8 6PT	2018		50394	
Sir Alexander Fleming (1881–1955)	"Discoverer of penicillin lived here"	20a Danvers Street; Chelsea SW3 5AT	1981		70	
Ford Madox Ford (1873–1939)	"Novelist and Critic lived here"	80 Campden Hill Road; Holland Park W8 7AA	1973		341	
Robert Fortune (1812–1880)	"Plant collector lived here 1857–1880"	9 Gilston Road; Chelsea SW10 9SJ	1998		715	
Ugo Foscolo (1778–1827)	"Italian Poet and Patriot lived here 1817–1818"	19 Edwardes Square; Kensington W8 6HE	1998		680	
Henry Watson Fowler (1858–1933)	"Grammarian and Lexicographer lived here 1900–1903"	14 Paultons Square; Chelsea SW3 5AP	2016		42098	
Rosalind Franklin (1920–1958)	"Pioneer of the study of molecular structures including DNA lived here 1951–1958"	Donovan Court, Drayton Gardens; Chelsea SW10 9QS	1992		496	
Sir Charles James Freake (1814–1884)	"Builder and Patron of the Arts lived here"	21 Cromwell Road; South Kensington SW7 2JB	1981		4	
James Anthony Froude (1818–1894)	"HISTORIAN and MAN OF LETTERS Lived here"	5 Onslow Gardens; Chelsea SW7 2JB	1934		195	
Dennis Gabor (1900–1979)	"Physicist and Inventor of Holography lived here"	79 Queen's Gate; Knightsbridge SW7 5JU	2006		536	
Mrs Gaskell (1810–1865)	"Novelist Born Here"	93 Cheyne Walk; Chelsea SW10 0DQ	1913		380	
Gateways Club	"Until 1985 this was the Gateways Club a meeting place for lesbians"	239 King's Road; Chelsea SW3 5EJ	2025		77919	
Martha Gellhorn (1908–1998)	"War Correspondent and Writer lived and worked in a flat here"	72 Cadogan Square; Knightsbridge SW1X 0EA	2019		52127	
Sir W. S. Gilbert (1836–1911)	"Dramatist Lived here"	39 Harrington Gardens; South Kensington SW7 4JU	1929		208	
George Gissing (1857–1903)	"Novelist lived here 1882–1884"	33 Oakley Gardens; Chelsea SW3 5QH	1975		32	
George Godwin (1813–1888)	"Architect, Journalist and Social Reformer lived here"	24 Alexander Square; South Kensington SW3 2AU	1969		1095	
Grace Wyndham Goldie (1900–1986)	"BBC executive and pioneer of political coverage on television lived in Flat 86 from 1935"	Flat 86 St Mary Abbot’s Court, Warwick Gardens; Kensington W14 8PH	2022		57588	
Kenneth Grahame (1859–1932)	"Author of "THE WIND IN THE WILLOWS" lived here 1901–1908"	16 Phillimore Place; Holland Park W8 7BU	1959		9622	
Percy Grainger (1882–1961)	"Australian Composer Folklorist and Pianist lived here"	31 King's Road; Chelsea SW3 4RP	1988		4736	
Christine Granville born Krystyna Skarbek (1908–1952)	"SOE Agent lived here 1949-1952"	1 Lexham Gardens; South Kensington W8 5JL	2020		54199	
Walter Greaves (1846–1930)	"Artist lived here 1855–1897"	104 Cheyne Walk; Chelsea SW10 0DQ	1973		2127	
Hugh Carleton Greene (1910–1987)	"Journalist and Director-General of the BBC lived here 1956–1967"	25 Addison Avenue; Holland Park London W11 4QS	2018		49260	
Joyce Grenfell (1910–1979)	"Entertainer and Writer lived here in flat No.8 1957–1979"	34 Elm Park Gardens; Chelsea SW10 9NZ	2003		1100	
François Guizot (1787–1874)	"French Politician and historian lived here 1848–1849"	21 Pelham Crescent; South Kensington SW7 2NR	2001		1094	
King Haakon VII (1872–1957)	"KING HAAKON VII 1872–1957 led the Norwegian government-in-exile here 1940–1945"	10 Palace Green; Kensington W8 4QA	2005		171	The building is the official residence of the Ambassador of Norway.
Adelaide Hall (1901-1993)	"Singer lived here"	1 Collingham Road; South Kensington SW5 0NT	2024		61784	
Radclyffe Hall (1880–1943)	"Novelist and Poet lived here 1924–1929"	7 Holland Street; Kensington W8 4LX	1992		198	
Tony Hancock (1924–1968)	"Comedian lived here 1952–1958"	20 Queen's Gate Place; South Kensington SW7 5NY	2014		30758	
Joseph Aloysius Hansom (1803–1882)	"Architect, founder-editor of The Builder and inventor of the Hansom Cab lived here"	27 Sumner Place; Chelsea SW7 3NT	1980		113	
Sir Edward Henry (1850–1931)	"Metropolitan Police Commissioner 1903–1918 and Pioneer of Fingerprint Identification lived here 1903–1920"	19 Sheffield Terrace; Holland Park W8 7NQ	2001		422	
Philip Arnold Heseltine (a.k.a. Peter Warlock) (1894–1930)	"Composer lived here"	30 Tite Street; Chelsea SW3 4JA	1984		56	
Sir Alfred Hitchcock (1899–1980)	"Film Director lived here 1926–1939"	153 Cromwell Road; South Kensington SW5 0TQ	1999		35	
William Holman-Hunt O. M. (1827–1910)	"Painter Lived and died here"	18 Melbury Road; Holland Park W14 8LT	1923		243	
William Henry Hudson (1880–1922)	""THE HOUSE WHERE I WAS BORN IN THE SOUTH AMERICAN PAMPAS... W.H.HUDSON." HUDSON'S FRIENDS SOCIETY OF QUILMES, NEAR BUENOS AIRES, WHERE THE GREAT WRITER WAS BORN ON AUGUST 4TH 1841, AND WHERE HE SPENT HIS YOUTH, HAS PLACED THIS BRONZE TABLET AT 40 SAINT LUKE'S ROAD, LONDON, THE HOUSE IN WHICH HUDSON LIVED HIS LAST YEARS, AND DIED ON AUGUST 18, 1922"	40 St Luke's Road; Westbourne Park W11 1DH	1938		33149	
Leigh Hunt (1784–1859)	"Essayist & Poet Lived Here"	22 Upper Cheyne Row; Chelsea SW3 5JN	1905		153	
John Ireland (1879–1962)	"Composer lived here"	14 Gunter Grove; Chelsea SW10 0UN	1996		51	
Henry James (1843–1916)	"WRITER lived here 1886–1902"	34 De Vere Gardens; Kensington W8 5AQ	1949		689	
Earl Jellicoe O. M. (1859–1935)	Admiral of the Fleet EARL JELLICOE O.M. 1859–1935 lived here"	25 Draycott Place; Chelsea SW3 2SH	1975		120	
Jerome K. Jerome (1859–1927)	"Author Wrote Three Men in a Boat while living here at flat 104"	91–104 Chelsea Gardens, Chelsea Bridge Road; Chelsea SW1W 8RQ	1989		7617	
Jinnah (a.k.a. Quaid i Azam) (1876–1948)	"founder of Pakistan stayed here in 1895"	35 Russell Road; Holland Park W14 8HU	1955		1289	
Augustus John (1878–1861)	"This house was built for AUGUSTUS JOHN 1878–1961 Painter"	28 Mallord Street; Chelsea SW3 6DU	1981		9887	
James Joyce (1882–1941)	"Author lived here in 1931"	28 Campden Grove; Holland Park W8 4JQ	1994		8679	
Charles Kingsley (1819–1875)	"Writer lived here"	56 Old Church Street; Chelsea SW3 5BD	1979		540	
Louis Kossuth (1802–1894)	"Hungarian Patriot stayed here"	39 Chepstow Villas; Notting Hill W11 3DP	1959		342	
Edward McKnight Kauffer and Marion Dorn (1890–1954) (1896–1964)	"Designers lived here in flats 139/141"	Swan Court, Chelsea Manor Street; Chelsea SW3 5RT	2015		39683	
Sir Osbert Lancaster (1908–1986)	"Cartoonist and Writer was born here"	79 Elgin Crescent; Notting Hill W11 2JE	2015		39818	
Andrew Lang (1844–1912)	"Man of letters lived here in 1876-1912"	1 Marloes Road; Kensington W8 6LQ	1959		596	
Lillie Langtry (1853–1929)	"Actress lived here"	21 Pont Street (now the Cadogan Hotel); Chelsea SW1X 9SG	1980		422	
Lansdowne House	"In these studios lived and worked the artists CHARLES RICKETTS 1866–1931 CHARLES SHANNON 1863–1937 GLYN PHILPOT 1863–1937 VIVIAN FORBES 1891–1937 JAMES PRYDE 1866–1941 and F.CAYLEY ROBINSON 1862–1927"	Lansdowne House, Lansdowne Road; Notting Hill W11 2LT	1979		127	
Sir John Lavery (1856–1941)	"Painter lived here 1899–1940"	5 Cromwell Place; South Kensington SW7 2JE	1966		621	
Andrew Bonar Law (1858–1923)	"Prime Minister lived here"	24 Onslow Gardens; South Kensington SW7 3AL	1958		206	
W. E. H. Lecky (1838–1903)	"Historian and Essayist lived and died here"	38 Onslow Gardens; Chelsea SW7 3PY	1955		640	
Frederic Leighton, 1st Baron Leighton (1830–1896)	"Painter lived and died here"	Leighton House, 12 Holland Park Road; Holland Park W14 8LZ	1958		389	
Percy Wyndham Lewis (1882–1957)	"Painter and Writer lived here"	61 Palace Gardens Terrace; Kensington W8 4RU	1983		637	
Jenny Lind (a.k.a. Madame Goldschmidt) (1820–1887)	"Singer Lived Here"	189 Old Brompton Road; South Kensington SW5 OBA	1909		674	
Sir Norman Lockyer (1836–1920)	"Astronomer, Physicist and Founder of Nature lived here 1876–1920"	16 Penywern Road; Earls Court SW5 9ST	2003		460	
David Low (1891–1963)	"Cartoonist lived here at No. 33"	Melbury Court, Kensington High Street; Kensington W8 6NH	1991		383	
Stéphane Mallarmé (1842–1898)	"Poet stayed here in 1863"	6 Brompton Square; Knightsbridge SW3 2AA	1959		435	
Bob Marley (1945–1981)	"Singer and Songwriter lived here in 1977"	42 Oakley Street; Chelsea SW7 5HA	2019		52362	
Baron Carlo Marochetti (1805–1867)	"Sculptor lived here 1851–1867"	32 Onslow Square; Kensington SW7 3NS	2010		2734	
James Clerk Maxwell (1831–1879)	"Physicist lived here"	16 Palace Gardens Terrace; Kensington W8 4RP	1923		9621	
Phil May (1864–1903)	"Artist lived and worked here"	20 Holland Park Road; Holland Park W14 8LZ	1982		982	
Dame Maud McCarthy (1858–1949)	"Army Matron-in-Chief lived here 1919-1945"	47 Markham Square; Chelsea SW3 4XA	2014		33084	
George Meredith O. M. (1828–1909)	"Poet and novelist lived here"	7 Hobury Street; Chelsea SW10 0JP	1976		10028	
John Stuart Mill (1806–1873)	"Philosopher Lived Here"	18 Kensington Square; South Kensington W8 5HH	1907		2929	
Sir John Everett Millais P.R.A (1829–1896)	"PAINTER Lived and died here"	2 Palace Gate; Kensington W8 5NF	1926		31138	
A. A. Milne (1882–1956)	"Author lived here"	13 Mallord Street; Chelsea SW3 6DT	1979		8652	
Charles Morgan (1894–1958)	"Novelist and Critic lived and died here"	16 Campden Hill Square; Holland Park W8 7JY	1992		4966	
John Pierpont Morgan (1837–1913) and Junius S. Morgan (1813–1890)	"International Bankers lived here"	14 Princes Gate, Kensington Gore; Kensington SW7 1PU	2004		4304	
iris Murdoch (1919-1999)	"Novelist and Philosopher lived here in flat 5"	29 Cornwall Gardens; South Kensington SW7 4AP	2024		60793	
Sir Archibald McIndoe (1900–1960)	"Reconstructive Surgeon lived here in flat 14"	Avenue Court, Draycott Avenue; Chelsea SW3 3BU	2000		4362	
Jawaharlal Nehru (1889–1964)	"First Prime Minister of India lived here in 1910 and 1912"	60 Elgin Crescent; Notting Hill W11 2JJ	1989		363	
Sir Henry Newbolt (1862–1938)	"Poet lived here"	29 Campden Hill Road; Holland Park W8 7DX	1994		62	
Rudolf Nureyev (1938–1993)	"Ballet Dancer lived here"	27 Victoria Road; Kensington W8 5RF	2017		43811	
Sir William Orpen (1878–1931)	"Painter lived here"	8 South Bolton Gardens; South Kensington SW5 0DH	1978		611	
Samuel Palmer (1805–1881)	"Artist lived here 1851–1861"	6 Douro Place; Kensington W8 5PH	1972		375	
Emmeline Pankhurst (1858–1928) and Dame Christabel Pankhurst (1880–1958)	"Campaigners for Women's Suffrage lived here"	50 Clarendon Road; Notting Hill W11 3AD	2006		582	
Sylvia Pankhurst (1882–1960)	"Campaigner for Women's Rights lived here"	120 Cheyne Walk; Chelsea SW10 0ES	1985		473	
Hubert Parry (1848–1918)	"MUSICIAN lived here"	17 Kensington Square; Kensington W8 5HH	1949		329	
Walter Pater (1839–1894)	"Aesthete and Writer lived and worked here 1885–1893"	12 Earls Terrace; Kensington W8 6LP	2004		401	
Cecilia Payne-Gaposchkin (1900–1979)	"Astronomer lived here in her youth"	70 Lansdowne Road; Notting Hill W11 2LR	2026		83131	
Mervyn Peake (1911–1979)	"Author and Artist lived here 1960–1968"	1 Drayton Gardens; Chelsea SW10 9RL	1996		387	
Francis Place (1771–1854)	"Political Reformer lived here 1833–1851"	21 Brompton Square; Knightsbridge SW3 2AD	1961		605	
Sir Nigel Playfair (1874–1934)	"Actor-Manager lived here"	26 Pelham Crescent; South Kensington SW7 2NR	1965		574	
Ezra Pound (1885–1972)	"Poet lived here 1909–1914"	10 Kensington Church Walk; Holland Park W8 4NB	2004		302	
Count Edward Raczynski (1891–1993)	"Polish Statesman Lived here 1967–1993"	8 Lennox Gardens; Brompton SW1X 0DG	2004		267	
John Rae (1813–1893)	"Arctic Explorer lived and died here"	4 Lower Addison Gardens; Holland Park W14 8BQ	2011		7405	
Dame Marie Rambert (1888–1982)	"Founder of Ballet Rambert lived here"	19 Campden Hill Gardens; Holland Park W8 7AX	1997		566	
Sir William Ramsay (1852–1916)	"Chemist Discoverer of the Noble Gases lived here 1887–1902"	12 Arundel Gardens; Notting Hill W11 2LA	2011		5858	
Arthur Ransome (1884–1967)	"Author of Swallows and Amazons lived here 1904–1905"	1 Gunter Grove; Chelsea SW10 0UJ	2021		54961	
Sir Terence Rattigan (1911–1977)	"Playwright was born here"	100 Cornwall Gardens; Kensington SW7 4BQ	2005		229	
Jean Rhys (1890–1979)	"Writer lived here in Flat 22 1936–1938"	Paultons House, Paultons Square; Chelsea SW3 5DU	2012		33140	
George Robinson, 1st Marquess of Ripon (1827–1909)	"George Frederick Samuel Robinson, Marquess of Ripon, Viceroy of India lived here"	9 Chelsea Embankment; Chelsea SW3 4LE	1959		83	
Joan Robinson (1903–1983)	"Economist lived here"	44 Kensington Park Gardens; Notting Hill W11 2QT,	1959		60035	
Dante Gabriel Rossetti (1828–1882) and Algernon Charles Swinburne (1837–1909)	"lived here"	16 Cheyne Walk; Chelsea SW3 5RA	1949		505	
Sir William Rothenstein (1872–1945)	"Painter and Writer lived here 1899–1902"	1 Pembroke Cottages, Edwardes Square; Kensington W8 6HE	2000		487	
Eugen Sandow (1867–1925)	"Body-Builder and Promoter of Physical Culture lived and died here"	161 Holland Park Avenue; Holland Park W11 4UX	2009		362	
Sir Malcolm Sargent (1895–1967)	"Conductor lived and died in a flat in this building"	Albert Hall Mansions, Kensington Gore; Kensington SW7 2AN	1992		126	
John F. Sartorius (c.1775-c.1830)	"SPORTING PAINTER lived here 1807–1812"	155 Old Church Street; Chelsea SW3 6EB	1963		43	
Siegfried Sassoon (1886–1967)	"Writer lived here 1925–1932"	23 Campden Hill Square; Holland Park W8 7JY	1996		265	
Robert Falcon Scott (1868–1912)	"ANTARCTIC EXPLORER lived here"	56 Oakley Street; Chelsea SW3 5HB	1935		668	
Lao She (1899–1966)	"Chinese writer lived here 1925–1928"	31 St James's Gardens; Notting Hill W11 4RE	2003		57	
Jean Sibelius (1865–1957)	"Composer lived here in 1909"	15 Gloucester Walk; Holland Park W8 4HZ	1995		635	
Sir John Simon (1816–1904)	"Pioneer of Public Health lived here"	40 Kensington Square; Kensington W8 5HP	1959		125	
Maharajah Duleep Singh (1838–1893)	"Last Ruler of Lahore lived here 1881–1886"	53 Holland Park; Holland Park W11 3RS	2005		92	
Lady Diana Spencer (1961–1997)	"Later Princess of Wales, lived here 1979–1981"	60 Coleherne Court; Old Brompton Road; Earl's Court SW5 0EF	2021		55866	
Sir Charles Stanford (1852–1924)	"Musician lived here 1894–1916"	56 Hornton Street; Holland Park W8 4NU	1961		556	
Howard Staunton (1810–1874)	"British World Chess Champion lived here 1871–1874"	117 Lansdowne Road; Notting Hill W11 2LF	1999		533	
Philip Wilson Steer (1860–1942)	"PAINTER lived and died here"	109 Cheyne Walk; Chelsea SW10 0DJ	1967		135	
Sir Leslie Stephen (1832–1904)	"Scholar and writer lived here"	22 Hyde Park Gate; Kensington SW7 5DH	1960		91	
Bram Stoker (1847–1912)	"Author of Dracula lived here"	18 St Leonard's Terrace; Chelsea SW3 4QG	1977		396	
Marcus Stone (1840–1921)	"Artist lived here 1877–1921"	8 Melbury Road; Holland Park W14 8LN	1994		692	
John McDouall Stuart (1815–1866)	"First Explorer to cross Australia lived and died here"	9 Campden Hill Square; Holland Park W8 9LB	1962		191	
Dame Ellen Terry (1847–1928)	"ACTRESS lived here"	22 Barkston Gardens; Earls Court SW5 0ER	1951		634	
William Makepeace Thackeray (1811–1863)	"NOVELIST LIVED HERE"	2 Palace Green; Kensington W8 4QB	1887		527	2 Palace Green is now the Embassy of Israel, London. Photography is generally prohibited; the taking of this photograph was authorised by an on-duty police officer on the day.
William Makepeace Thackeray (1811–1863)	"Novelist Lived Here 1854–1862"	36 Onslow Square; Chelsea SW7 3NS	1912		10052	
William Makepeace Thackeray (1811–1863)	"Novelist Lived Here"	16 Young Street; Kensington W8 5EH	1905		3724	
Benjamin Thompson, Count Rumford (1753–1814)	"Inventor and Adventurer lived here"	168 Brompton Road; Knightsbridge SW3 1HW	1999		633	
Dame Sybil Thorndike (1882–1976)	"Actress lived here 1921–1932"	6 Carlyle Square; Chelsea SW3 6EX	1998		33	
Sir Hamo Thornycroft (1850–1925)	"Sculptor lived here"	2b Melbury Road; Holland Park W14 8LP	1957		168	
P. L. Travers (1899–1996)	"Author of Mary Poppins Lived and worked here 1946-1962"	50 Smith Street; Chelsea SW3 4EP	2018		49439	
Sir Herbert-Beerbohm Tree (1853–1917)	"ACTOR-MANAGER lived here"	31 Rosary Gardens; South Kensington SW7 4NH	1950		333	
Samuel L. Clemens "Mark Twain" (1835-1910)	"American Writer lived here in 1896-7"	23 Tedworth Square; Chelsea SW3 4DR	1910		256	
John Tweed (1869–1933)	"Sculptor lived here"	108 Cheyne Walk; Chelsea SW10 0DJ	1985		494	
Evelyn Underhill (1875–1941)	"Christian philosopher and teacher Lived here 1907–1939"	50 Campden Hill Square; Holland Park W8 7JR	1990		81	
Chaim Weizmann (1874–1952)	"Scientist and Statesman First President of the State of Israel lived here"	67 Addison Road; Holland Park W14 8JL	1980		340	
Elisabeth Welch (1904–2003)	"Singer lived here in Flat 1"	Ovington Court, Ovington Gardens, off Brompton Road; Kensington SW3 1LB	2012		9482	
James Abbott McNeill Whistler (1834–1903)	"Painter and Etcher Lived here"	96 Cheyne Walk; Chelsea SW10 0DQ	1925		203	
William Wilberforce (1759–1833)	"Opponent of Slavery died here"	44 Cadogan Place; Chelsea, SW1X 9RU	1961		96	
Jane Francesca, Lady Wilde "Speranza" (1821–1901)	"Poet and Essayist lived here 1887–1896"	87 Oakley Street; Chelsea SW3 5NP	2000		493	
Oscar Wilde (1854–1900)	"Wit and dramatist lived here"	34 Tite Street; Chelsea SW3 4JA	1954		287	
Asquith Xavier (1820–1980)	"Railway guard who stood up to workplace racial discrimination lived here"	149 Ledbury Road; Notting Hill W11 1HR	2026		89929	

== See also ==
- List of English Heritage blue plaques in London
