= Addison Avenue =

Street in London, England

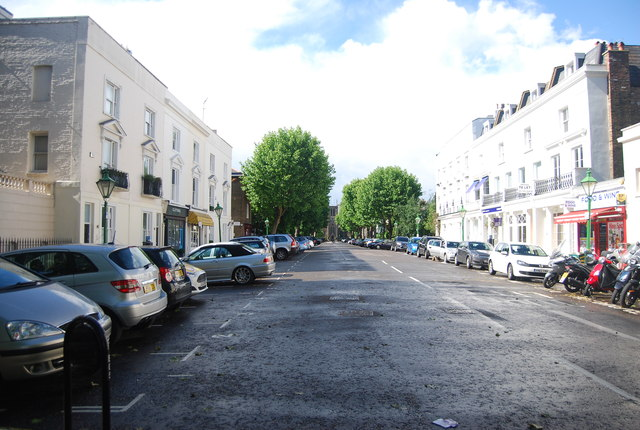
- Looking northwards along Addison Avenue
- Interactive map of Addison Avenue
- Namesake: Joseph Addison (1672–1719), essayist and statesman
- Type: Street
- Area: Holland Park
- Location: Royal Borough of Kensington and Chelsea, London, England
- Postal code: W11
- Nearest metro station: Holland Park tube station
- Coordinates: 51.50246°N 0.20932°W
- North: St James's Gardens, St James' Church
- East: Norland Square
- South: Holland Park Avenue, Addison Road
- West: Royal Crescent

Construction
- Construction start: 1840s

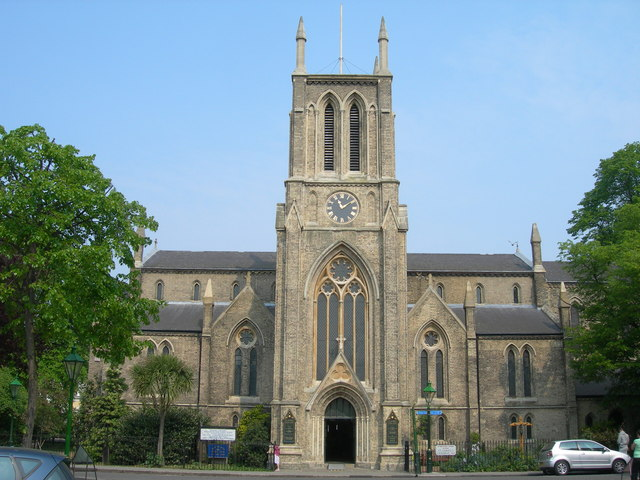
St James' Church, Norlands at the northern end of the street

Addison Avenue is a street in the Notting Hill area of London. Located in the Royal Borough of Kensington and Chelsea, it runs northwards from Holland Park Avenue to St James's Gardens and St James' Church, crossing Queensdale Road about halfway along. Norland Square is located to its east while Royal Crescent is a little way to the west. A broad, tree-lined avenue, it is largely residential with some commercial properties at the southern end. The smaller Addison Place mews street runs off the western side of the road, looping northwards until it meets Queensdale Road. Addison Avenue is in the wealthy London area of Holland Park.

The street, like nearby Addison Road to the south, is named after the early 18th-century writer and politician Joseph Addison who lived at nearby Holland House. The Holland Estate was gradually redeveloped for housing although Addison Avenue was actually built on the adjacent Norland Estate. It was developed during the 1840s by the architect and property developer Robert Cantwell. It was designed with a vista towards St James' Church at the northern end of the street, which was built at the same time.

A number of buildings in the street are now Grade II listed, including all those north of Queensdale Road. The houses in the northern part of the street are attributed to F.W. Stent. The street is part of the Norland Conservation Area, designated in 1969.

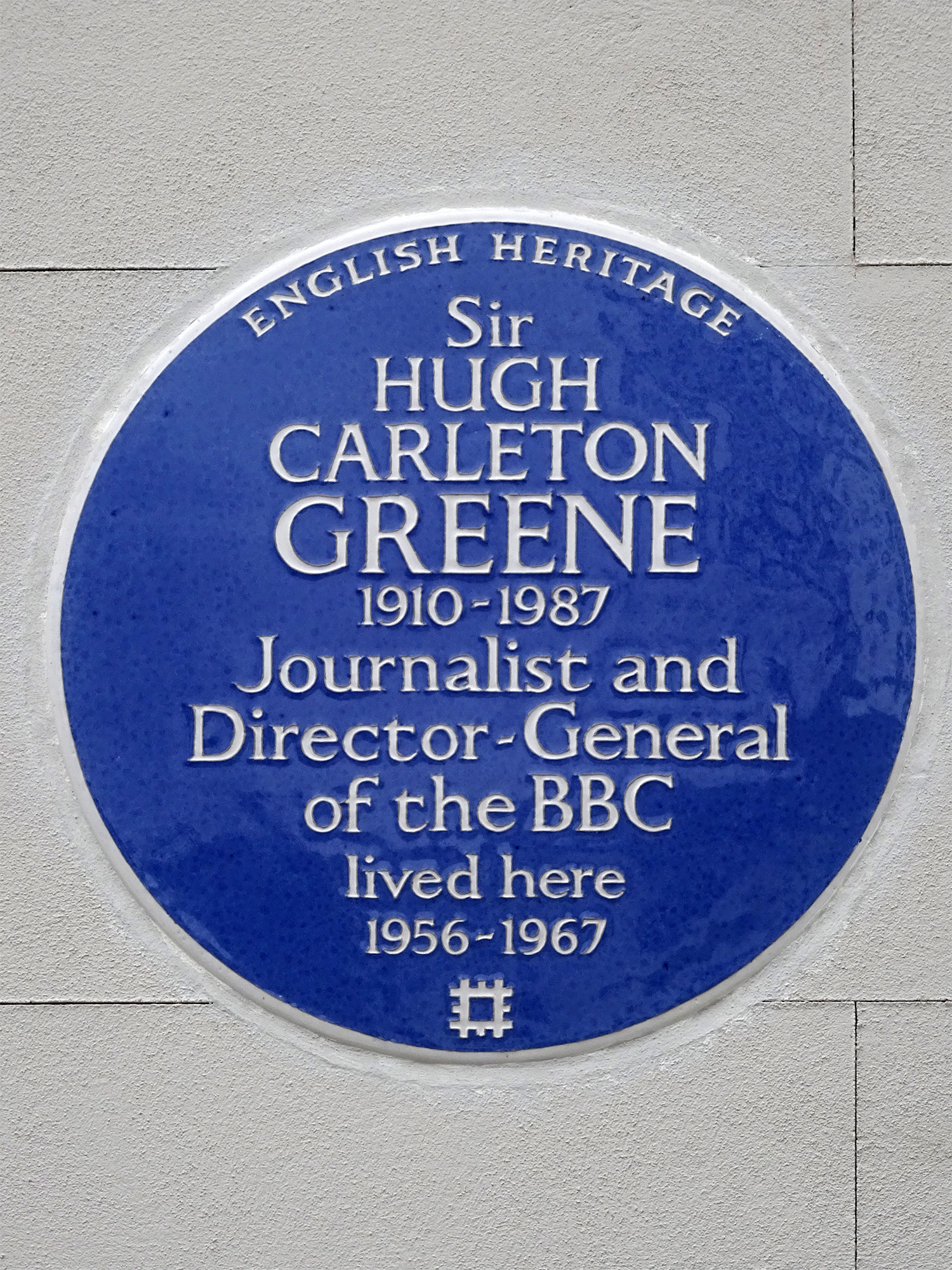
Blue plaque commemorating Hugh Carleton Greene, Director-General of the BBC

Among the notable former residents was Hugh Carleton Greene (1910–1987), Director-General of the BBC during the 1960s, who is now commemorated by a blue plaque.

In 2023 the "Friends of Pauline Boty" unveiled their own blue plaque for Pauline Boty.

== See also ==
- Addison Road, nearby street
- Addison's Walk, Oxford
- St Ann's Villas, nearby street

== Bibliography ==
- Bebbington, Gillian. London Street Names. Batsford, 1972.
- Cherry, Bridget & Pevsner, Nikolaus. London 3: North West. Yale University Press, 2002.
- Curl, James Stevens. Victorian Architecture. David & Charles, 1990.
- Hibbert, Christopher Weinreb, Ben, Keay, John & Keay, Julia. The London Encyclopaedia. Pan Macmillan, 2011.
