= Thomas Marquois =

English military instructor

Thomas Marquois (died 1802) was a London-based military instructor for the sons of the English gentry in the 18th century.

== Career ==
From 1761 to 1765, Marquois was Professor of Artillery and Fortification in Holland Park. He taught the sons of the English gentry who were destined to serve in the British Army.

In 1780, Marquois designed the Marquois scales, used for military surveying.

== Personal life ==
Marquois was a Huguenot. In 1761, he became the first person to lease land in Holland Park from Edward Burnaby Greene off Holland Park Avenue, from Portland Road to Norland Square.

== Death ==
Marquois died in 1802.
