= St Ann's Villas =

Street in London, England

Coordinates: 51.50699°N 0.21486°W

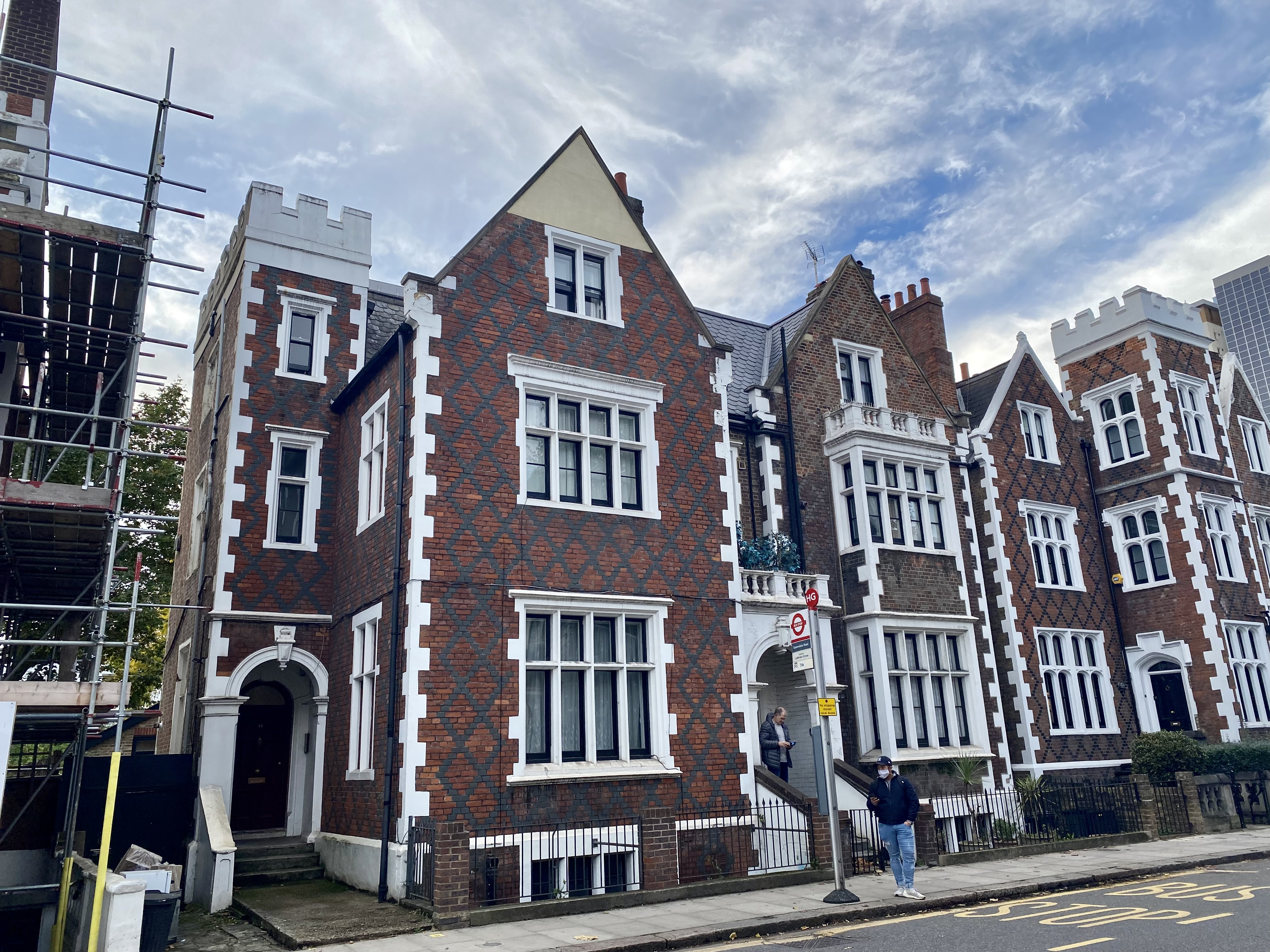
Buildings in the Tudor Gothic style.

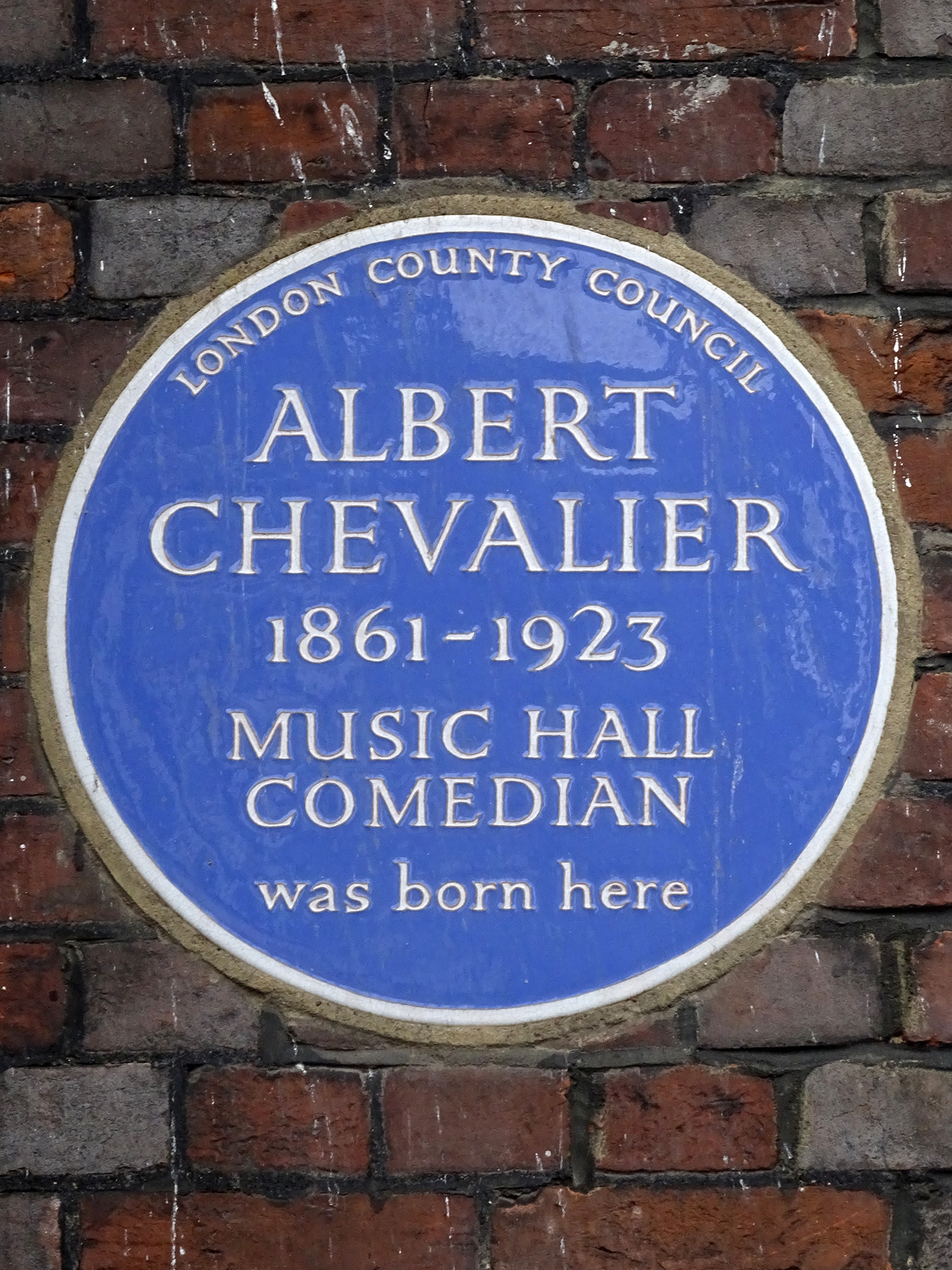
Blue plaque for the music hall star Albert Chevalier who was born in the street.

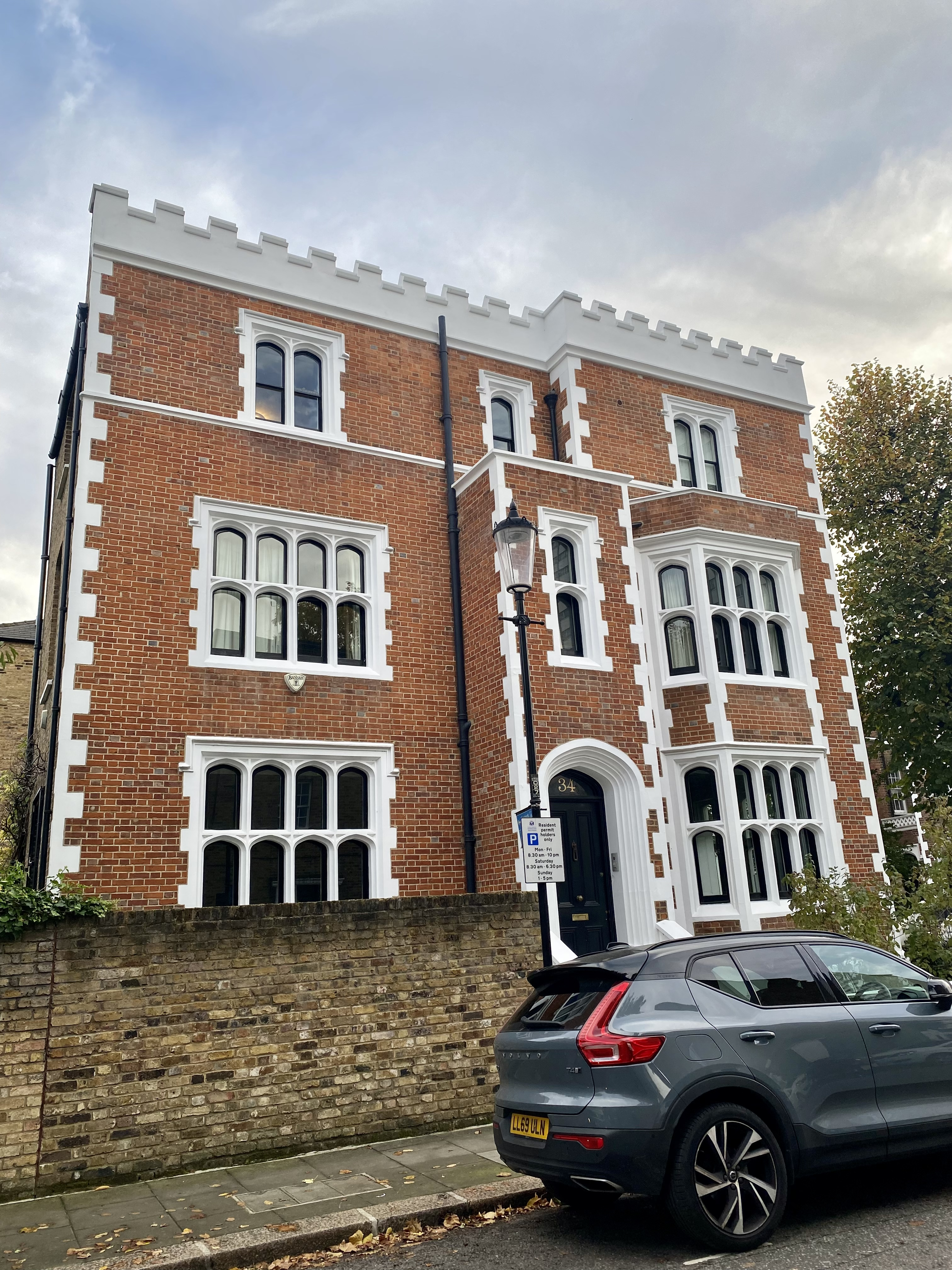

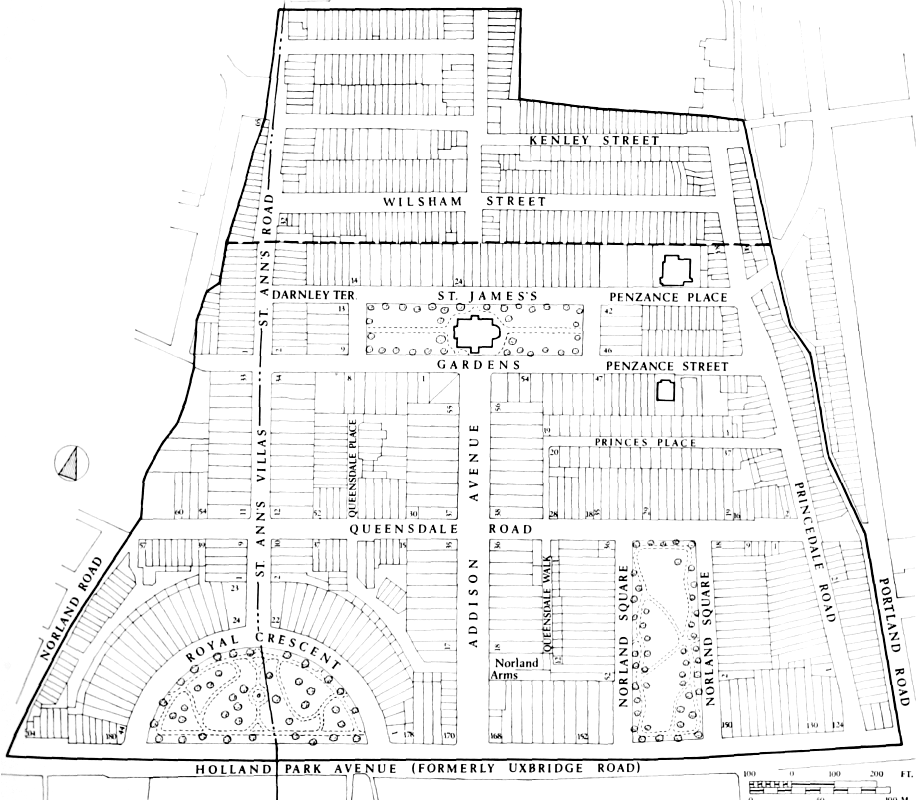
Map of the Norland Estate.

St Ann's Villas (also written as St Anns Villas) is a street in the Notting Hill area of London. Located in the Royal Borough of Kensington and Chelsea, it runs northwards from Royal Crescent. It is intersected by Queensdale Road.

The land was part of the Norland Estate which was redeveloped in the early Victorian era into affluent housing for the expanding population of London. Addison Avenue and Norland Square were both laid out around the same time as St Ann's Villas. The barrister and former Member of Parliament for Penryn Charles Stewart was heavily involved in the development.

The southernmost stretch of St Ann's Villas continued the original style of Robert Cantwell but on reaching Queensdale Road the architectural style changes. Built as semi-detached villas in the Tudor Gothic style, it provides a distinct contrast to the rest of the estate, which uses white stucco terracing. A number of the buildings are now Grade II listed. The music hall performer Albert Chevalier was born in the street in 1861 and is now commemorated by a blue plaque.

The name may refer to a planned but never built St Ann's Church for the new development. Instead the church serving the new district St James' Church was located in the nearby St James' Gardens. The street continues north as St Ann's Road for some distance, then becomes Bramley Road shortly before reaching Latimer Road tube station. Also first laid out in the Victorian era, very few of the original buildings now survive.

== Bibliography ==
- Bebbington, Gillian. London Street Names. Batsford, 1972.
- Cherry, Bridget & Pevsner, Nikolaus. London 3: North West. Yale University Press, 2002.
- Hibbert, Christopher Weinreb, Ben, Keay, John & Keay, Julia. The London Encyclopaedia. Pan Macmillan, 2011.
