= Campden Hill =

Hill in Kensington, London, England

Coordinates: 51°30′16″N 0°11′55″W

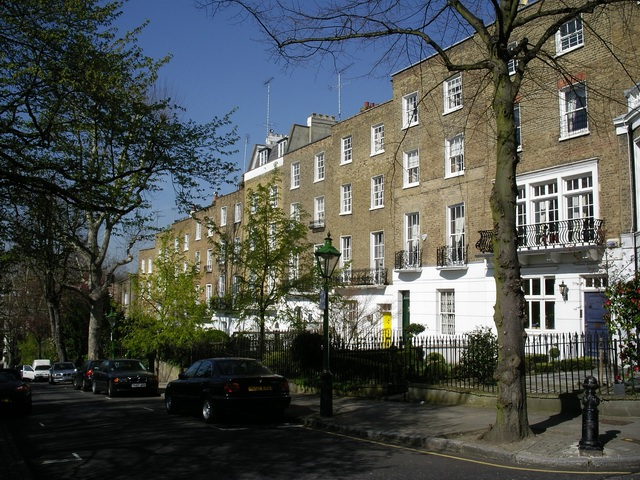
Campden Hill Square, Regency houses on north side of Campden Hill

Campden Hill is a hill in Kensington, West London, bounded by Holland Park Avenue on the north, Kensington High Street on the south, Kensington Palace Gardens on the east and Abbotsbury Road on the west. The name derives from the former Campden House, built by Baptist Hicks, 1st Viscount Campden whose country seat was Campden House in the Gloucestershire town of Chipping Campden.

The hill contains Holland Park, the former deer-park of Holland House; after being bombed in the London Blitz in 1940, the surviving parts of the mansion house can be seen in the south-west corner of the park. To the east of Holland House, the south-west side of the hill is characterized by large Victorian houses which are part of the Phillimore estate. Aubrey House is situated on top of Campden Hill. Campden Hill Square on the north-west side is formed of large Regency houses.

The small street called Campden Hill runs from Campden Hill Road westward into Holland Park. It was built on part of the grounds of the former Bute House.

Bute House was built c.1812, and was named after the second Marquess of Bute who lived there from 1830 until 1842. The next occupant was Rt. Hon. William Sebright Lascelles, the third son of the second Earl of Harewood; his widow Lady Caroline Lascelles lived there until 1856. The sixth Duke of Rutland lived there from 1865 until his death in 1888. The last owner was Blundell Charles Weld, a Lancashire landowner, who renamed the house Blundell House. After he left the house in 1912 or 1913 it was demolished.

1 Campden Hill was built in 1915 by Colonel Edmond Hills, President of the Royal Astronomical Society and his wife Juliet, to the designs of Edward P. Warren. A street named Observatory Gardens is situated nearby. From the 1950s to 2001, it was the residence of the Ambassador of Uruguay and has since been marketed by the Phillimore Estate as a private home.

Campden Hill Gate, a mansion block of flats, was used for the filming of the ITV dramatization of the Agatha Christie short story, "The Adventure of the Cheap Flat" (1990) in their Agatha Christie's Poirot series. Earlier Campden Hill had been the setting for a popular mystery story by Victor Bridges: The Red Lodge: A Mystery of Campden Hill (1924).

50 Campden Hill Square, was the home, from 1907 to 1939, of Evelyn Underhill the Christian philosopher, teacher and pacifist. It is marked with a blue plaque.

The Windsor Castle public house is a Grade II listed building at 114 Campden Hill Road, dating from 1826.

The top of the hill was the site of water-tower reservoirs established in the 19th century by the Grand Junction Waterworks Company and the West Middlesex Waterworks Company.

Writer, poet and philosopher G. K. Chesterton wrote in his autobiography that he was born on Campden Hill, Kensington and mentioned the water-tower, as well. Educator and suffragist Margaret Emily Hodge was also born in Campden Hill.

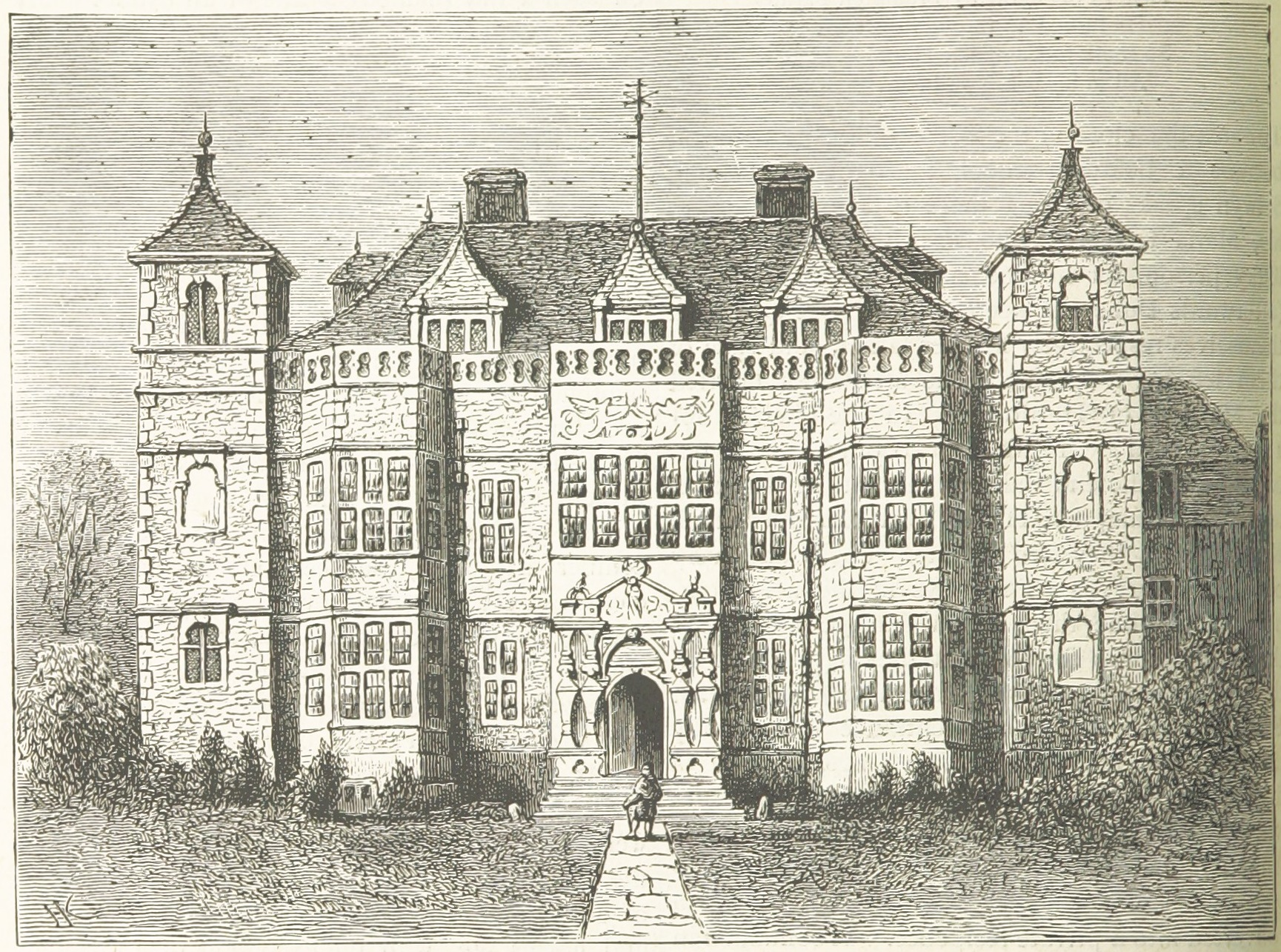
Campden House in 1720
