= Portland Road =

Portland Road may refer to:

== Australia ==
- Portland Road, Queensland, a town in the Shire of Cook

== United Kingdom ==
- Edgbaston Foundation Ground, a cricket ground located on Portland Road, Birmingham, and sometimes referred to as such
- Portland Road, Notting Hill, a road in the London Borough of Kensington and Chelsea
- A section of the A215 road in Norwood, south London
- Portland Roads, England
