= Clodagh Hope Knox Sparrow =

British commercial artist (1905–1957)

Clodagh Hope Knox Sparrow (24 July 1905 – 28 July 1957), also known as Hope Knox, was a British artist best known for her railway travel and holiday posters. She was frequently commissioned by railway companies from the 1930s and into the 1940s.

== Early life ==
Knox Sparrow, also known as Hope Knox, was born in British Burma on 24 July 1905. Her parents were Ida Eliza Barbour (née Johnston) and Joseph James Knox Sparrow, a British engineer. By 1911, her family had moved to the United Kingdom and lived in West Division, Carrickfergus, County Antrim in Northern Ireland.

During World War II, Knox Sparror worked for the Norwegian High Command, producing maps used for air raids on occupied Norway. After the war, she studied at the Byam Shaw School of Art in London and the Slade School of Fine Art at the University College London.

== Career ==
Knox Sparrow had exhibitions in London at at the Royal Academy of Art in 1938 and 1948, at the Cooling Galleries on New Bond Street in 1949, and at Leighton House in 1954. However, she was best known for her railway travel and holiday posters. During the 1930s and the 1940s, Know Sparrow was frequently commissioned to design posters British Railways, the Great Western Railway, London Midland and Scottish, London Transport, and Southern Railway. She was a member of the Arts Society of Paddington.

Examples of her work are in the collections of the Victoria and Albert Museum, the London Transport Museum, and the Science Museum, London.

== Personal life ==
Knox Sparrow lived at several locations in London, including 21 Royal Crescent in late 1930s, and Clanricarde Gardens W2 in the late 1940s and early 1950s. From 1953 until she died, she lived at 52 Norland Square, Holland Park, London. Knox Sparrow died on 28 July 1957 in a nursing home in Kensington, London.

== Selected works ==
- "The Lake District for Holidays: Ullswater" (1937), for the London, Midland and Scottish Railway
- "Live in Kent and be content" (1937), for the Southern Railway (UK)
- "Epsom, May 23rd-26th" (1939), for the London Passenger Transport Board
- "Ireland for Holidays: Killarney" (c. 1939), for the London Midland and Scottish Railway
- "Some Place of Interest, Served by London's Underground" (1947), for London Transport
- "Royal Tunbridge Wells" (1947), for British Railways
