= Portland Road, Notting Hill =

Street in Notting Hill, London

Coordinates: 51.50985°N 0.2102°W

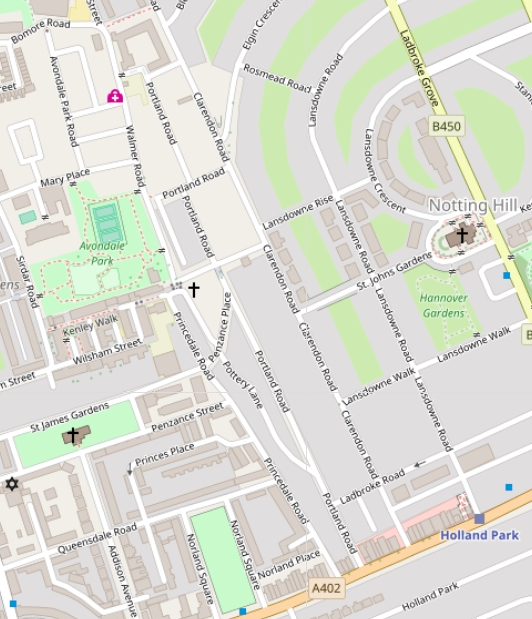
Map of Portland Road, shown vertically, running parallel with Clarendon Road.

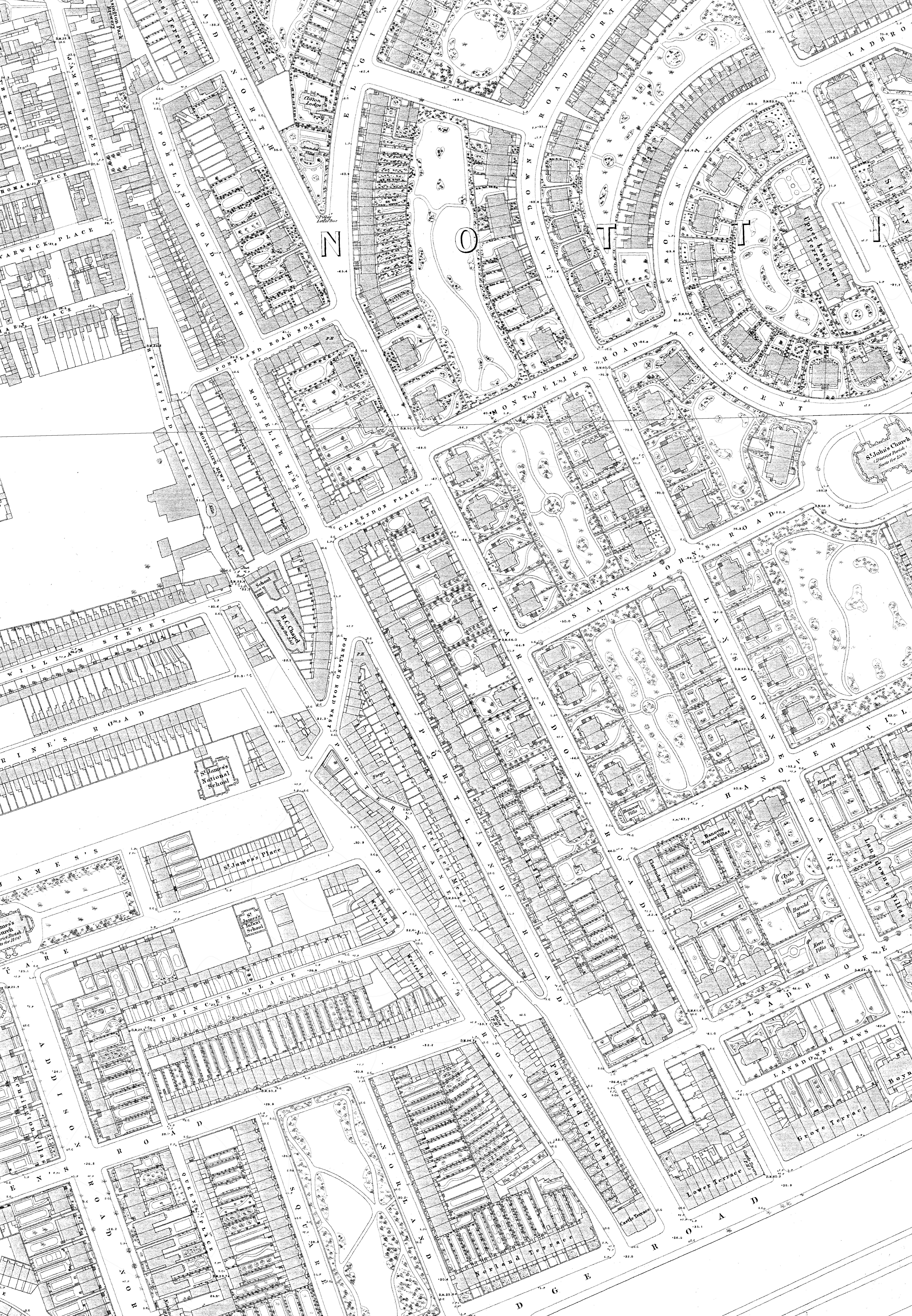
Portland Road (centre, vertical) on an 1860s Ordnance Survey map.

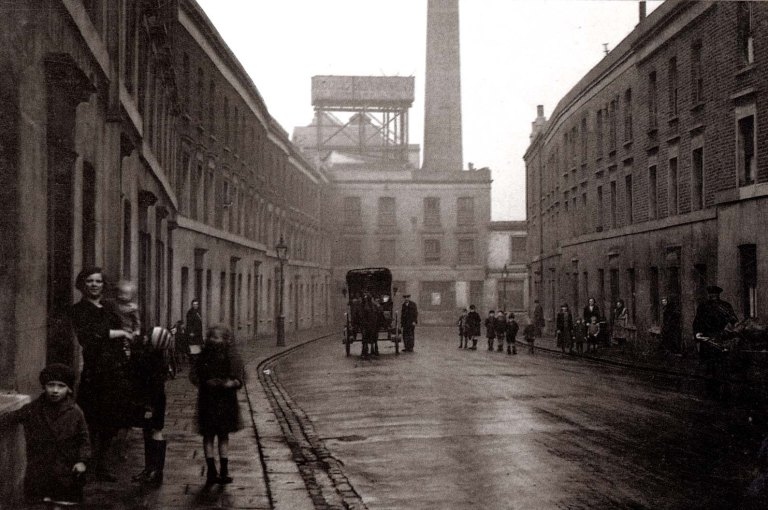
North end of Portland Road with Notting Hill Brewery at the end.

Portland Road is a road in Notting Hill, in the Royal Borough of Kensington and Chelsea that was built as a speculative development in the 1850s. The road has been noted for its division into three sections of different wealth: the section between Holland Park Avenue and Clarendon Cross/Hippodrome Place being one of the most expensive places to buy a house in London, a section of terraced houses further north being also very expensive but less so than the lower reaches of the road, and a section at the northern end that was once slums and is now working class social housing and is described as being north of an "invisible line" that divides it from the privately owned sections of the road.

== Location ==
The road runs from Clarendon Road in the north to Holland Park Avenue in the south and is crossed by Hippodrome Place and Clarendon Cross. It is joined on its western side by Penzance Place and Pottery Lane, and on its eastern side by Ladbroke Road. The part above Clarendon Cross was originally known as Montpellier Terrace and the part north of that as Portland Road North. The houses on the west side in the southern end of the road were originally known as Portland Gardens.

== History ==
Portland Road was built by speculative developers in the 1850s on a strip of land between the affluent Ladbroke Estate to the east and the Norland Estate to the west, home to the Potteries and Piggeries, one of the most notorious slums in London. At first all the houses were rented and in the southern part occupied by well-off tenants with households of more modest means further north.

Winterbourne House was built between the wars in the northern part of the road behind Heathfield Street as part of the clearance of what was by then slum housing. It was partly occupied by people who worked in the adjacent Notting Hill Brewery. In the late 1930s, the far larger Nottingwood House was built at the far northern end of the road on the site of the brewery and slum housing.

In the twentieth century the road began to decline with most of the houses being in multiple occupation. Notting Hill slum landlord Peter Rachman owned property in the road.

From the 1960s the road began to be colonised by the middle classes again. In the later twentieth century, the road was blocked to vehicle traffic immediately below the junction with Hippodrome Place and Clarendon Cross, an action which has been seen as crystallising the class differences between the northern and the southern parts of the road. By the early twenty-first century, the southern end of the road had become a "ghetto" for bankers and it has been used as a case study of the gentrification of London streets.
