= Norland Square =

Garden square in London

Coordinates: 51.5069°N 0.2104°W

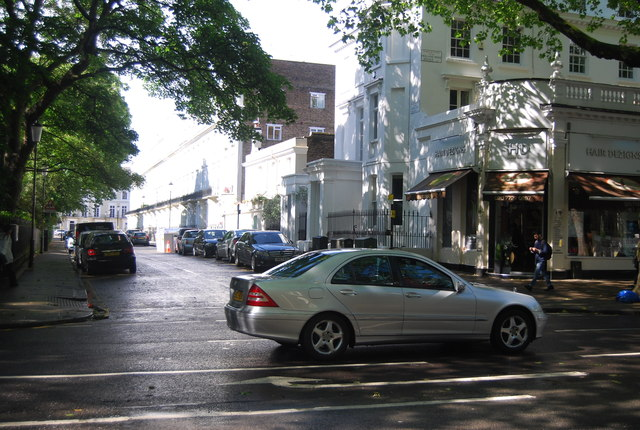
Norland Square seen from its southern end.

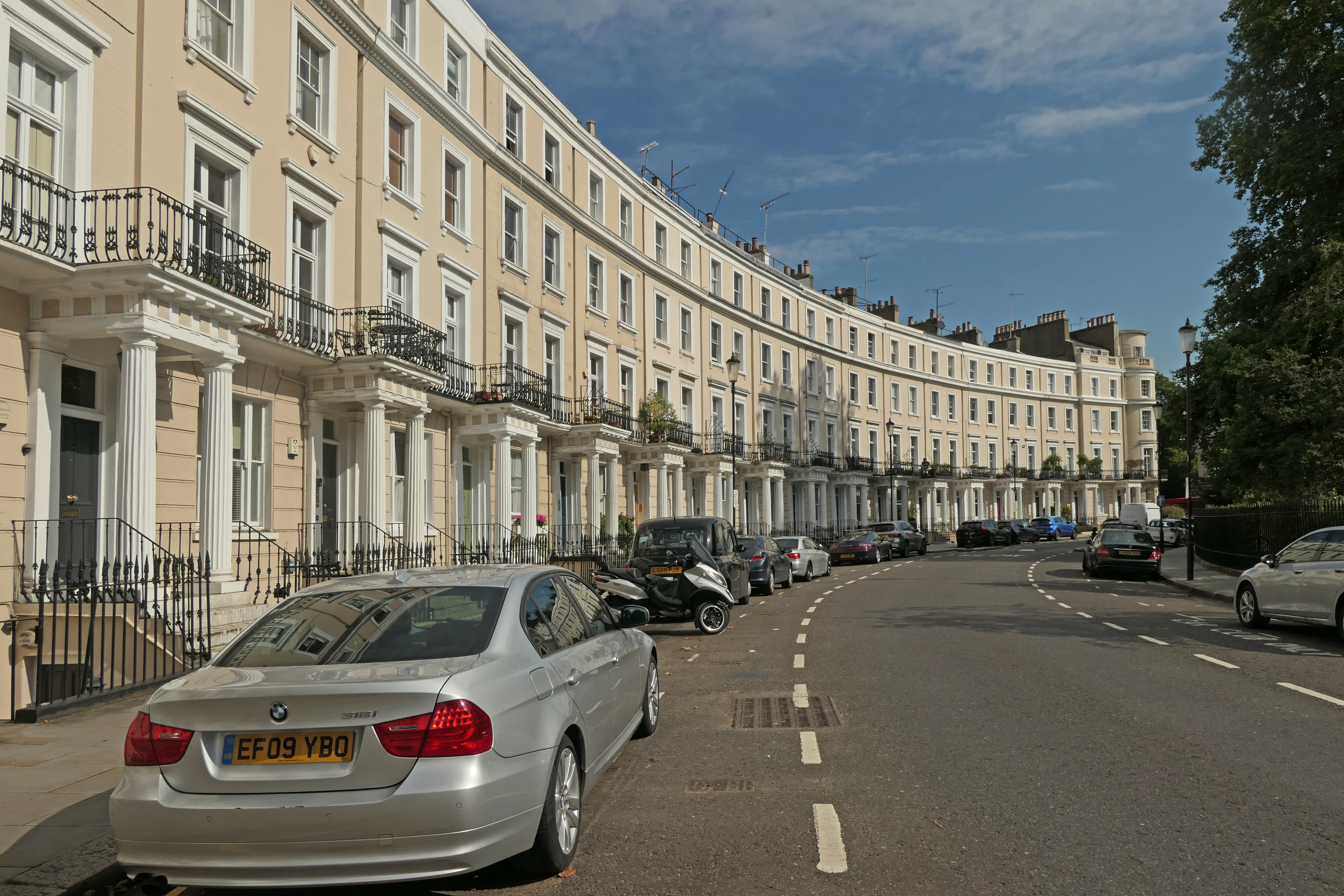
Royal Crescent, a little to the west, was developed at the same time as the square.

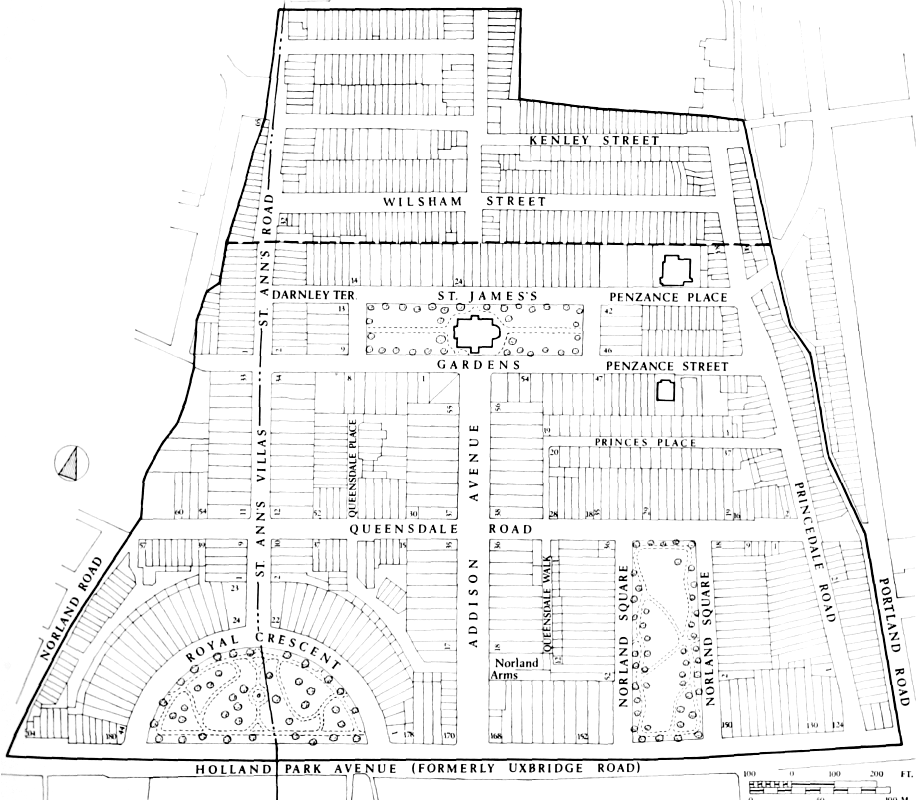
Map of the Norland Estate.

Norland Square is a garden square in the Notting Hill area of London. Located in the Royal Borough of Kensington and Chelsea, runs northward from Holland Park Avenue to Queensdale Road. The mews street Norland Place runs eastwards of the Square.

The name of the square, as well as the nearby Norland Place and Norland Road, come from the Norland Estate which is the historic name for the farmlands in the northern part (a shortened form of north land) of Kensington Parish. It was designed by architect and property developer Robert Cantwell, who laid out the area in 1837, and was constructed during the early Victorian era. Cantwell also oversaw the almost contemporaneous Royal Crescent, which was likewise developed from the old Norland Estate. Since the 1820s, Cantwell had been involved in development plans for the larger Ladbroke Estate to the north.

In 1876, Emily Ward founded the Norland Place School in an earlier Norland Place, now part of Holland Park Avenue. A number of buildings in the square are now Grade II listed. Poster artist Clodagh Hope Knox Sparrow lived at 52 Norland Square from 1953 until her death in 1957.

== See also ==
- St Ann's Villas, nearby street on the Norland Estate

== Bibliography ==
- Bebbington, Gillian. London Street Names. Batsford, 1972.
- Cherry, Bridget & Pevsner, Nikolaus. London 3: North West. Yale University Press, 2002.
- Hibbert, Christopher Weinreb, Ben, Keay, John & Keay, Julia. The London Encyclopaedia. Pan Macmillan, 2011.
