= Windsor Castle, Kensington =

Grade II listed public house in Kensington, London

Windsor Castle
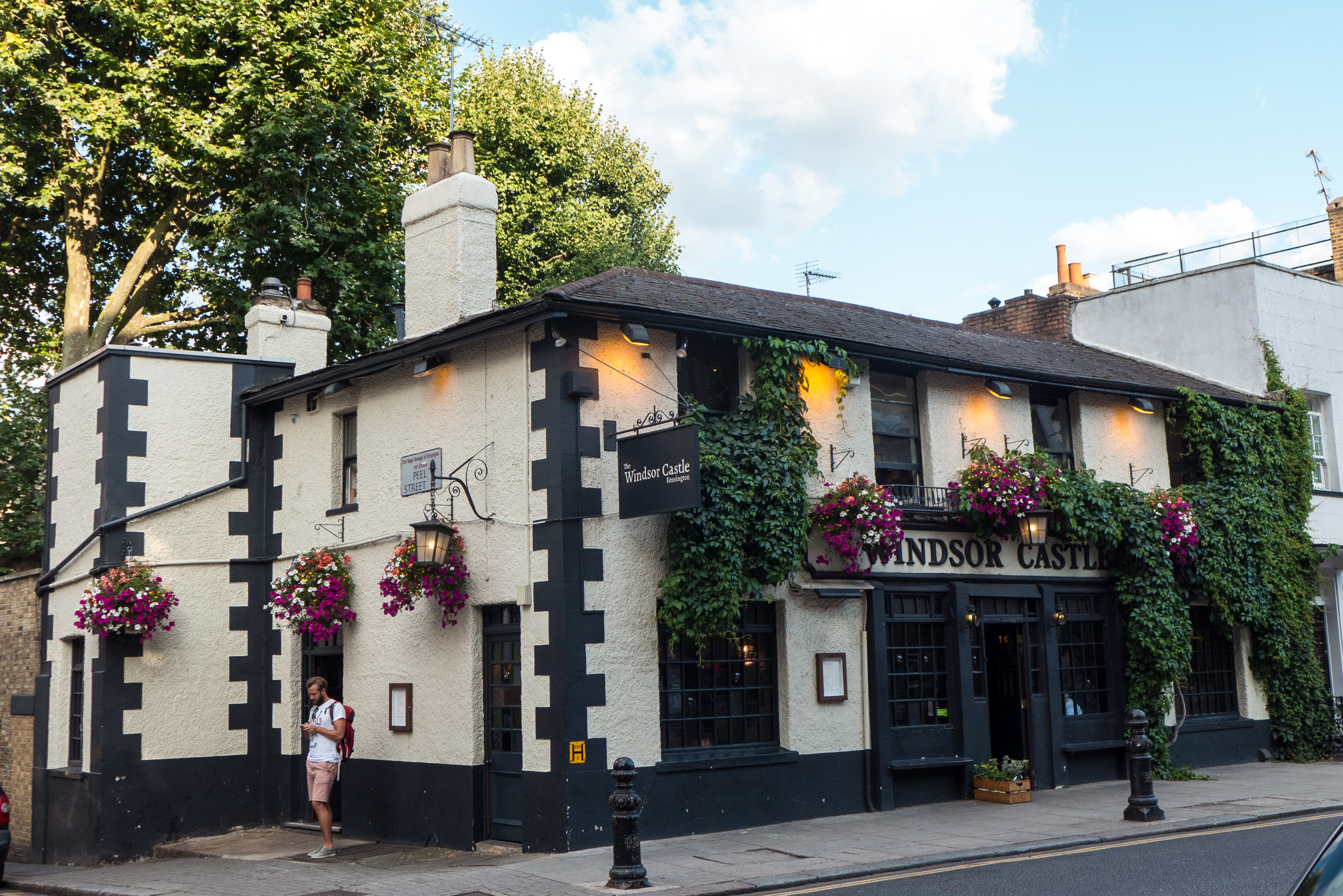
- The Windsor Castle

- Location within Royal Borough of Kensington and Chelsea Location within Greater London

General information
- Location: 114 Campden Hill Road, London, England
- Coordinates: 51°30′22.7″N 0°11′55″W
- Current tenants: Mitchells & Butlers
- Named for: Windsor Castle, Windsor
- Completed: 1826
- Renovated: 1933
- Landlord: Douglas and Henry Thompson of Chiswick (at inception)

Design and construction
- Designations

Listed Building – Grade II
- Official name: Windsor Castle
- Designated: 4 March 2010
- Reference no.: 1393696

The Windsor Castle is a Grade II listed public house at 114 Campden Hill Road near Holland Park, London.

Located on the corner of Campden Hill Road and Peel Street, the pub was built in about 1826 for the Chiswick brewers Douglas and Henry Thompson, on land rented on a 99-year lease from landowner John Ward. The architect is unknown. Remodelled in 1933, the pub is on the Campaign for Real Ale's National Inventory of Historic Pub Interiors.
