= Kensington Central Library =

Public library in London, England

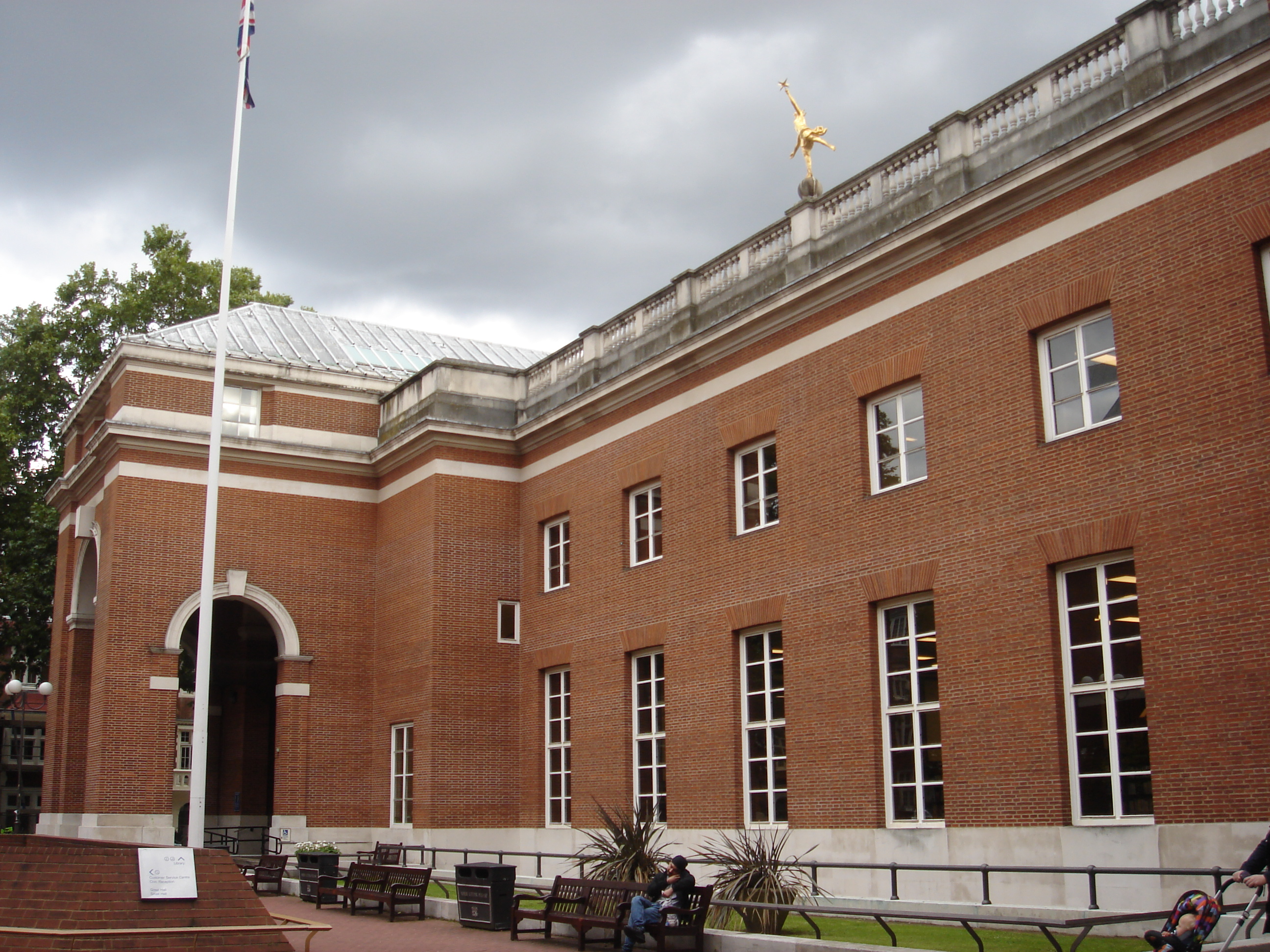

General information
- Location: Hornton Street and Phillimore Walk, Kensington, London, United Kingdom
- Coordinates: 51.5015°N 0.1945°W
- Opened: 13 July 1960
- Owner: Royal Borough of Kensington and Chelsea

Design and construction
- Architect: Vincent Harris

Website
- www.rbkc.gov.uk/libraries-0/libraries-and-room-hire/kensington-central-library

Kensington Central Library is a Grade II* listed building on Hornton Street and Phillimore Walk, Kensington, London. It is adjacent to Kensington Town Hall. It was built in 1958–60 by the architect E. Vincent Harris on the site of The Abbey, a Gothic house which had been constructed for a Mr Abbot in 1880 and destroyed by bombing in 1944. It was opened by the Queen Elizabeth The Queen Mother on 13 July 1960. The building was designed in a traditional, English, renaissance-style. There were demonstrations against the project by those who advocated for the building to be in a modern style.

The public library is within the Royal Borough of Kensington and Chelsea and is managed as part of a tri-borough integrated library and archive service, alongside those of Westminster and Hammersmith and Fulham.

On the south side of the library, facing Phillimore Walk, are two statues of a lion and a unicorn, both holding the Royal Arms of the United Kingdom. They were sculpted by William McMillan in order to reflect the "Royal" status of the Borough of Kensington and Chelsea.
