= Royal Crescent, London =

Street in Holland Park, London

Coordinates: 51.5057°N 0.2142°W

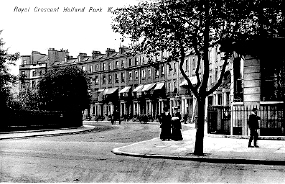
A postcard showing Royal Crescent, circa 1900

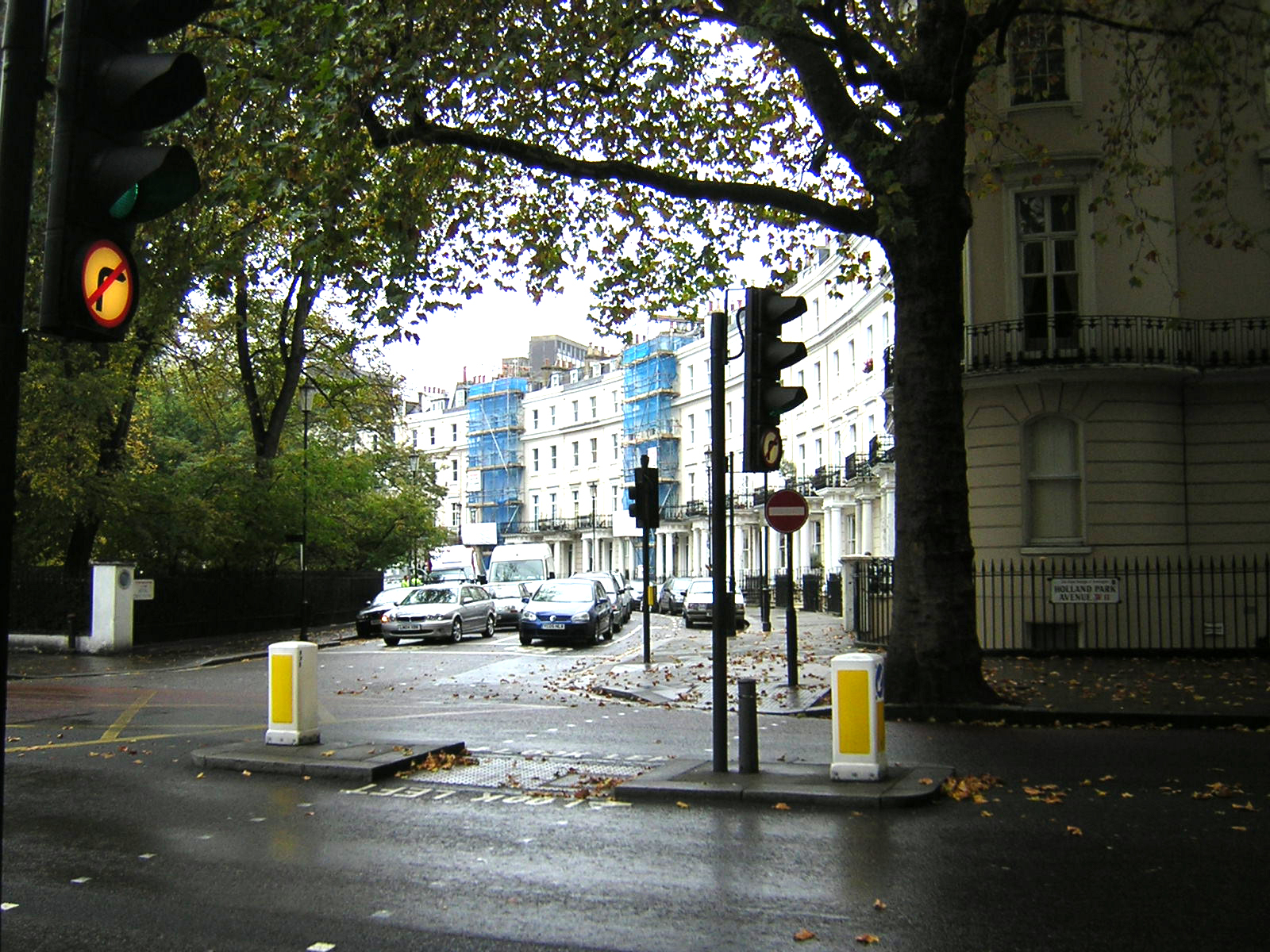
The same view of Royal Crescent in October 2009

The Royal Crescent is a Grade II* listed street in Holland Park, west London, England, consisting of two curved facing terraces in a crescent shape. The crescent is located on the north side of Holland Park Avenue, west of Addison Avenue, and to the east of the Holland Park Roundabout. St Ann's Villas leads north off the Crescent.

Between the facing terraces is a landscaped communal garden with expansive lawns and numerous trees. The houses themselves are stucco fronted and are built on four floors, with porticoed entrances, above which are small first-floor balconies with iron railings. Each of the end houses have circular corners.

== History ==
Designed in 1839, The Royal Crescent is one of the most architecturally interesting Nineteenth Century developments in Holland Park. Evidently inspired by its older namesake in Bath, it differs from the Bath crescent in that it is not strictly a true crescent but rather two quadrant terraces each terminated by a circular bow in the Regency style, rising as a tower, a feature which would not have been found in the earlier classically inspired architecture of the 18th century which the design of the crescent seeks to emulate. The plan of the Royal Crescent was the design of the planner Robert Cantwell, and it was the need for the newly fashionable underground sewers which caused the crescent to be designed in two halves rather than any consideration for architectural aesthetics. On early maps it is marked as Norland Crescent.

The stucco fronted crescent is painted white, in the style of the many Nash terraces which can be seen elsewhere in London's smarter residential areas. Today many of these four storey houses have been converted to apartments, although a few remain as private houses. The Royal Crescent is listed Grade II*.

=== Royal Crescent Mews ===
Behind the terraces is the Royal Crescent Mews. The Mews is a part-cobbled cul-de-sac off Queensdale Road in the Royal Borough of Kensington and Chelsea. It contains 34 properties used for residential purposes. It is part of Kensington's Norland Conservation Area; first designated in 1969, it contains Royal Crescent, Norland Square and St. James's gardens. Building of the area began in the 1840s and was completed just fifteen years later. It contains linked terraces and is largely urban in style.

== Notable residents ==
- Ferruccio Bonavia (1877–1950), violinist, composer and music critic, lived at number 41 Royal Crescent from 1919 until 1928.
- Clodagh Hope Knox Sparrow, poster artist, lived at 21 Royal Crescent in the late 1930s.
- John Gawsworth (1912–1970), writer, poet and compiler of anthologies, grew up in Colville Gardens and at number 40 Royal Crescent. He was crowned the king of Redonda in 1947 and became known as King Juan I. His real name was Terence Ian Fytton Armstrong.
- Ian Davies (1965-present), British photographer, resides and works at 176 Holland Park Avenue at The Fouzia Madani Agency.
- Paul Daniels (1938-2016), magician and TV show host whose red Ferrari with number plate MAG1C could be seen parked along the Royal Crescent throughout the 1980s and who was known to reside there, in relative proximity to the BBC studios
