= Clarendon Road =

Street in the Royal Borough of Kensington and Chelsea

Coordinates: 51.51124°N 0.21010°W

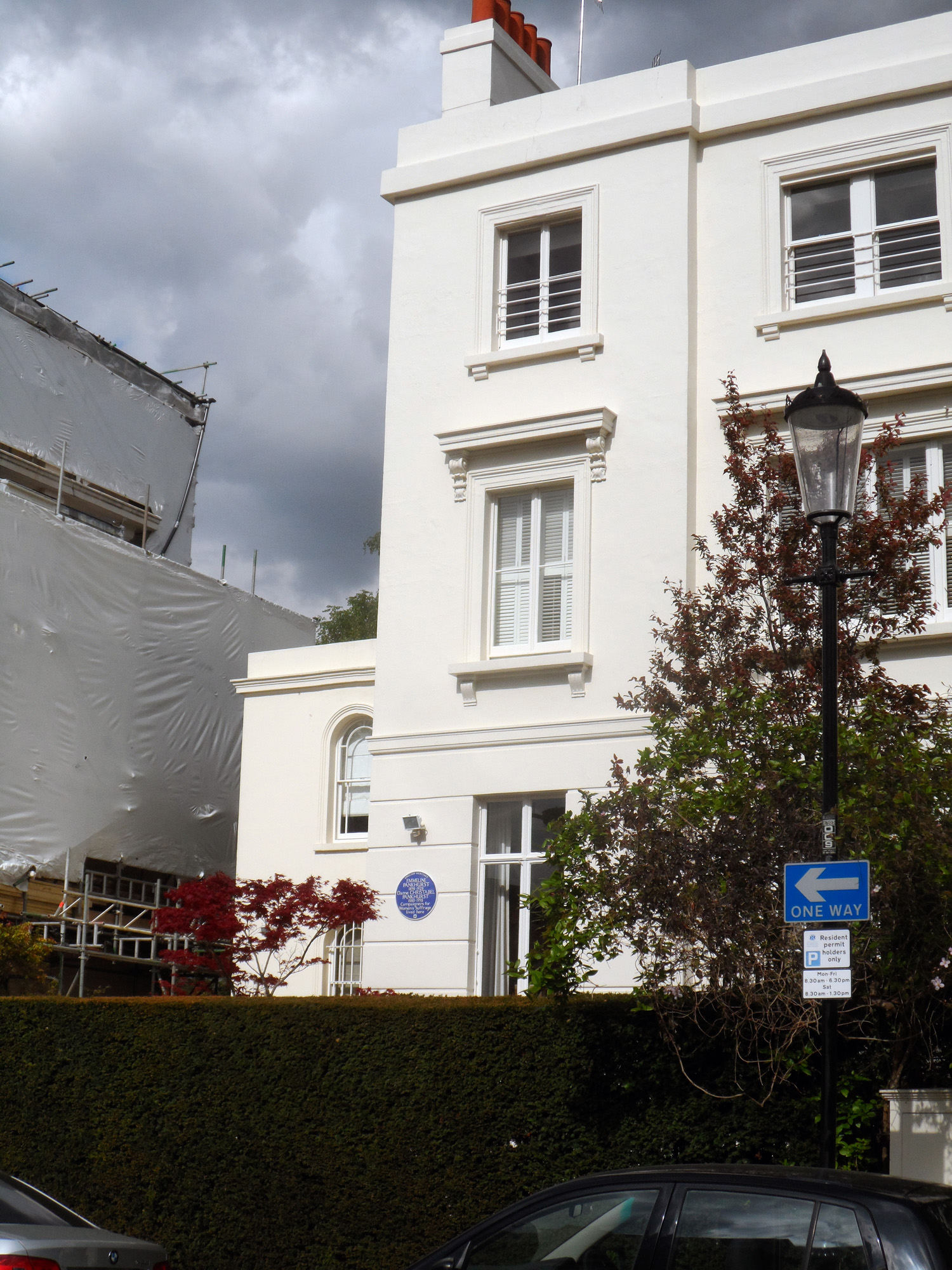
50 Clarendon Road, home to Emmeline Pankhurst and her daughter, fellow suffragist Christabel Pankhurst

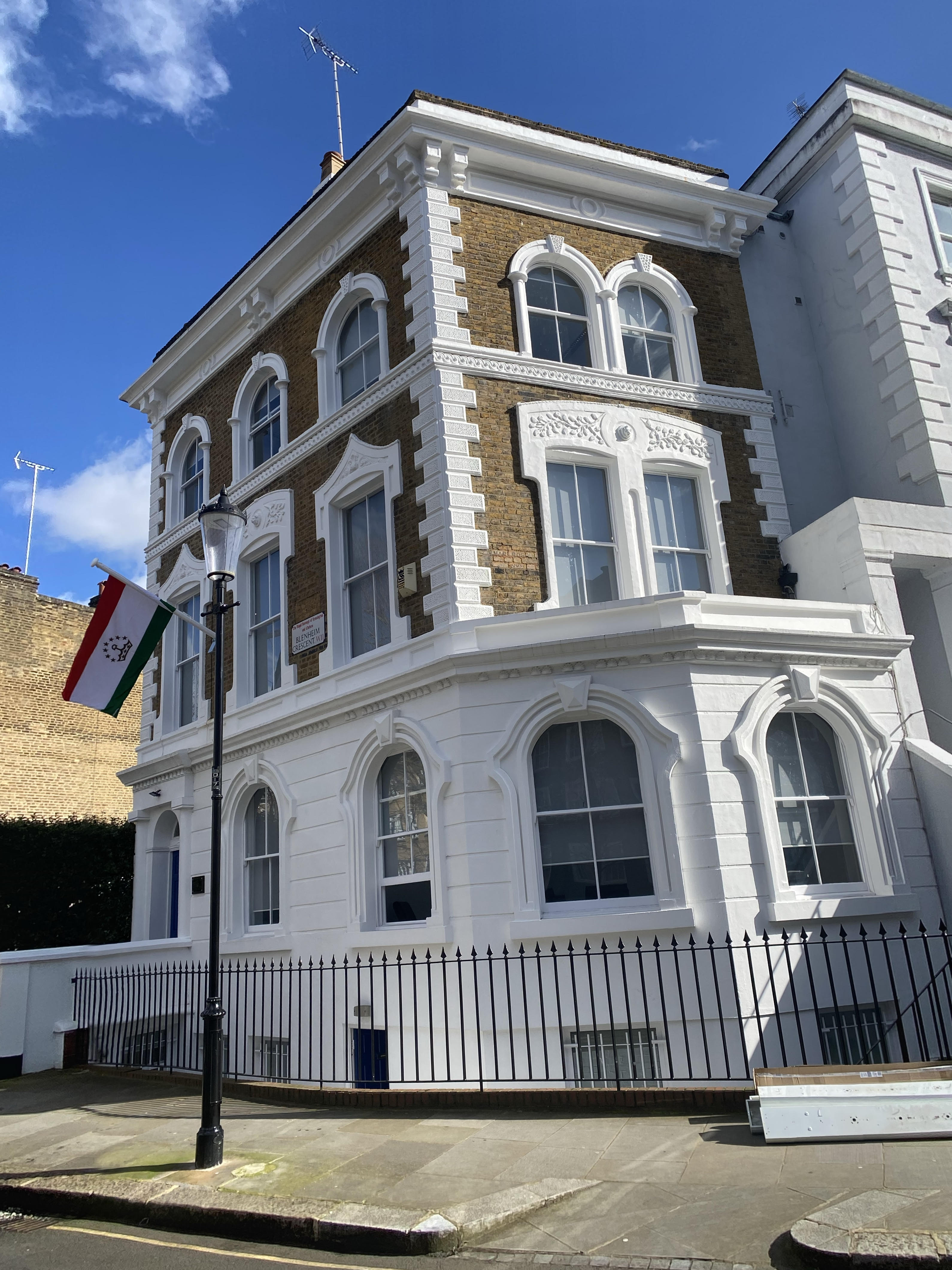
Embassy of Tajikistan, London is at no. 110

Clarendon Road is a street in the Royal Borough of Kensington and Chelsea, in the Notting Hill district of West London. It runs roughly south to north from Holland Park Avenue.

It is named after George Villiers, 4th Earl of Clarendon, who was Lord Privy Seal when the road was built.

The suffragists Emmeline Pankhurst and her daughter Christabel Pankhurst lived at no. 50, where in 2006 an English Heritage blue plaque was erected. A later resident, Mark Arnold-Forster, journalist and author, lived there until his death in 1981.

The author Arthur Machen (1863–1947) lived at no. 23, and in the 1880s wrote of his life here in his memoirs Far Off Things (1922) and Things Near and Far (1923).

The Embassy of Tajikistan in London is at no. 110.

In December 2022, Clarendon Road was reckoned to be the fifth most expensive street in England.
