= Campden Hill Road =

Street in Kensington, London, England

Coordinates: 51°30′13.78″N 0°11′49.79″W

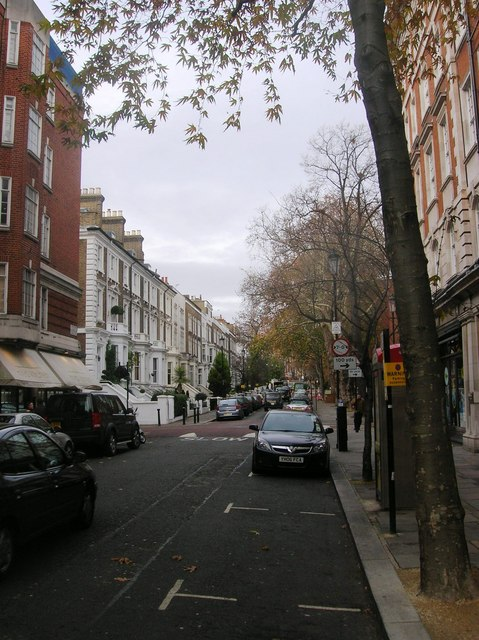
Campden Hill Road

Campden Hill Road is a street in Kensington, London W8. It runs north to south from Notting Hill Gate to Kensington High Street.

== History ==
Campden Hill Road was originally called Plough Lane. By 1879, William Abbott, a stockbroker, "held the lease of the site between Phillimore Walk, Campden Hill Road, and Hornton Street".

Notable residents include the novelist Ford Madox Ford (1873–1939) who lived at no 80, former Genesis frontman Peter Gabriel, the poet Cecil Day-Lewis, with his children, including the actor Sir Daniel Day-Lewis and wife Jill Balcon, and the publisher Andrew White Tuer (1838–1900). Anglo-American landscape painter George Henry Boughton (1834–1905) lived and died at No. 118, West House, in a house built for him.

Kensington Town Hall and the Kensington Central Library are located at the south of the street.
