= Paultons Square =

Garden square in Chelsea, London

Coordinates: 51.4845°N 0.1738°W

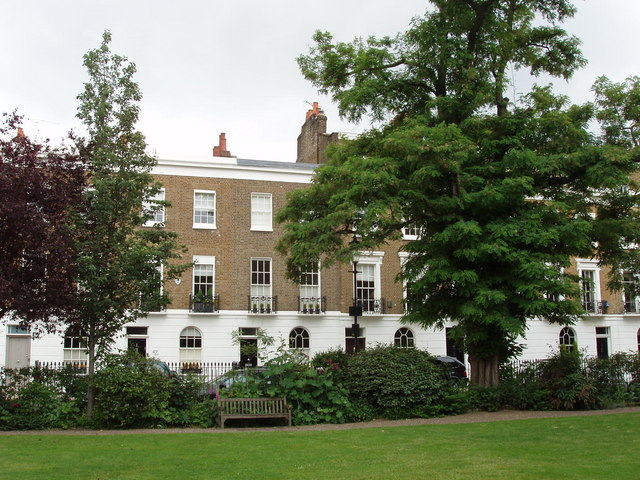
Terraced houses in Paultons Square

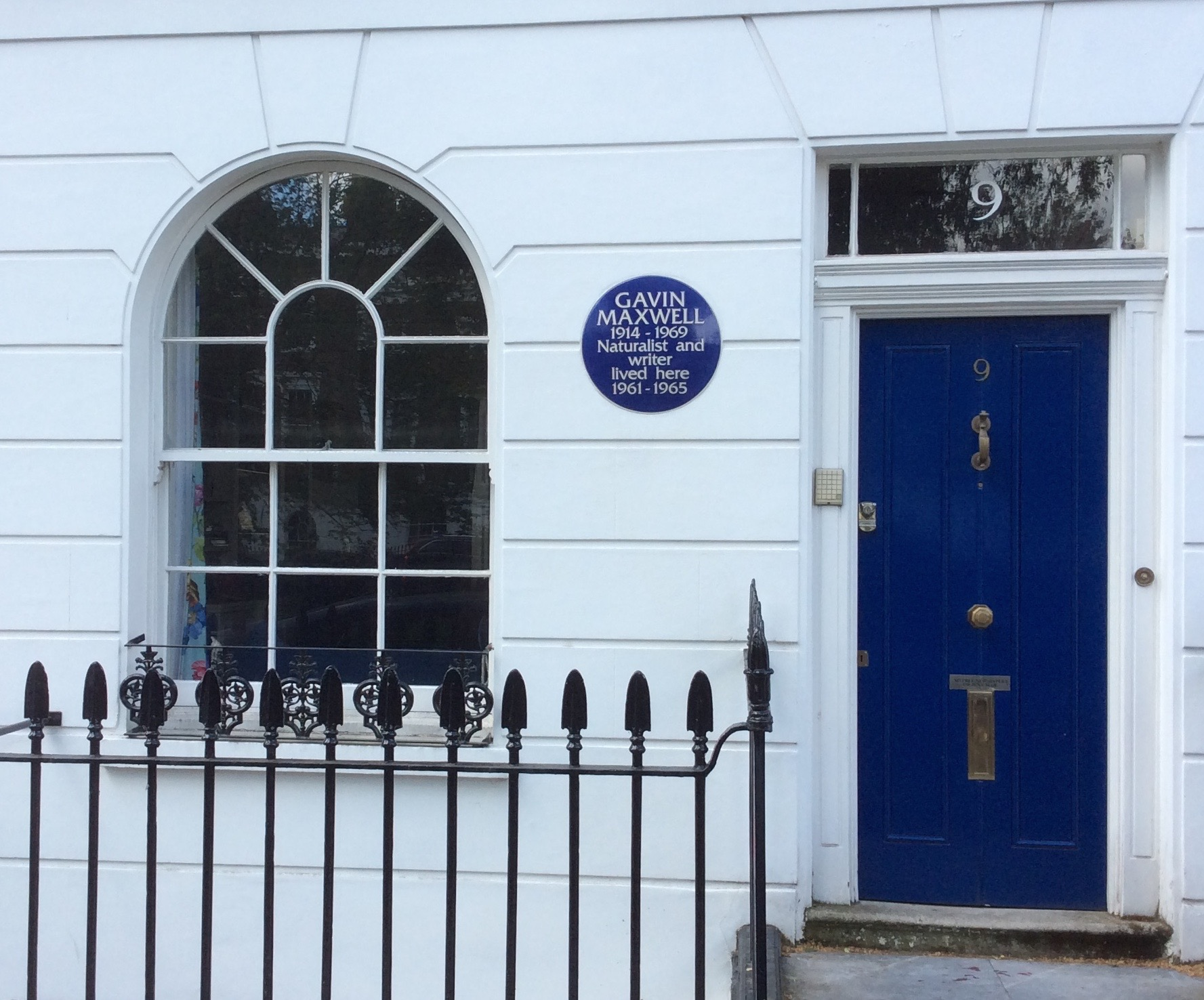
A blue plaque commemorating writer and naturalist Gavin Maxwell

Paultons Square is a Georgian terraced garden square in Chelsea, London, SW3. It was built in 1836–40 on the site of a former market garden, land previously owned by Sir Thomas More and Sir John Danvers. The square features a central lawn enclosed by metal railings; the houses surrounding it are listed Grade II on the National Heritage List for England.

The author Gavin Maxwell is a notable former resident of the square – he lived at No. 9 from 1961 to 1965 – and it is often visited by admirers of his work. The novelist and short-story writer Jean Rhys lived in Flat 22 in Paulton House in the square from 1936 to 1938, and the writer Samuel Beckett lived at No. 48 from 1933 to 1934. The physicist Patrick Blackett also lived at No. 48. Other residents include the painters Augustus John, at No. 45, and Paul Nash, at No. 19, the poet Kathleen Raine, at No. 47, and lexicographer Henry Watson Fowler, at No. 14. Beckett, Blackett, Rhys, Fowler and Maxwell all have blue plaques.

The garden is 0.3535 hectares (0.874 acres) in size and was redesigned in 2000. It is accessible only to local residents.
