= St James' Church, Norlands =

Coordinates: 51.5082°N 0.2131°W

St James's Church, Norlands
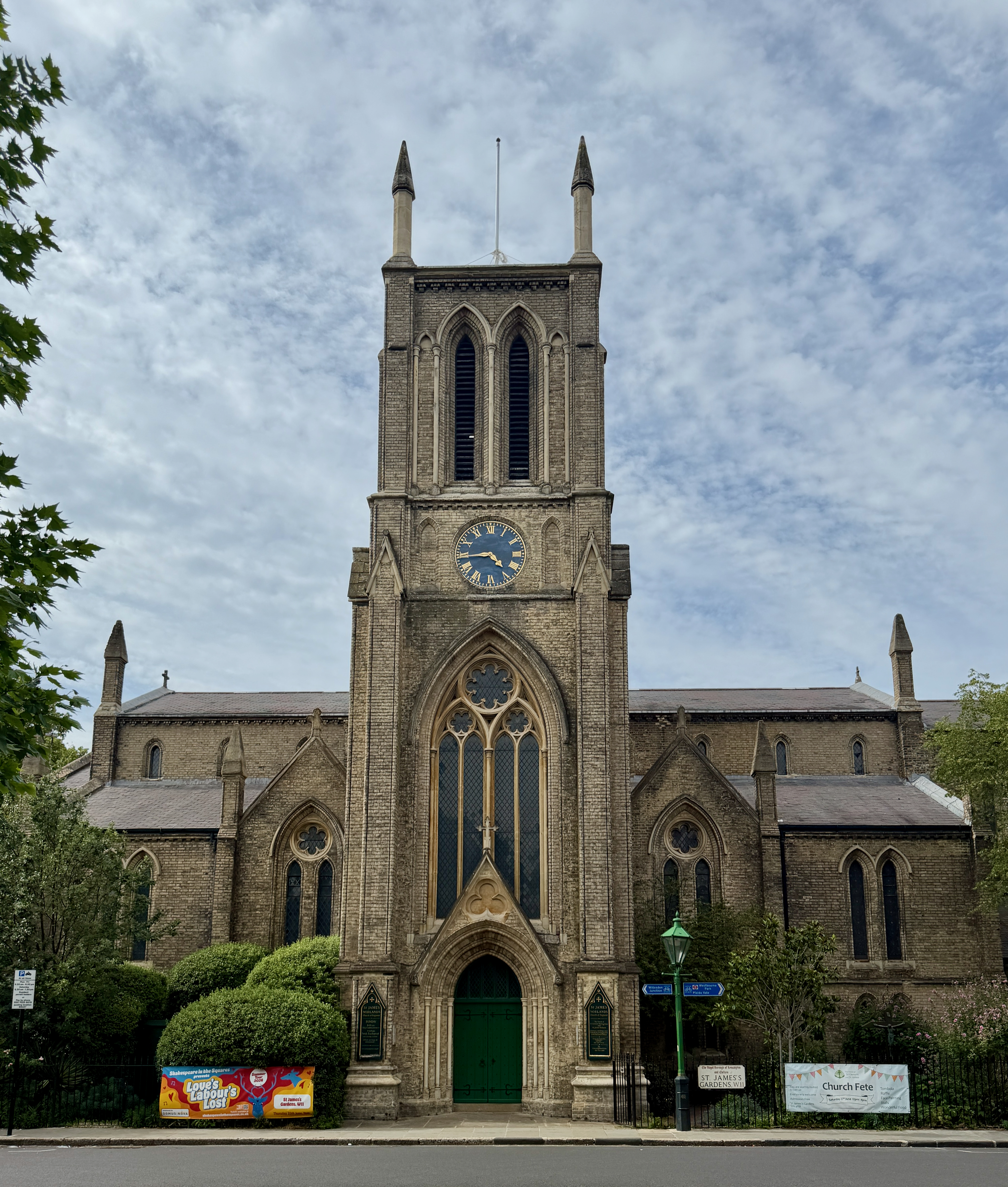
- St James's Church, Norlands
- Location: St James's Gardens; London; W11 4RB
- Country: England
- Denomination: Church of England
- Churchmanship: Liberal Catholic

Architecture
- Architect(s): Lewis Vulliamy; Robert Jewell Withers
- Completed: 1845

Administration
- Diocese: London
- Deanery: Kensington
- Parish: St Clement and St James

Listed Building – Grade II
- Official name: Church of St James
- Designated: 7 November 1984
- Reference no.: 1226520

St James' Church, Norlands, is a historic Grade II listed church in London, United Kingdom. It is affiliated with the Church of England. It was designed by architects Lewis Vulliamy and Robert Jewell Withers, and its construction was completed in 1845. The church was consecrated on 17 July of the same year.

The church is built of white Suffolk bricks and is orientated east to west with the tower positioned south of the central bay. The entrance is through a porch, built into base of the tower, facing down Addison Avenue. The simple body of the church makes the three-stage tower, built in 1850, stand out. The first stage has gabled Buttresses with roll-moulded edges. The second stage has a clock-face set in on each side and is considerably shorter than any other stage. The final belfry stage has two deeply-recessed paired lancets flanked by single blind lancet panels. There is a drawing in Kensington Public Library which shows that the tower was designed to have been topped with a broach spire, however, this was never built, and the tower seems somewhat abrupt and unfinished without it, as the thin octagonal pinnacles on each corner stand out against the sky.

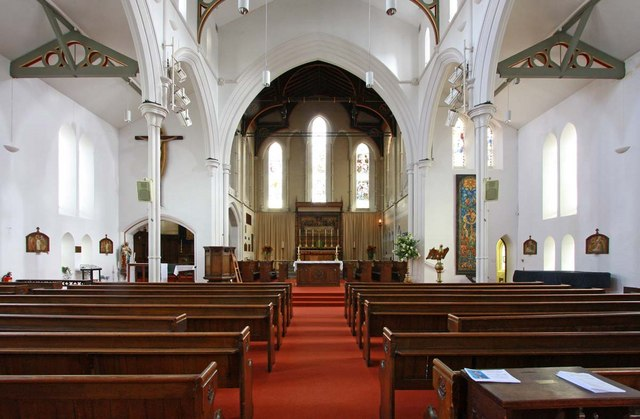
The Interior, a view down the nave.

Vulliamy's original design provided polygonal apsidal projections at the east and west ends, but these were never built. In 1876 the eastern end was extended by the architect, R. J. Withers. These extensions provide the present chancel, vestries and an organ chamber.

The church is set in a small garden square, which is laid out in an informal style and is mainly two lawn areas with planting at the edges. The views are dominated by the mature chestnut and lime trees which surround the garden. These gardens are private and used by adjacent properties, and only open to the public occasionally.

== Organ and organists ==
The church houses a historic pipe organ built in 1895 by James Jepson Binns of Bramley, Leeds. Originally installed in the organ chamber above the Lady Chapel, the instrument was moved to its current position in the west gallery of the church in 1921. Composer and singer Betty Roe was long-term organist at the church, and with her husband, the publisher John Bishop, contributed to the local music making there. Jane Parker-Smith was also organist for a time before she took up her 30-year appointment at Christuskirche in Knightsbridge.

== Present day ==
The parish of "St. Clement with St. Mark, Notting Dale and St. James, Norlands" is part of the Archdeaconry of Middlesex in the Diocese of London. The church stands in the Liberal Catholic tradition of the Church of England.
