= Norland Estate =

Coordinates: 51.508°N 0.213°W

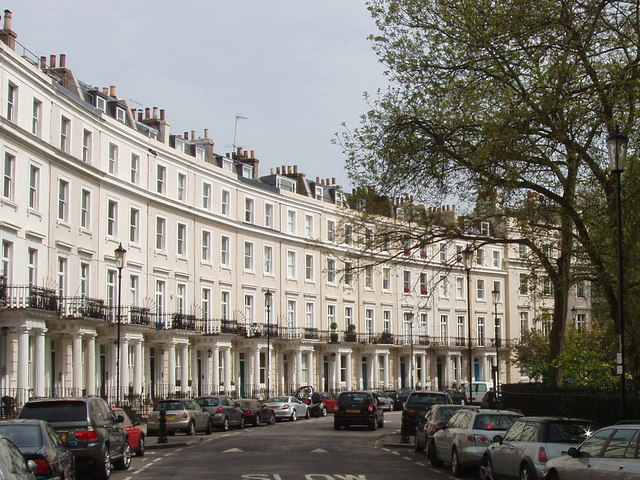
Royal Crescent on the Norland Estate

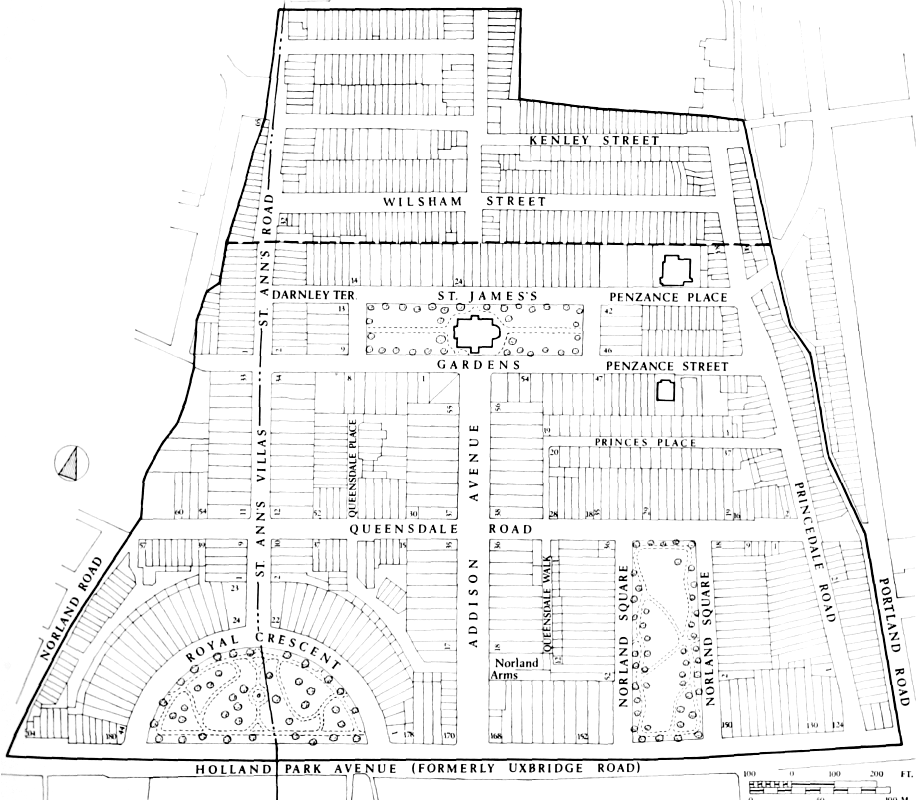
Norland Estate plan

The Norland Estate was an historic estate of fifty-two acres north of Holland Park Avenue (formerly the Uxbridge Road) and bounded in the east by the roads now known as Portland Road and Pottery Lane, and in the west by the borders of the parishes of Kensington and Hammersmith. The estate began to be built in 1839, and was largely complete by the early 1850s. The master-plan was designed by Robert Cantwell.
