= Robert Cantwell (architect) =

British architect

- Born: c. 1793
- Died: 1859
- Occupation: Architect

Robert Cantwell (c. 1793–1859) was a British architect. He laid out the Norland Estate in Holland Park (north of Holland Park Avenue), where he also designed Norland Square and Royal Crescent. On Holland Park Avenue, he designed terraced houses at Nos. 2–6, and No. 10.
