= Hornton Street =

Street in Kensington, London

Coordinates: 51°30′14.19″N 0°11′44.27″W

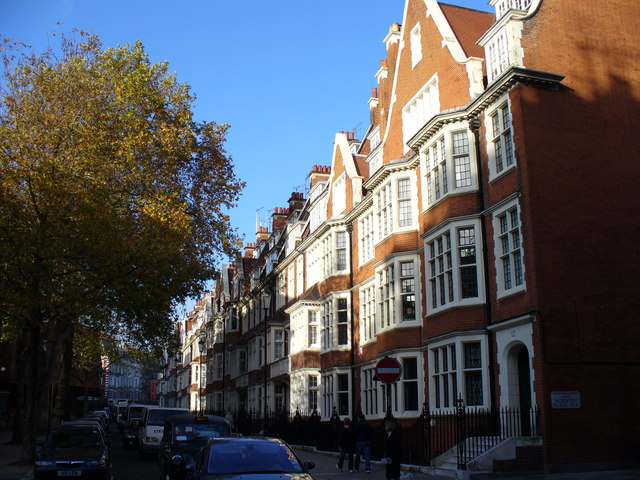
Hornton Street

Hornton Street is a street in Kensington, London. It runs north to south from Sheffield Terrace to Kensington High Street.

== History ==
Some of the road, at least, was originally called Campden House Road.

A chapel on the corner of Hornton Street and Hornton Place was built in 1794 for Congregationalists on land owned by William Phillimore. By 1858, it became a Baptist chapel. However, it was demolished in 1927.

The street was home to a Nonconformist school until it was torn down in 1868 for the construction of the Metropolitan Railway.

The musician Sir Charles Stanford (1852–1924) lived at No. 56 from 1894 to 1916, and this is commemorated with a blue plaque, erected in 1961.

Many of the houses are listed, including the entire terrace from 12 to 54, built from 1903, and designed by Frank Chesterton; running between Holland Street and Hornton Place, opposite Kensington Town Hall and Kensington Central Library.

In 2017 No. 60 Hornton Street, described by the Twentieth Century Society as "an important example of Modern Movement domestic architecture", was added to the Society's Risk List of architecture at risk of being lost; it was ultimately demolished in 2018.
