= Holland Park Avenue =

Road in the Royal Borough of Kensington & Chelsea

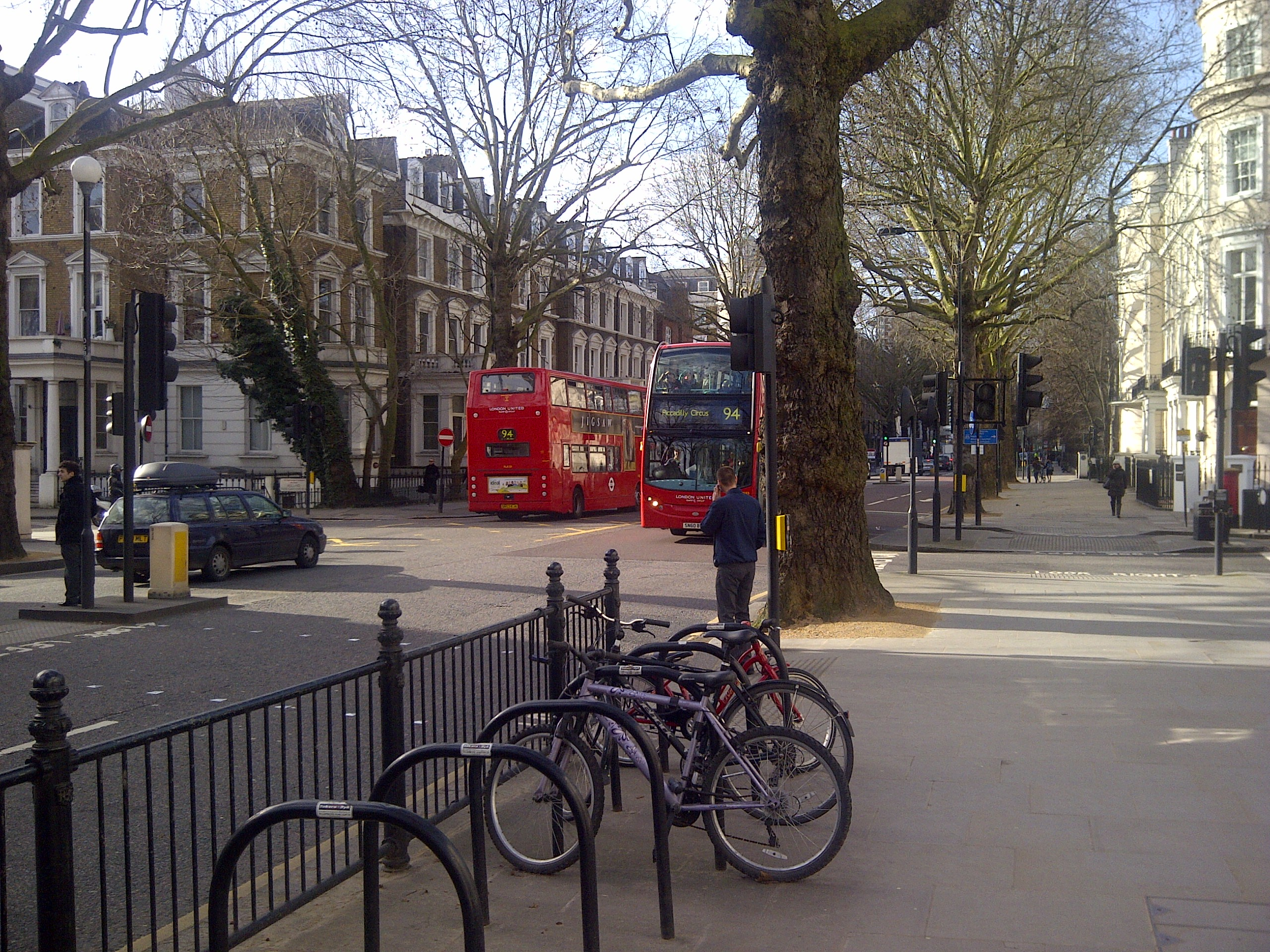
- Holland Park Avenue
- Interactive map of Holland Park Avenue
- Length: 0.7 mi (1.1 km)
- Postal code: W11
- Coordinates: 51.5056°N 0.2087°W
- east end: Notting Hill Gate
- west end: West Cross Route

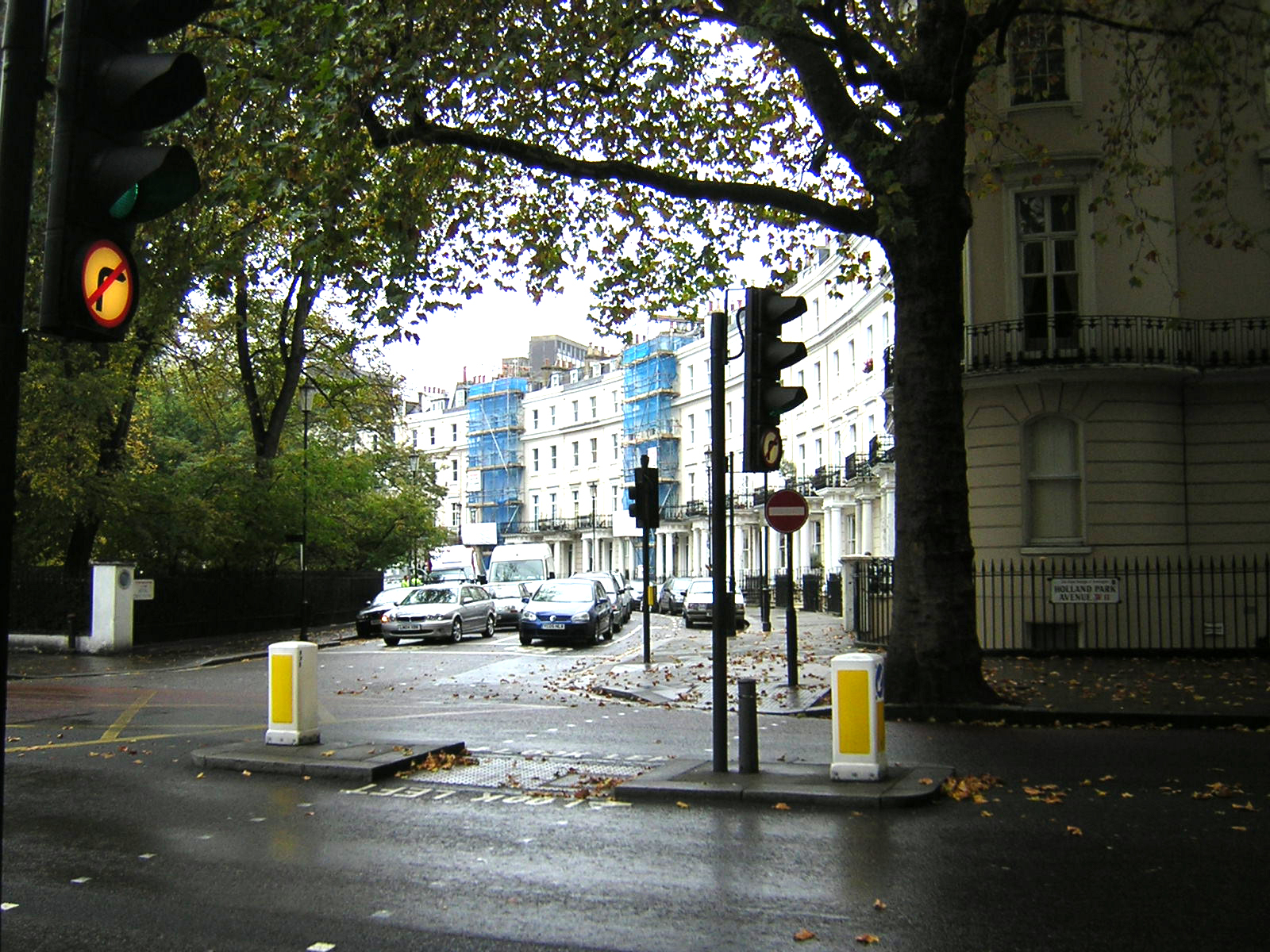
Royal Crescent, viewed from Holland Park Avenue

Holland Park Avenue is a street located in the Royal Borough of Kensington and Chelsea, in west central London. The street runs from Notting Hill Gate in the east to the Holland Park Roundabout in the west, forms a part of the old west road connecting London with Oxford and the west of England, and is designated part of the A402 road.

Holland Park Avenue's present design was laid out in the 19th century. Despite being a busy traffic artery, the street is elegantly lined with large well-established plane trees and boasts attractive terraces of large Victorian townhouses, as well as numerous high-end shops and restaurants.

Politically, Holland Park Avenue is located at the boundaries of four electoral wards: Norland, Holland, Pembridge, and Camden.

To the south of the street is Holland Park, one of London's largest parks.

== History ==
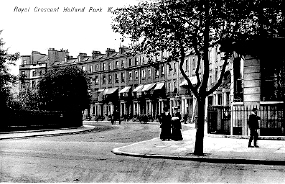
A postcard showing Royal Crescent, viewed from Holland Park Avenue, circa 1900

The street was largely rural until the 19th century. Most of the surrounding neighbourhood was formerly the grounds of the Jacobean mansion Holland House. In the later decades of the 19th century the owners of the house sold off land for residential development, and the district which evolved took its name from the house.

The area was for the most part upper middle class when originally developed and in recent decades has become wealthier. Holland Park Avenue now forms the main artery for one of the most expensive residential districts in London and anywhere in the world, with large houses regularly listed for sale at well over £10m. A number of countries maintain embassies in the neighbourhood, with the Embassy of Turkmenistan located on the road itself.

Part of the north side of Holland Park Avenue is formed by Royal Crescent, a group of two quadrant terraces each terminated by a circular bow in the Regency style.

== Transport links ==
Holland Park Avenue is the site of Holland Park tube station on the Central line, and at its western end, across Holland Park Roundabout, is Shepherd's Bush tube station, also on the Central line. The avenue is on the route of Transport for London bus routes 31, 94, 148 and 228 as well as night bus route N207 and the 24-hour Oxford Tube coach service.

== See also ==
- James McBey, commemorated by a plaque at 1 Holland Park Avenue
- Caroline Benn, commemorated by a plaque at 12 Holland Park Avenue
- Eugen Sandow, commemorated by a plaque at 161 Holland Park Avenue
- P.D. James, commemorated by a plaque at 58 Holland Park Avenue
