= Holland Park =

Area of central London, England

Coordinates: 51.5028°N 0.2038°W

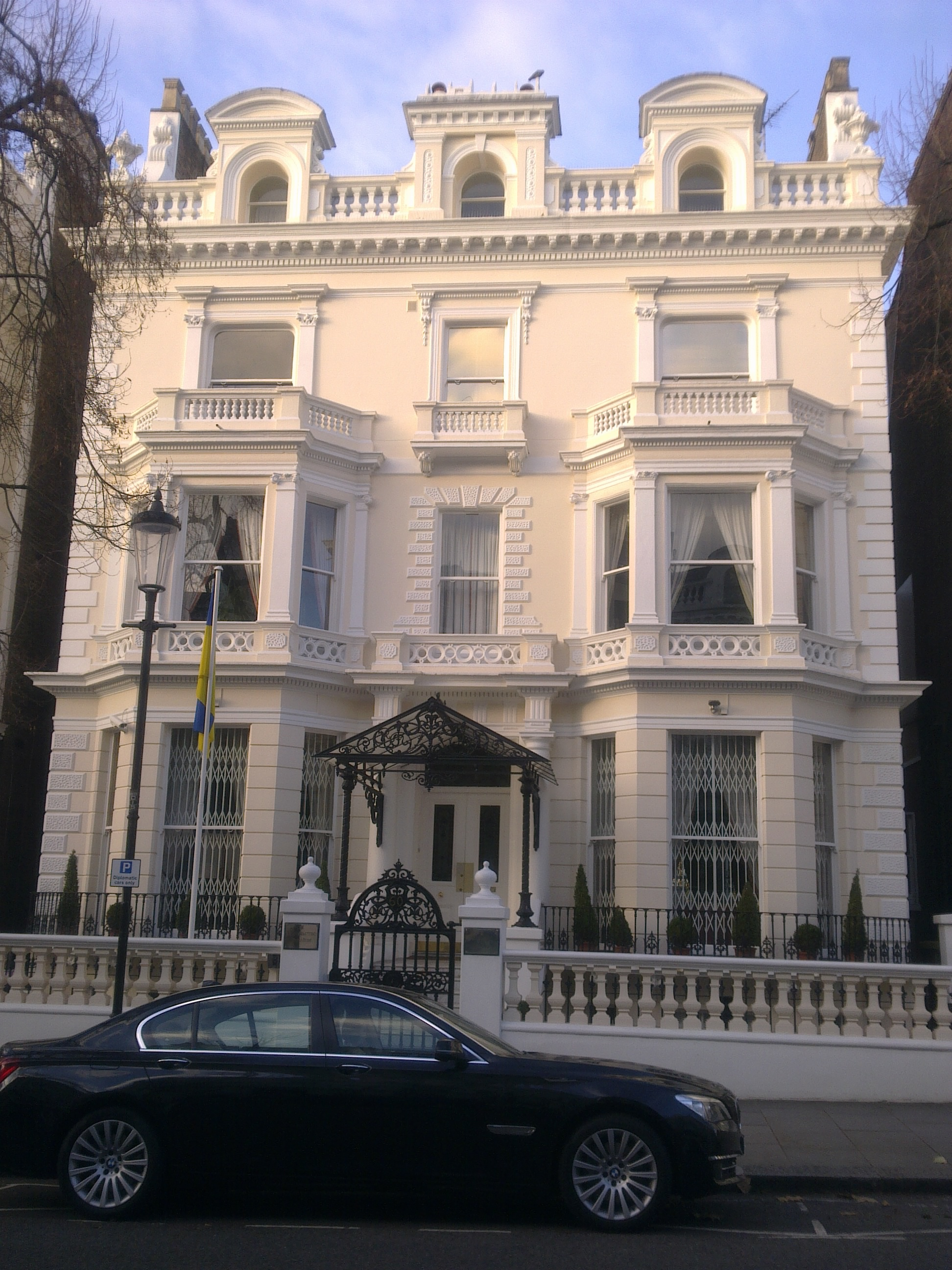
- The Embassy of Ukraine in Holland Park

- Location within Greater London
- OS grid reference: TQ246798
- London borough: Kensington & Chelsea
- Ceremonial county: Greater London
- Region: London
- Country: England
- Sovereign state: United Kingdom
- Post town: LONDON
- Postcode district: W8, W11, W14
- Dialling code: 020
- Police: Metropolitan
- Fire: London
- Ambulance: London
- UK Parliament: Kensington and Bayswater
- London Assembly: West Central

Holland Park is an area of Kensington, on the western edge of Central London, that lies within the Royal Borough of Kensington and Chelsea and largely surrounds its namesake park, Holland Park.

Holland Park contains some of the most expensive residential streets in London and the United Kingdom, including Addison Road, Holland Villas Road and Ilchester Place. Past and present residents include Sir David and Victoria Beckham, Sir Elton John, David Cameron, Ed Sheeran, Sir Richard Branson, and Robbie Williams, among others. The small neighbourhood is further home to the embassies of several countries, including Azerbaijan, Ukraine, Greece, Jordan, Russia and Lebanon.

The area is principally composed of tree-lined streets with large Victorian mansions and cultural tourist attractions such as the Design Museum and Leighton House, luxury spas, hotels, and restaurants along Holland Park Avenue and Kensington High Street.

== Location and boundaries ==
Holland Park is located between Notting Hill and South Kensington, west of Kensington Gardens and Hyde Park. While there are no official boundaries, the Holland Ward was historically bounded by Kensington High Street to the south, Holland Road to the west, Holland Park Avenue to the north, and Kensington Palace Gardens to the east.

Adjacent districts are Notting Hill to the north, Earl's Court to the south, and Shepherd's Bush to the west.

== History ==
A map showing the Holland ward of Kensington Metropolitan Borough as it appeared in 1916

The district was rural until the 19th century, and most of the area now referred to by the name Holland Park was formerly the grounds of a Jacobean mansion called Cope Castle, which today is known as Holland House. In the later decades of that century the owners of the house sold off the more outlying parts of its grounds for residential development, and the district which evolved took its name from the house. Large parts of Holland Park were constructed between 1860 and 1880 by master builders William and Francis Radford, who were contracted to build over 200 houses in the area. Notable 19th-century residential developments in the area include the Royal Crescent and Aubrey House. It also included some small areas around the fringes which had never been part of the grounds of Holland House, notably the Phillimore Estate (there are at least four roads with the word Phillimore in their name) and the Campden Hill Square area.

In the late 19th century, a number of notable artists and art collectors (including Frederic Leighton, P.R.A. and Val Prinsep), known as the Holland Park Circle, lived in the area, especially in Melbury Road and Holland Park Road.

=== Lansdowne House ===
Lansdowne House, at Lansdowne Road. is a Grade II listed eight-storey building which was originally constructed in 1902–04 by the Scottish architect William Flockhart, for the South African mining magnate Sir Edmund Davis. The building contained apartments and artists' workshops. Among the artists who had studios in the building in the early decades of the 20th century were Charles Ricketts, Charles Haslewood Shannon, Glyn Philpot, Vivian Forbes, James Pryde, and Frederick Cayley Robinson, who are commemorated on a blue plaque on the building.

The building underwent significant alterations. When, in 1957, the record producer Denis Preston was looking for a property in which to set up a recording studio, his assistant engineer Joe Meek found the premises, which had unusually high ceilings and a basement squash court, suitable for conversion into a studio. Preston, Meek and (a year later) the engineer Adrian Kerridge then established the studio, and made their first recordings there in 1958. The studio was London's first independent music recording studio. In 1962 an enlarged control room overlooking the studio floor was opened. Kerridge later became the studio's owner. The studios closed in 2006 and the building was subsequently converted into 13 self-contained apartments, while retaining a small recording studio.

== Governance ==
Holland Park is part of the Kensington and Bayswater constituency for elections to the House of Commons of the United Kingdom, represented by Labour MP Joe Powell since 2024.

Holland Park is part of the Holland ward for elections to Kensington and Chelsea London Borough Council.

== The public park ==
Holland Park
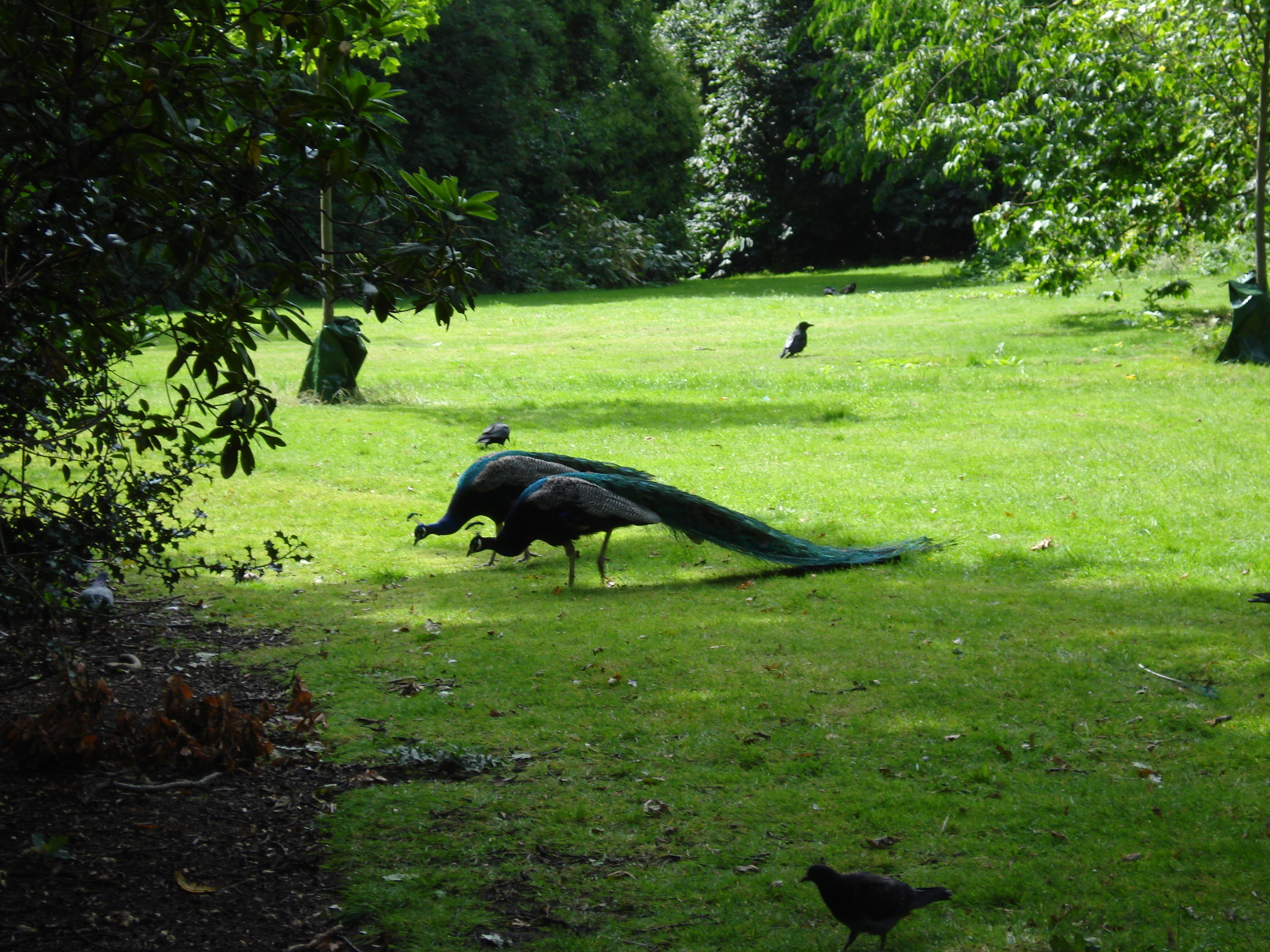
Peacocks in Holland Park

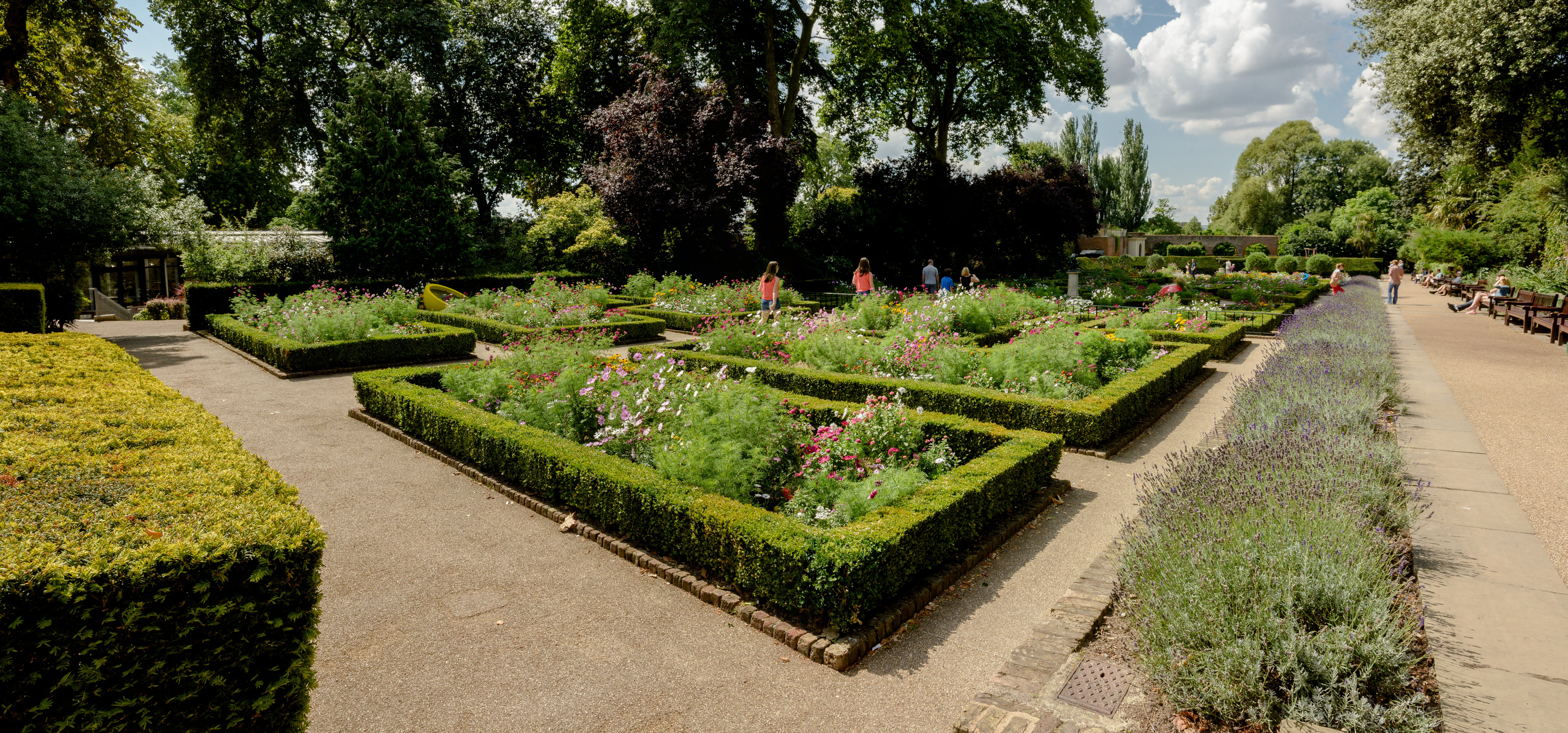
The formal gardens

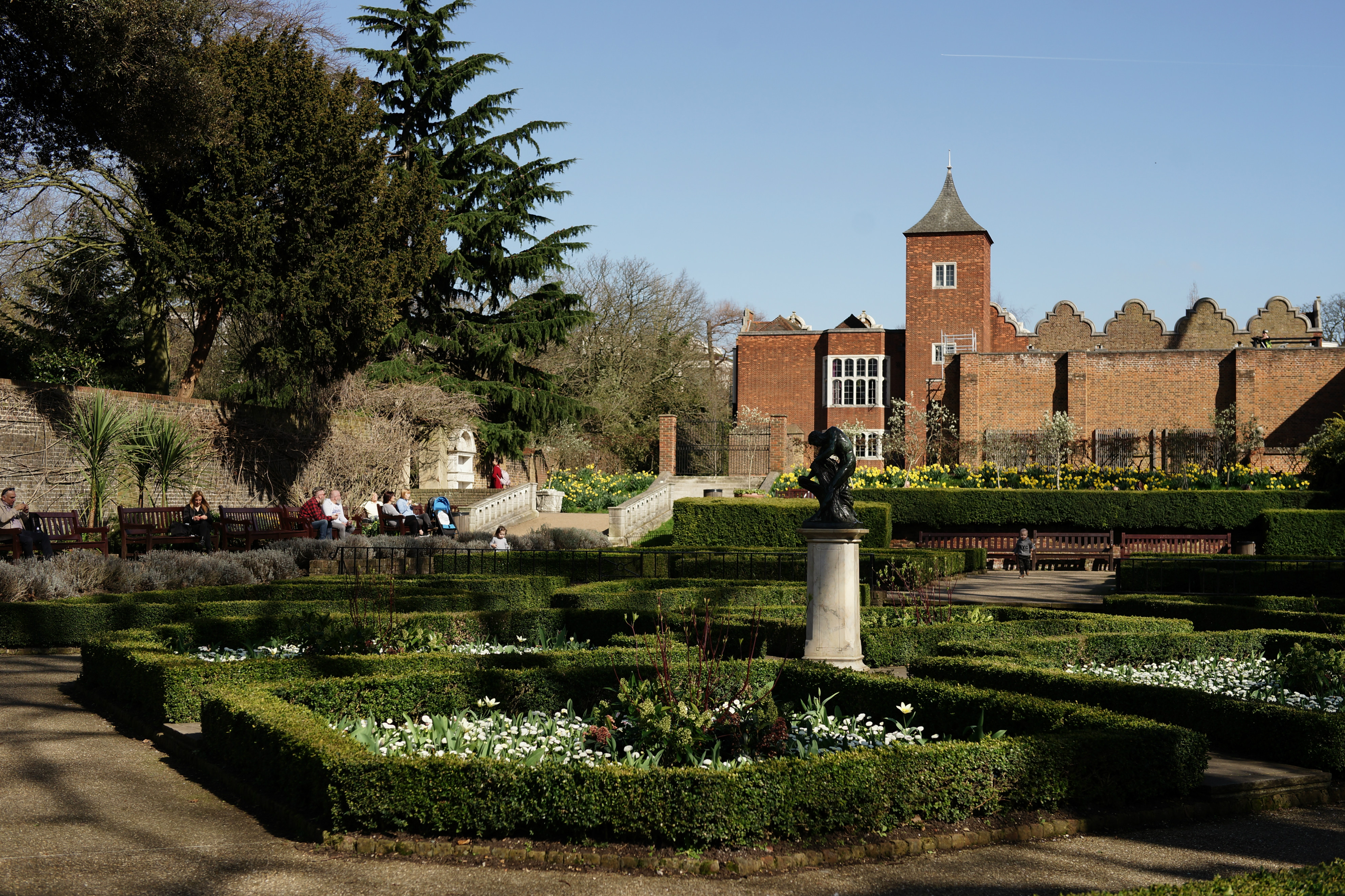
Formal gardens, looking towards Holland House

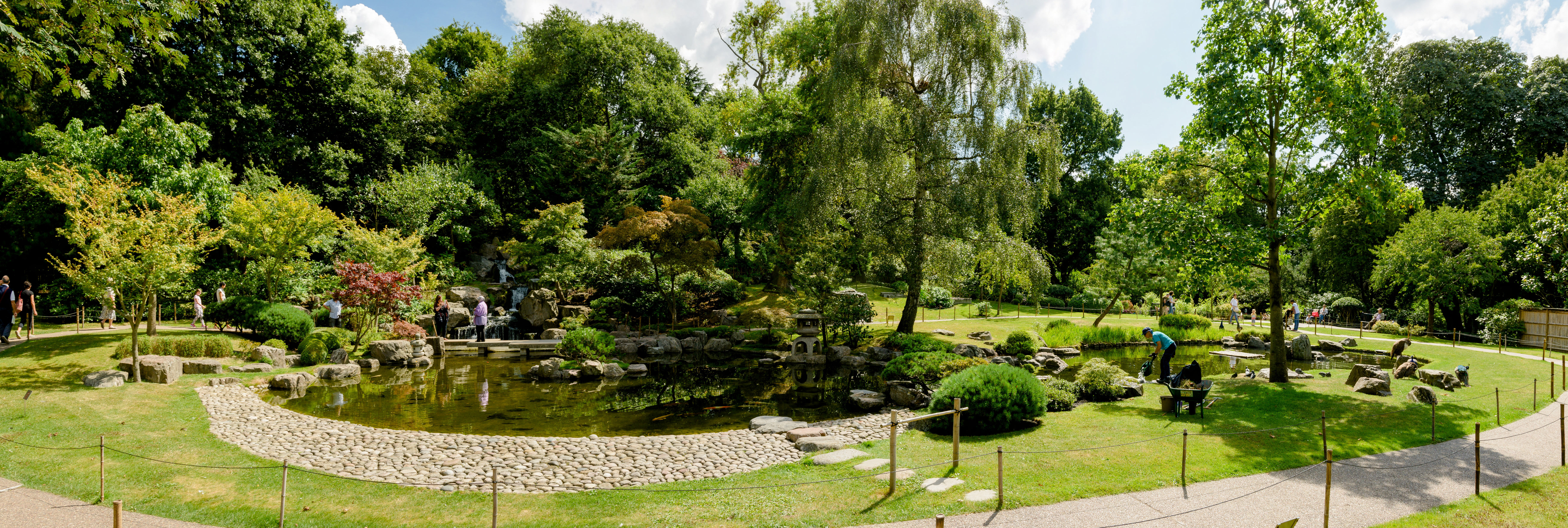
The Kyoto Garden

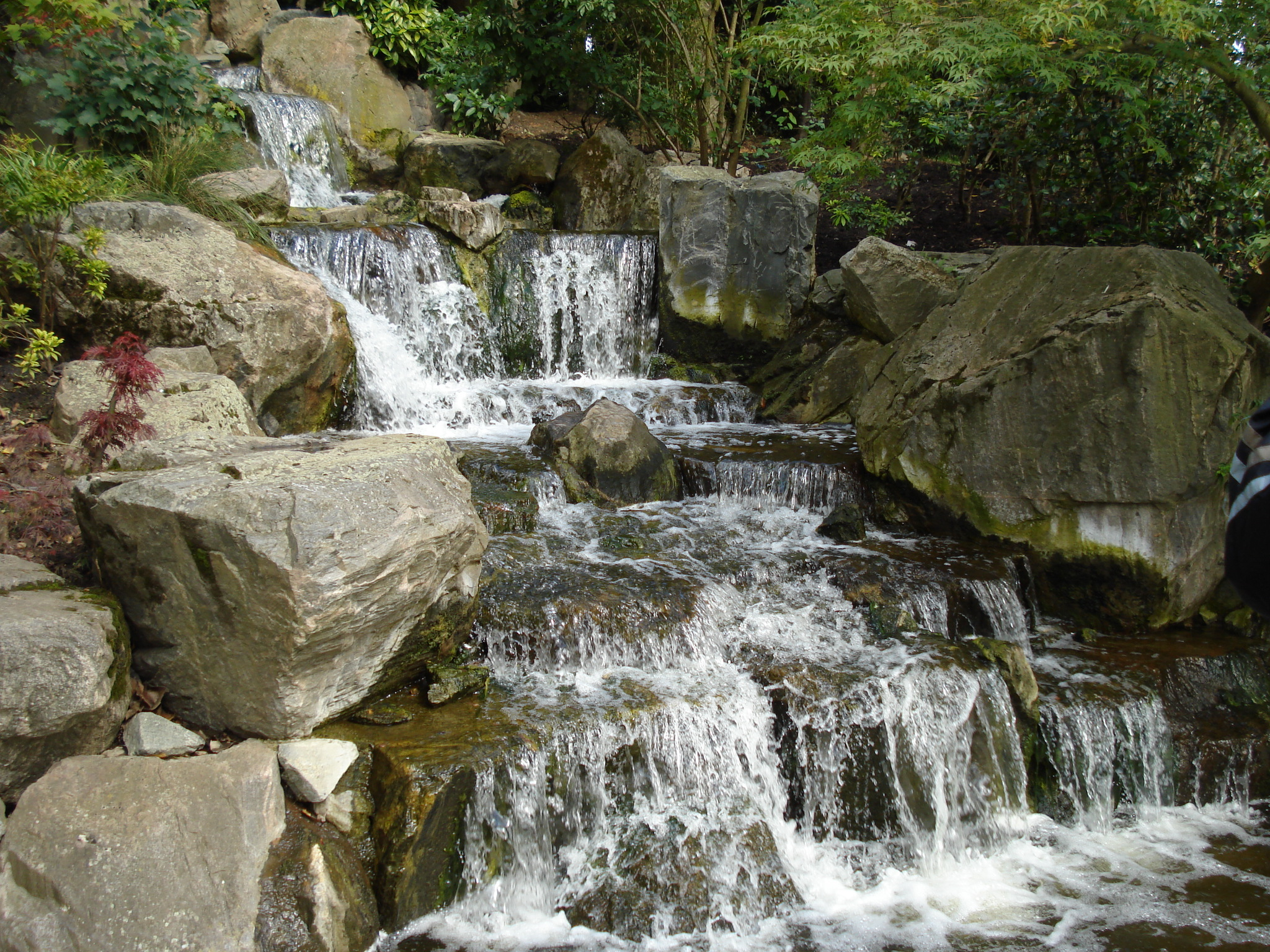
Kyoto Garden waterfall

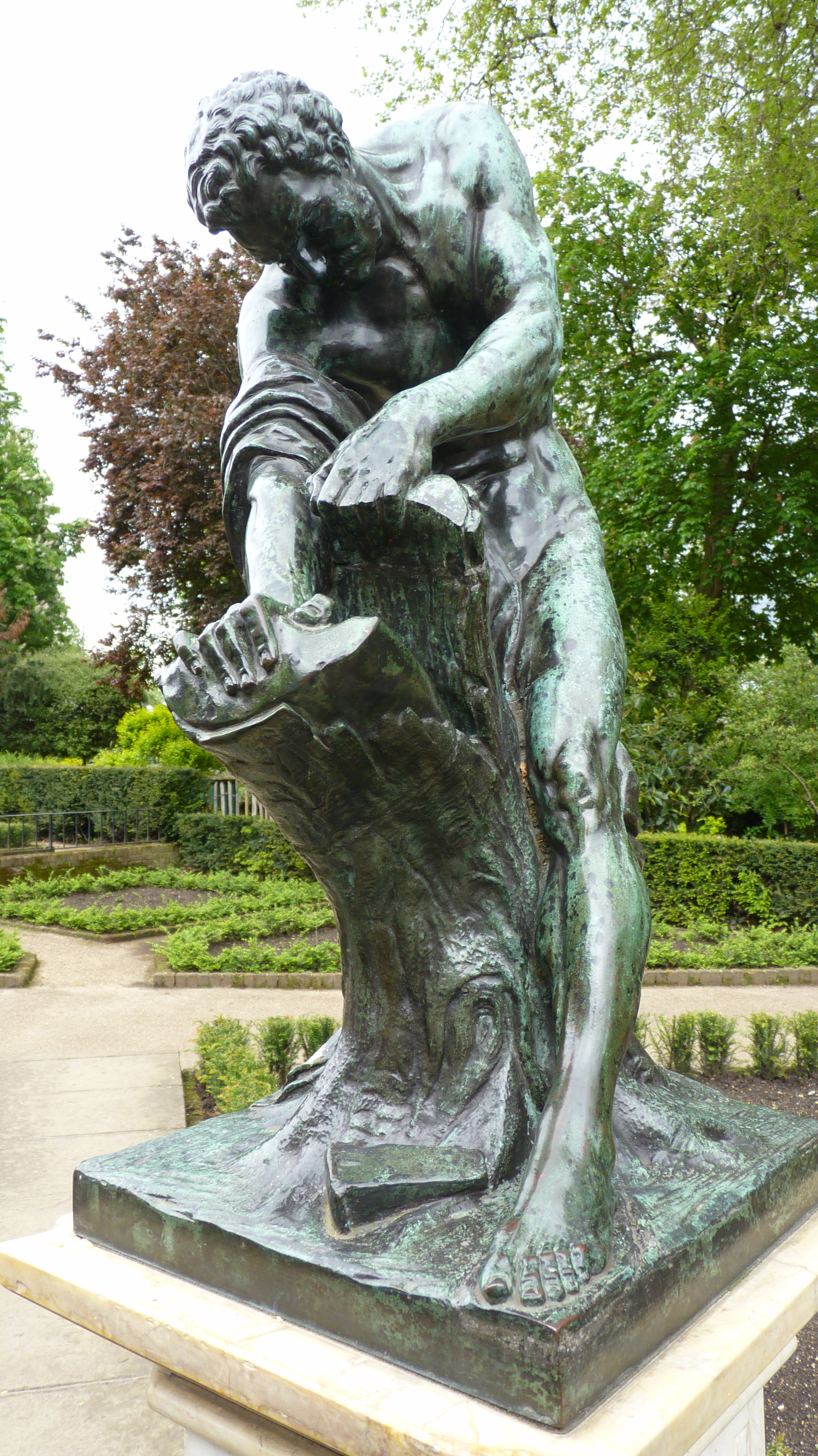
Statue of Milo of Croton

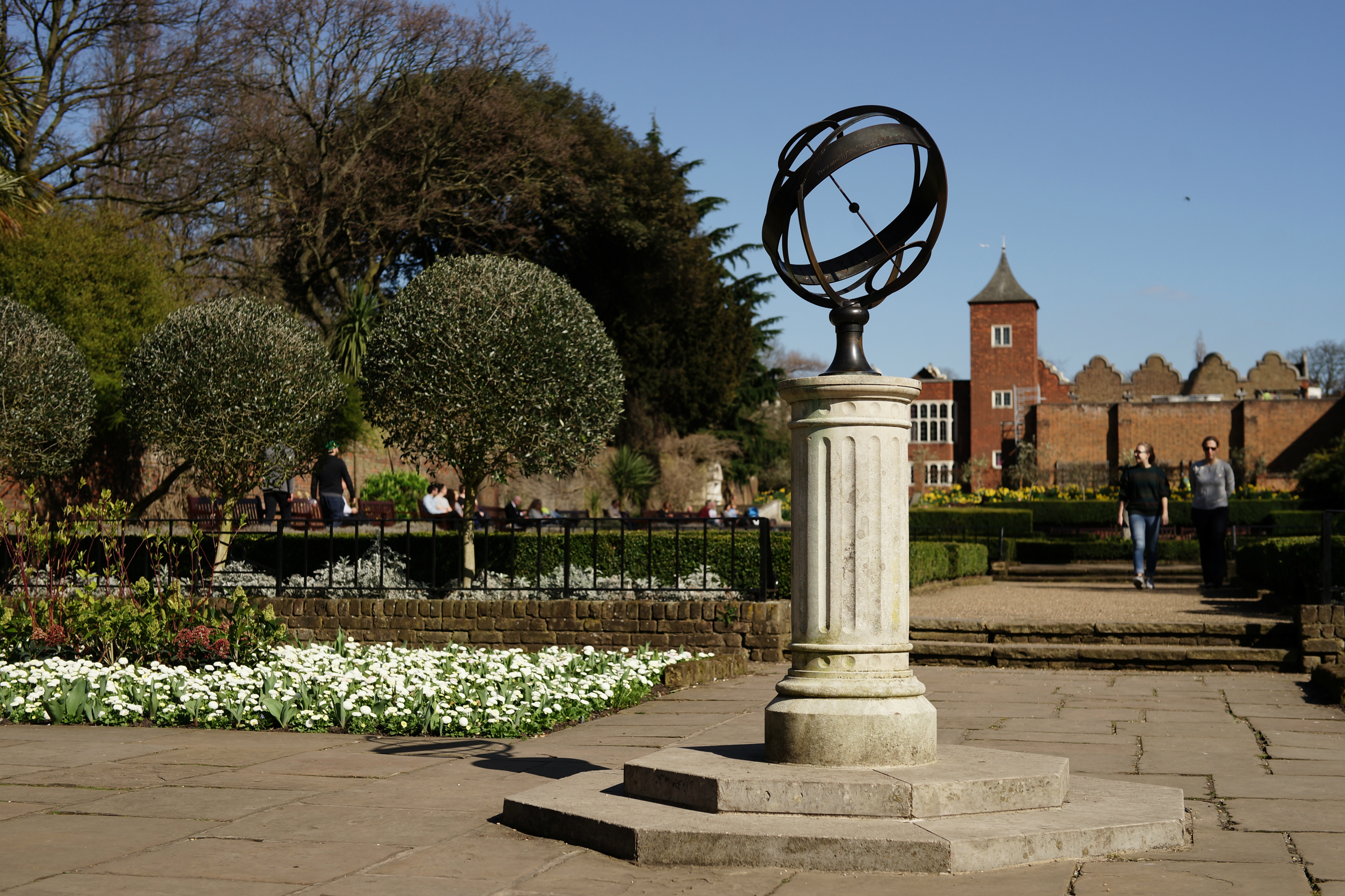
Armillary sphere sundial

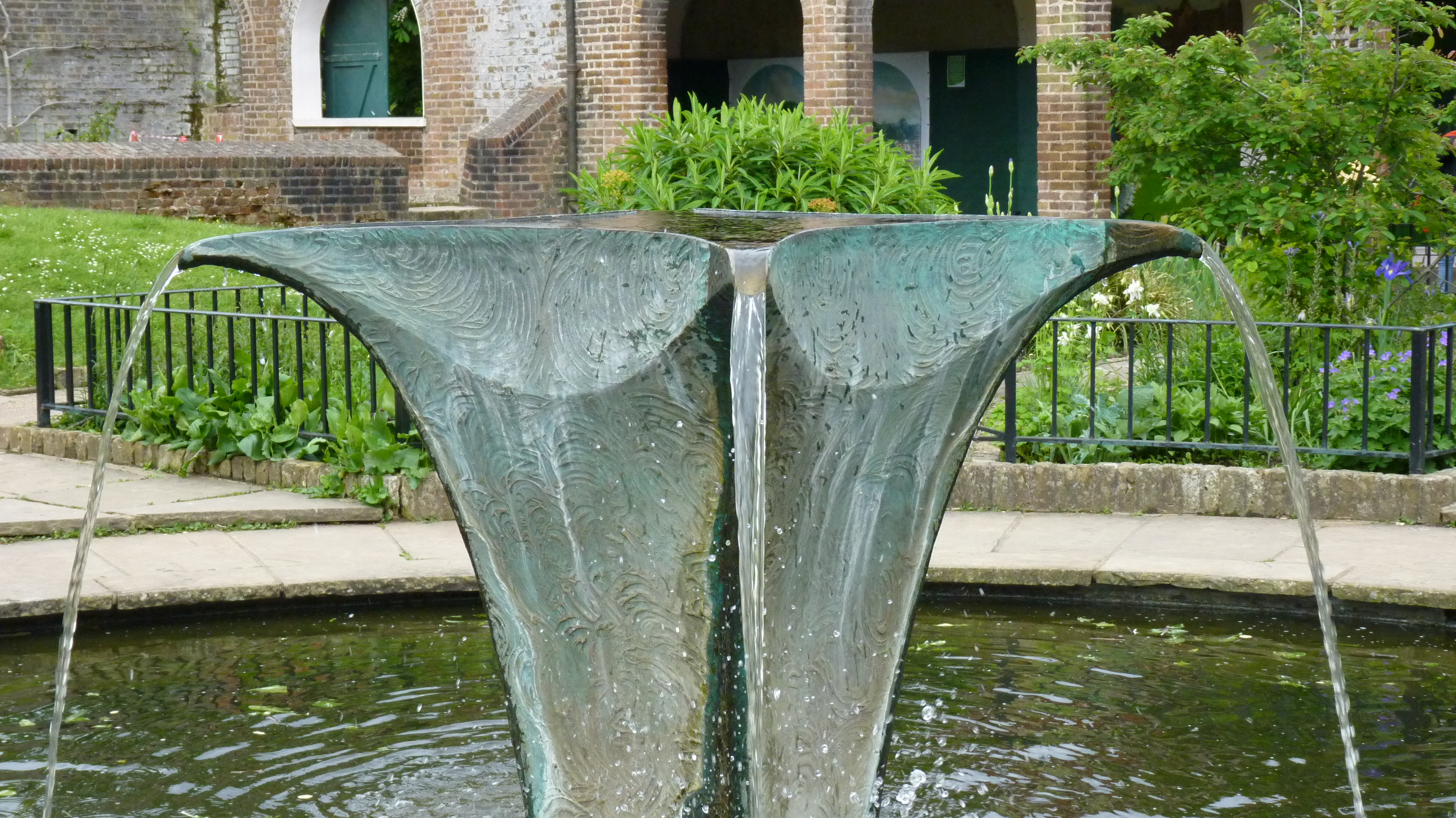
Fountain

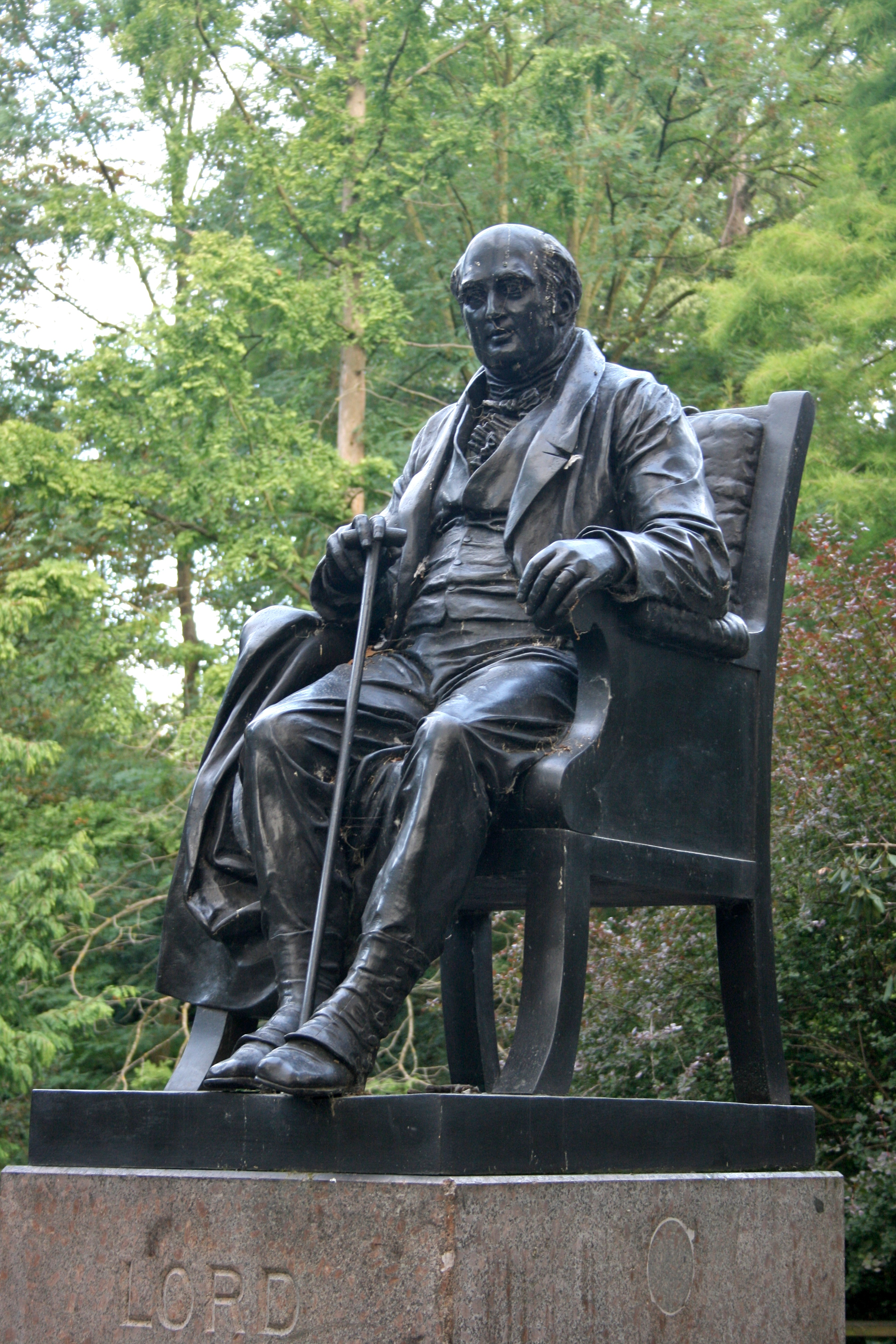
Statue of Lord Holland

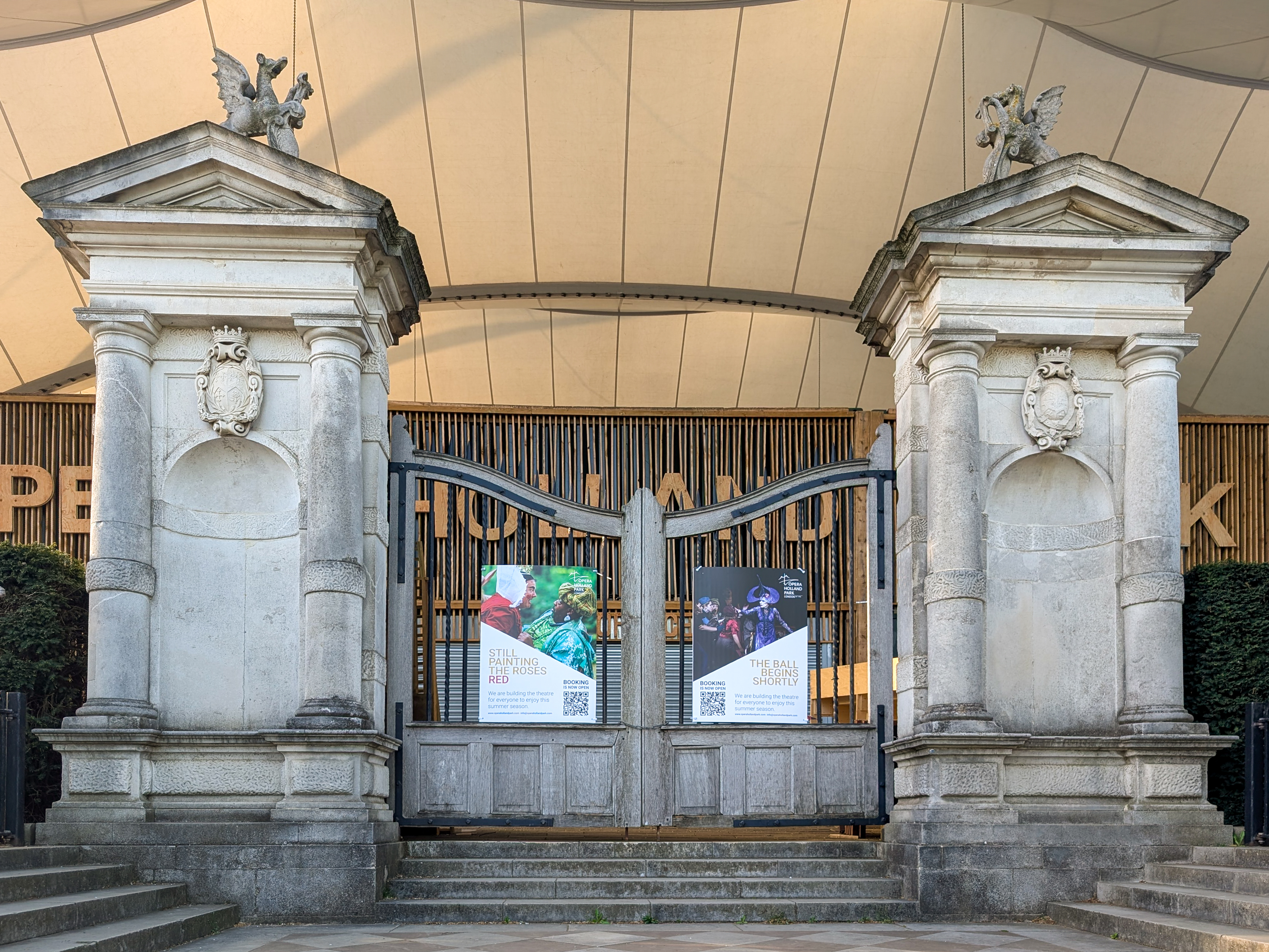
Grade I listed gate piers from 1629

The park covers about 22.5 hectares (56 acres), with a northern half of semi-wild woodland, central section of formal garden areas, and southernmost section used for sport.

Holland House is now a fragmentary ruin, having been devastated by incendiary bombing during the Second World War in 1940, but the ruins and the grounds were bought by London County Council in 1952 from the last private owner, the 6th Earl of Ilchester. Today the remains of the house form a backdrop for the open air Holland Park Theatre, which is the home of Opera Holland Park. To the north of the remains of Holland House is a statue to Lord Holland, and to the immediate south of the park is the former site of the Commonwealth Institute, now home to the Design Museum.

The park contains a café, as well as the Belvedere Restaurant that is attached to the orangery, a giant chess set, a cricket pitch, tennis courts, two Japanese gardens - the Kyoto Garden (1991) and Fukushima Memorial Garden (2012), a youth hostel, a children's playground, squirrels and peacocks. In 2010 the park set aside a section for pigs whose job was to reclaim the area from nettles etc., in order to create another meadow area for wildflowers and fauna. Cattle were used subsequently to similar effect.

The Holland Park Ecology Centre (2013), operated by the borough's Ecology Service, provides environmental education programmes including nature walks, talks, programmes for schools, and outdoor activity programs for children.

In the northwest of the park near Abbotsbury Road, installed in 2000, is the outdoor sculpture Tortoises with Triangle and Time by Wendy Taylor, commissioned by the Royal Borough of Kensington and Chelsea for the Millennium celebrations.

== Places of Interest ==
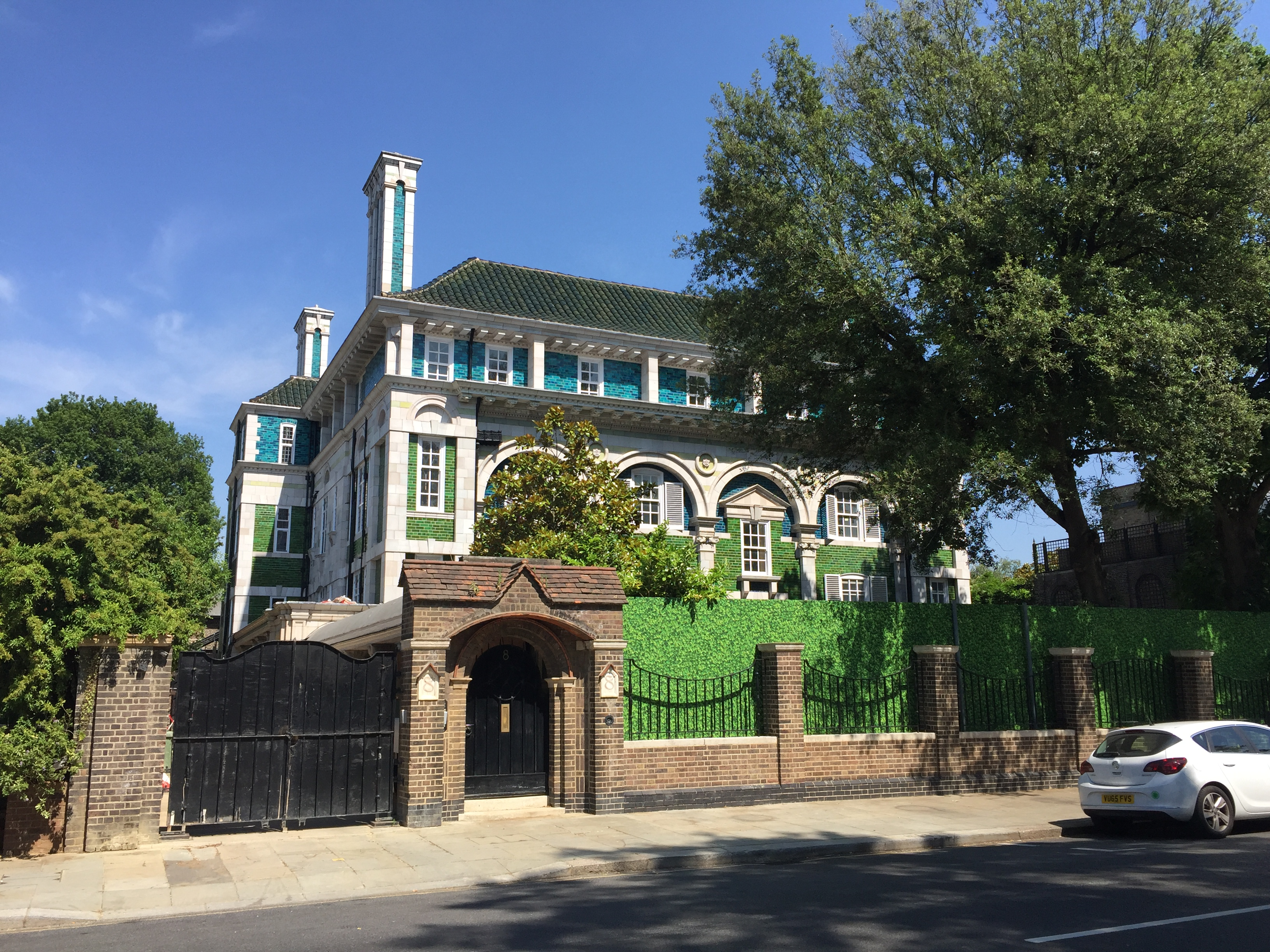
Debenham House

- Aubrey House, large 18th-century detached house with two acres of garden, now a private residence
- Debenham House, large 20th-century detached house in the Arts and Crafts style by the architect Halsey Ricardo
- Design Museum, large museum exhibiting product, industrial, graphic, fashion, and architectural design
- Holland House, historic estate situated within the public Holland Park
- Holland Park School, modern coeducational secondary school
- Ilchester Place, frequently ranking as Britain's 'most expensive street'
- Leighton House Museum, art museum and historic house formerly belonging to Frederic Leighton, 1st Baron Leighton
- Opera Holland Park, summer opera company producing annual seasons of opera performances at Holland House in the park
- The Tower House, privately owned Gothic revival mansion built by the architect William Burges
- Woodland House, large detached mansion by the architect Richard Norman Shaw
