= Cyril Leonard =

British property firm

- Type: Private
- Industry: Real Estate
- Founded: 1934 in London, England
- Founders: Cyril and Leonard Blausten
- Headquarters: Mayfair, London, United Kingdom
- Area served: UK, Europe, and the US
- Owners: Mark Harrison, Simon Rooke & Jonathan Slater
- Website: www.cyrilleonard.com

Cyril Leonard is one of London's longest-established property firms and has grown from a small family concern at formation in 1934 to an international consultancy handling all forms of commercial property with a reach across the United Kingdom, Europe, and the United States.

== History ==
The firm was founded by the brothers Cyril and Leonard Blausten as surveyors in 1934 at the Angel in north London. Then with one month’s free rent courtesy of their father and an Olympia typewriter as working capital, the business began and has continued ever since.

Within ten years, they opened a second office at 52 Brook Street in the West End of London during the Second World War, giving the two brothers an opportunity to begin their careers in development. It was in these early post-war years that Cyril Blausten formed friendships with other people involved with London property: Harold Samuel, Maxwell Joseph, Max Rayne, Jack Salmon and Jack Cotton.

In the period between 1959 and 1961, over 25 property companies came to the London Stock Market. For the Blausten brothers, their first public vehicle was Simo Securities Trust, formerly an Indonesian Rubber Company shell. From then on a string of development projects in London, Guildford, Manchester, and other areas were completed as the company became part of the effort to regenerate Britain.

By 1970, Simo had grown to include, by acquisition, a merchant bank and a Lloyds Underwriting Agency. Just as Simo was turning into a property-based financial conglomerate the company succumbed to a hostile takeover bid from Town and Commercial Properties.

The physical devastation in post-war Britain's major cities had presented a financial problem for the governments of Winston Churchill and Clement Attlee. However, the period was a good opportunity for young entrepreneurs to take the lead, and so they did in an unprecedented way in Europe. Many, either refugees or sons of refugees, found freedom and sanctuary from persecution in the UK and began a development drive that lasted through to 1974 as the country was rebuilt.

In addition to commercial and corporate activity, Cyril Blausten formed a business relationship with George Wimpey and through Winglaw Properties together developed and regenerated 8 acres (32,000 m^{2}) of land on the Ilchester Estate in Abbotsbury Road and St Mary Abbots Terrace on Kensington High Street.

Cyril Blausten himself found time to devote to the Jewish Board of Guardians, now Jewish Care, becoming Hon Secretary, Vice Chairman and Vice President. As Chairman of the Property Committee, he helped oversee one of the largest residential care home development programmes after the war.

From the mid-1970s, Cyril Blausten concentrated on his private property investment companies, his financial investments and Cyril Leonard from which he retired as Senior Partner in 1996, remaining as a Consultant until 2000. Cyril Blausten died in December 2006. Douglas and Simon, two of his four sons remained senior partners within the firm and they were joined in the Partnership by Andrew Hogge who focussed on the transactional side, including Investment, Development & central London occupational markets.

The Partnership remained in place for around 30 years until 2015 when a planned Management Buy Out took place and the Firm became a Limited Company. Andrew and Simon remained as Directors and were joined by Mark Harrison, Simon Rooke, Jonathan Slater & Oliver Spero who had been senior members of staff within the Capital Markets and Building Consultancy departments.

The phased MBO completed in 2020, in the middle of the Covid crisis and lockdown via a number of video conference calls, such as became the order of the day! Andrew & Simon remain with the business as Consultants, whilst three directors; Mark Harrison, Simon Rooke & Jonathan Slater, continue to lead the company’s day-to-day operations and drive its ongoing growth and strategic direction.

== Cyril Leonard today ==
The firm operates from offices in Fitzrovia, London where it works with a variety of clients both in the UK and around the world. Clients include ALSTOM, AEA Technology, Abbott Laboratories, and Royal London, and services range from investment and asset management to building and corporate consultancy, development funding and leasing.

== Directors ==
Cyril Leonard Ltd's Directors are Mark Harrison, Simon Rooke and Jonathan Slater.
