= Virginia Quay Settlers Monument =

Memorial in London

Coordinates: 51°30′29″N 0°00′01″E

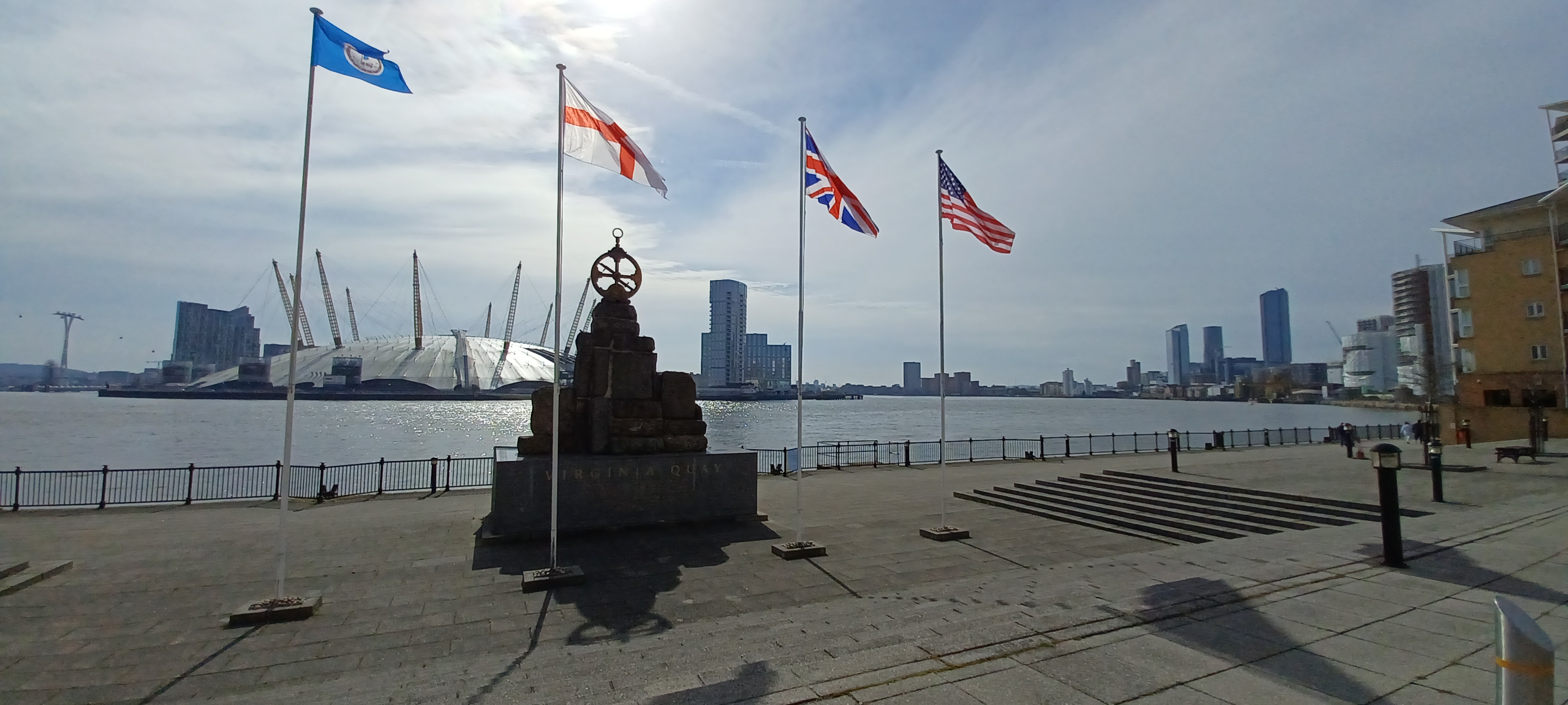
The land-facing side of the monument

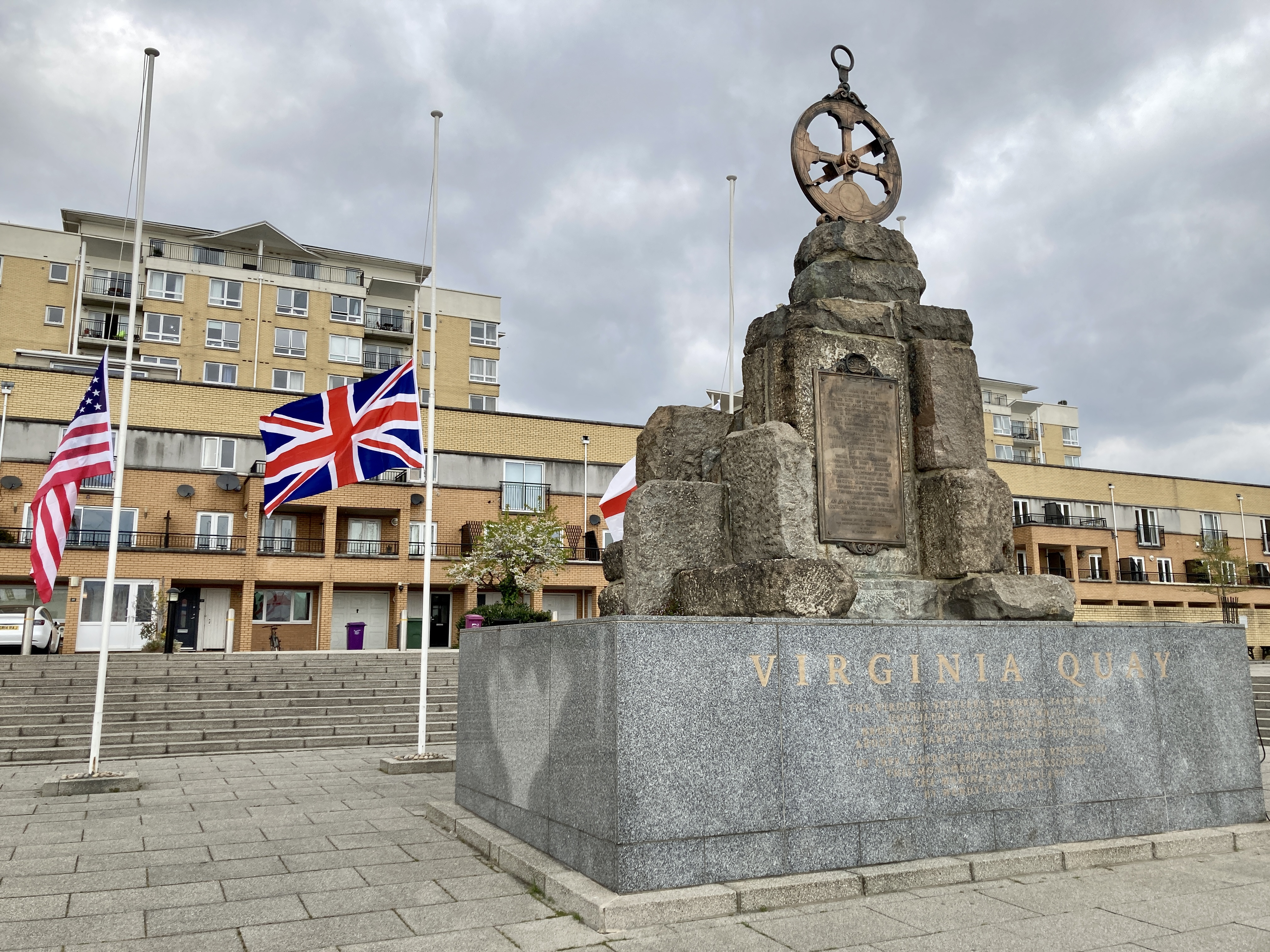
The river-facing side of the monument. The flags are at half-mast for the death of Prince Philip.

The Virginia Quay Settlers Monument is a public monument in Blackwall, London, to the first settlers of the Colony of Virginia who departed from here in 1606. The monument has its origins in a plaque erected on the Brunswick Dock master's house in 1928. The house was badly damaged by bombing during the Second World War and in 1951 the plaque was incorporated into a monument erected during development of the site into the Brunswick Wharf Power Station. The monument was designed by Harold Brown and consisted of rough-hewn granite blocks from the walls of the West India Docks surmounted by a bronze sculpture of a mermaid. The mermaid was later stolen. The monument was refurbished by Barratt Homes during redevelopment in 1999. A polished granite plinth was added and the mermaid replaced by a mariner's astrolabe sculpted by Wendy Taylor. The monument is currently located on the riverside facing the Millennium Dome.

== Background ==
Virginia Quay was originally known as Blackwall, a small and isolated settlement in marshy surroundings. A causeway led to the Blackwall Stairs, a slipway and staircase providing access to the river. It was used as a departure point for several explorers including Martin Frobisher for his second expedition to the north-west passage and associated with shipbuilding in the area. The site was the location for the departure of the expedition that founded the Colony of Virginia in the modern-day United States. The expedition's three vessels, the Susan Constant, Discovery and the Godspeed left from this point on 19 December 1606. The expedition went on to found Jamestown, the first permanent English settlement in the Americas.

== First plaque ==
Blackwall became the site of the Brunswick (East India Export) Dock in 1806. In 1928 a bronze plaque was erected on the dock master's house (Brunswick House, located around 100 yards (91 m) west of the current location of the monument) by an organisation named by Historic England as both the Society for the Protection of West Virginia Artefacts and the Association for the Preservation of Virginia Antiquities. The plaque recorded the departure from this site of "105 adventurers". It names the captains of the ships (Christopher Newport, Bartholomew Gosnold and John Ratcliffe) and mentions the founding of Jamestown in April 1607 by Captain John Smith, Edward Maria Wingfield and Robert Hunt. It also noted that Jamestown was the site, on 30 July 1619, of the first democratic assembly held in America (the House of Burgesses).

== Monument ==
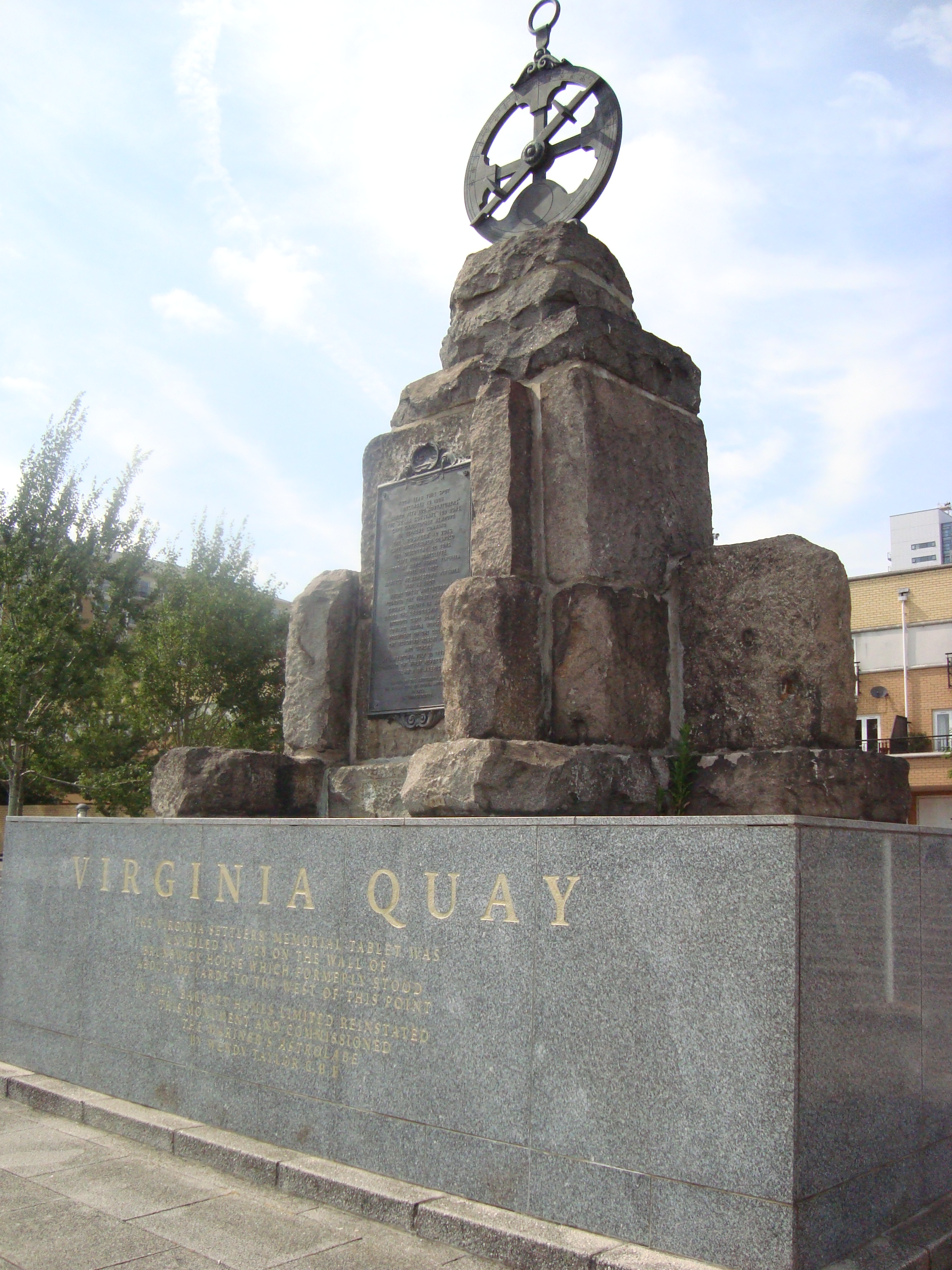
The original monument sits atop a later plinth

Brunswick House was damaged by German bombing during the Second World War and was later demolished. The plaque was saved and in 1951 added to a monument which was donated by the Port of London Authority. During this time the East India Export Dock was being backfilled to provide land for the Brunswick Wharf Power Station. The monument was designed by Harold Brown and consisted of a pile of rough granite blocks "hewn from the old quay wall of the historic West India Docks". It was topped by a bronze statue of a mermaid sat in a shell. The granite was meant to represent the resilience of the first settlers and the mermaid represented the "call of the sea". The monument was unveiled by the United States ambassador to Britain Walter Sherman Gifford. The mermaid was later stolen; it was recovered from auction around 2007 but not reinstated.

== Renovation ==
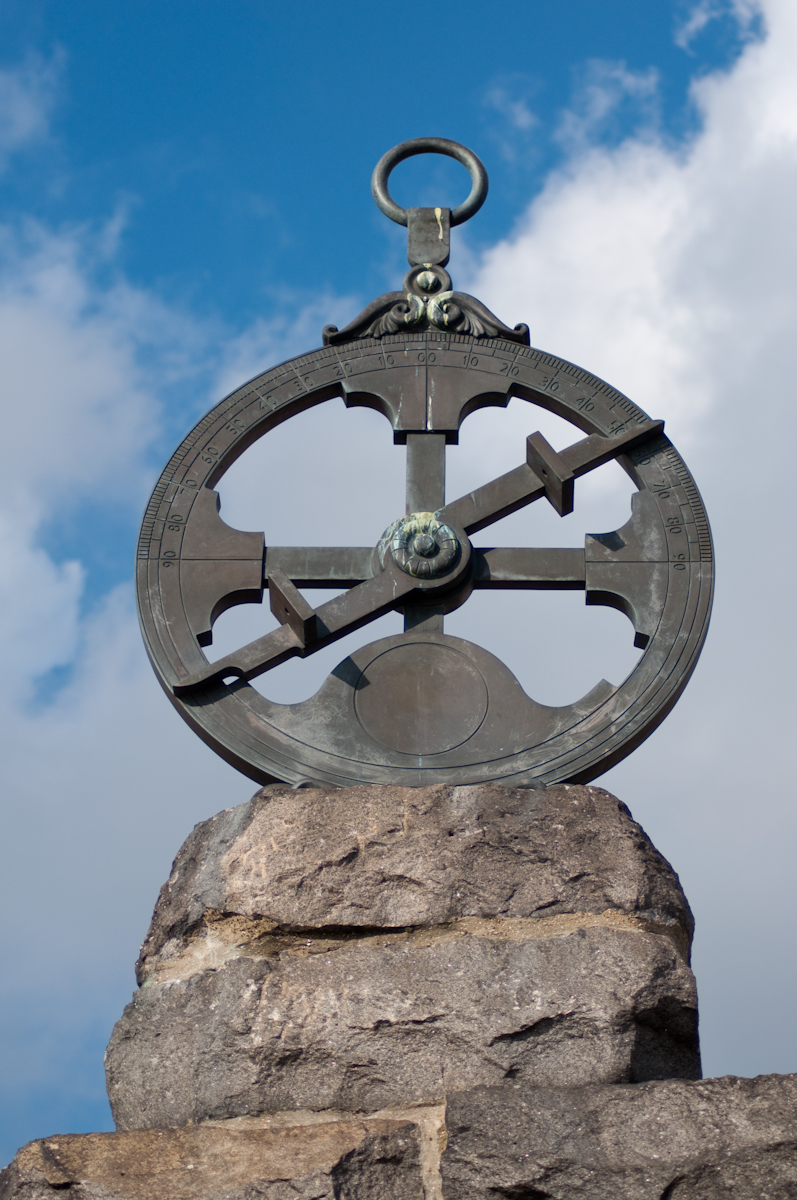
Detail of the 1999 astrolabe

The power station was demolished in 1988–89 and the site was later developed by Barratt Homes. In 1999 Barratt resited the monument onto a paved terrace on the riverbank, opposite the Millennium Dome. The missing mermaid was replaced by a bronze sculpture of a mariner's astrolabe, a navigation instrument the expedition would have used, designed by Wendy Taylor. Barratt also added a polished granite plinth with an inscription noting the work done and the relocation of the monument. The renovated monument was unveiled by the US ambassador to Britain Philip Lader in a ceremony supported by the Jamestowne Society and featuring a marchpast by pike and musket re-enactors. The site originally had three flagpoles which were used to fly two flags of the United States and the Union Flag; it now has four flagpoles which fly one of each of the flags plus the flag of England and the flag of Virginia.

Barratt themed their development around the association with Virginia. The streets were named after Jamestown, Newport and the Pilgrims. Later housing developments by the Ballymore Group at nearby New Providence Wharf also use Virginia-themed names.

The monument was granted statutory protection as a grade II listed building by Historic England on 9 March 2017. The organisation considers that as well as its own significance the monument has value in association with the statue of Pocahontas further downriver at Gravesend, Kent, (Pocahontas has been closely associated with Smith). Other nearby listed structures are also mentioned in the listing, including the Blackwall Engineering Dry Dock and the Blackwall Pier and entrance lock (belonging to the former East India Dock basin).
