= Ilchester Place =

Street in London, England

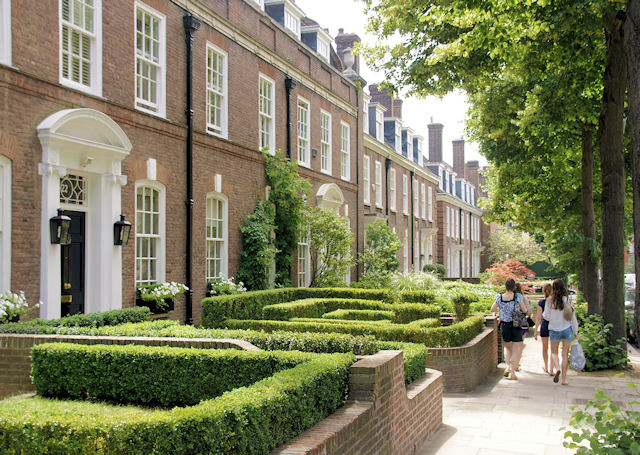
- Looking along houses in Ilchester Place
- Interactive map of Ilchester Place
- Former name: Holland Lane
- Namesake: Ilchester Estate
- Type: Street
- Area: Holland Park
- Location: Royal Borough of Kensington and Chelsea, London, England
- Postal code: W14 8AA, W14 8ND, W14 8NH
- Nearest metro station: High Street Kensington tube station, Holland Park tube station
- Coordinates: 51.5004°N 0.2039°W
- West end: Abbotsbury Road
- South end: Melbury Road
- North: Holland Park (park)
- East: Holland Park (park)
- South: Melbury Road
- West: Abbotsbury Road

Construction
- Completion: 1928

Other
- Designer: Leonard Martin
- Known for: Expensive houses

Ilchester Place is a street in the Holland Park area of Kensington, West London, England.

Formerly known as Holland Lane, Ilchester Place was completed in 1928, designed by Leonard Martin (1869–1935).

Ilchester Place runs from Abbotsbury Road to the west, turning south to join Melbury Road. Large expensive houses on the north side of the street back onto Holland Park itself. In December 2021, it was named the sixth most expensive street in the UK, with an average house price of £16.3 million.
