= Statue of Lord Holland =

Statue in Holland Park, London

Coordinates: 51.5042°N 0.2034°W

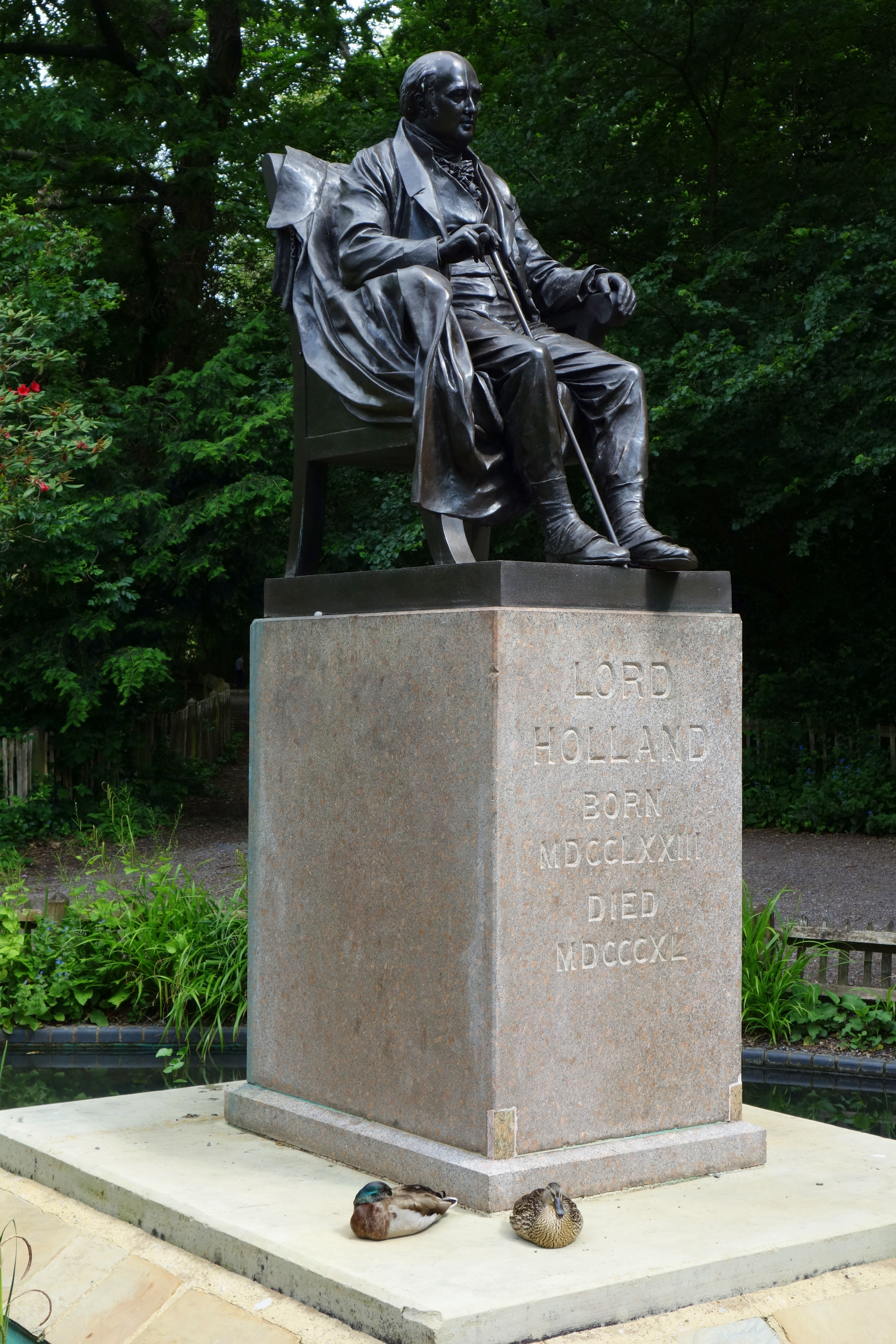
- Statue of Henry Fox, 3rd Lord Holland, Holland Park, in London
- Artist: George Frederic Watts and Joseph Edgar Boehm
- Completion date: 1870
- Subject: Henry Fox, 3rd Baron Holland
- Location: London

Listed Building – Grade II
- Official name: Statue of Lord Holland
- Designated: 15 April 1969
- Reference no.: 1223782

The Statue of Lord Holland is a Grade II listed statue in Holland Park in London, on the northern walk out of the remains of Holland House.

Lord Holland was a significant Whig politician, whose family's nearby Holland House served as a venue of congregations among politicians and scholars of the time. Holland was politically radical, with sympathies towards France and an abolitionist stance. Being unable to make the post of Foreign Secretary, Holland was happy to support subversive causes at Holland House, where Holland would be known as "perhaps the greatest host in English history".

The statue was erected in 1870, designed by George Frederic Watts, who himself lived in the grounds of Holland House, and Joseph Edgar Boehm. Watts worked to create the clay model and Boehm would complete the casting. Holland is depicted sitting back in a chair and holding a walking stick, characteristic of Holland as a long-time sufferer of gout. The statue was funded with money left over from what was raised for a monument dedicated to him in Westminster Abbey.
