= Tortoises with Triangle and Time =

Outdoor sculpture in Holland Park, London

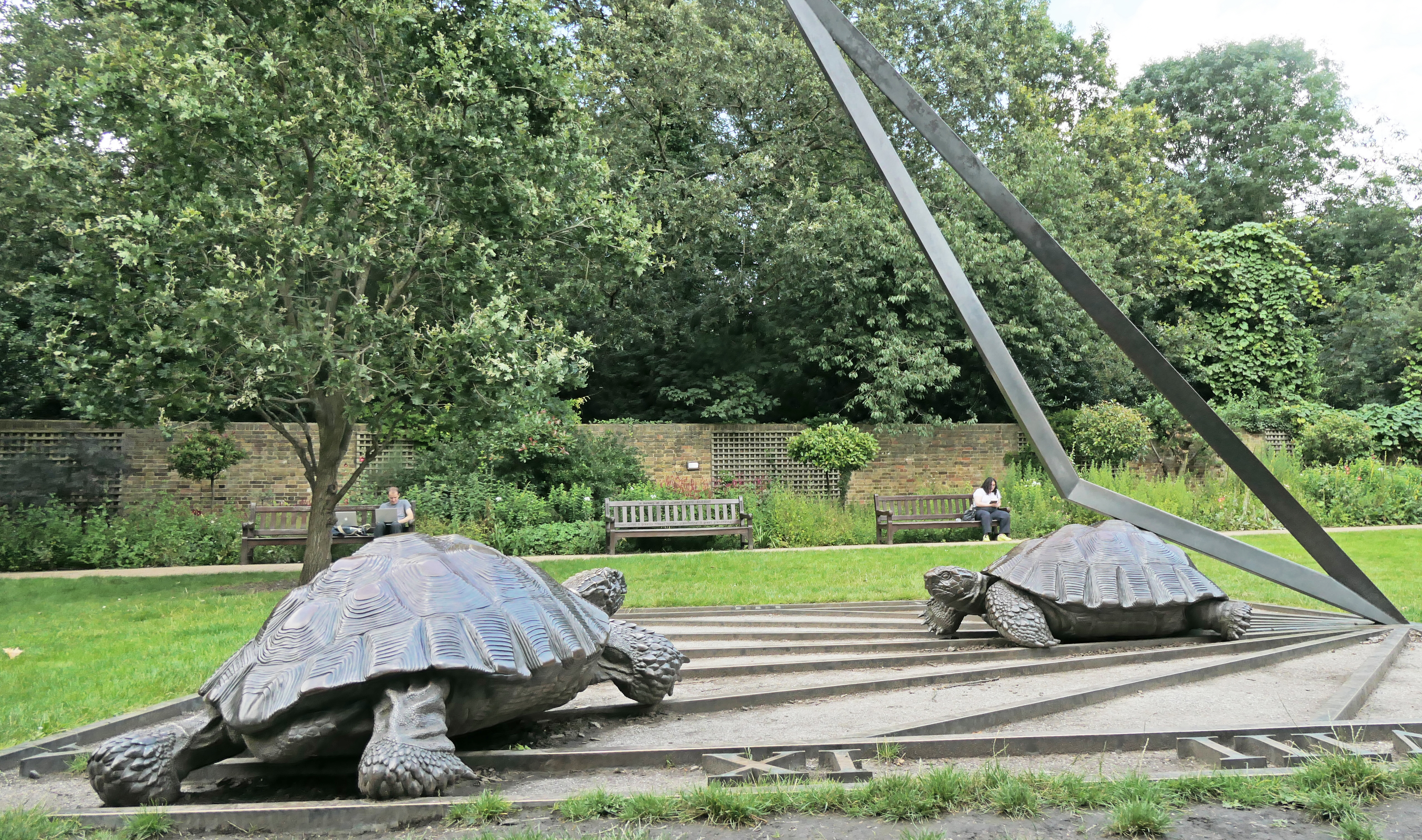
- Artist: Wendy Taylor
- Year: 2000
- Medium: Bronze sculpture
- Subject: Tortoises with a sundial
- Dimensions: 549 cm × 660 cm × 619 cm (216 in × 260 in × 244 in)
- Location: London
- Coordinates: 51°30′13.39″N 0°12′26.35″W
- Owner: Royal Borough of Kensington and Chelsea
- Accession: W1_JR_S003
- Website: wendytaylorsculpture.co.uk/work/tortoises-with-triangle-and-time/

Tortoises with Triangle and Time is an outdoor bronze sculpture in Holland Park, Kensington, London, England, adjacent to Abbotsbury Road. The work is by the sculptor Wendy Taylor and was created in 2000 to celebrate the Millennium. It features two tortoises and a large triangle that forms a sundial.

The sculpture is 549cm height × 660cm width × 619cm depth. It was commissioned by the Royal Borough of Kensington and Chelsea and Sculpture at Goodwood.

== See also ==
- List of public art in Kensington § Holland Park
