= Abbotsbury Road =

Road in Holland Park, London, England

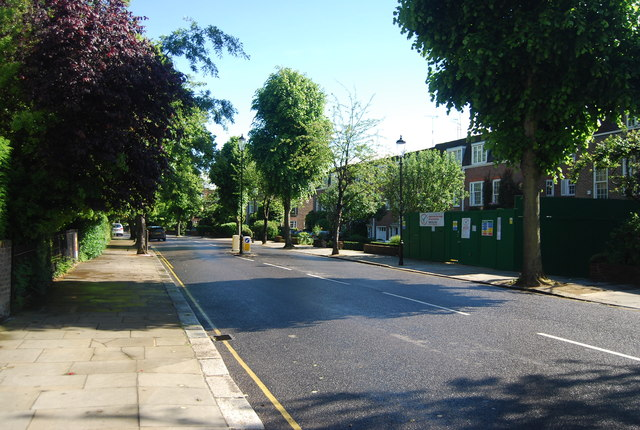
- Looking along Abbotsbury Road

- Location within Greater London
- Namesake: Abbotsbury, Dorset
- Type: Street
- Area: Holland Park
- Location: Royal Borough of Kensington and Chelsea, London, England
- Postal code: W14
- Nearest metro station: Holland Park tube station
- Coordinates: 51.50116°N 0.20583°W
- North end: Holland Park
- Major junctions: Ilchester Place, Oakwood Court, Oakwood Lane, Abbotsbury Close
- South end: Melbury Road
- North: Holland Park (street)
- East: Holland Park (park)
- South: Melbury Road
- West: Abbotsbury Close

Construction
- Commissioned: 1905
- Construction start: c.1924 (houses)
- Completion: 1960s

Other
- Designer: Stone, Toms and Partners (1950s/1960s)
- Known for: Holland Park, Tortoises with Triangle and Time

Abbotsbury Road is a residential road in the Holland Park area of the Royal Borough of Kensington and Chelsea, West London, England.

The road links the street Holland Park to the north with Melbury Road to the south, known for the Holland Park Circle of artists. There is a junction with Ilchester Place to the east. The parkland of Holland Park itself runs along the east side of the street for much of its length, with three entrances to the park.

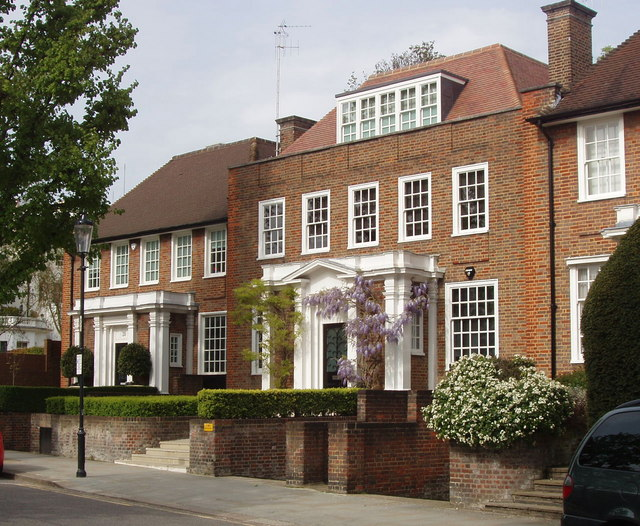
Houses on Abbotsbury Road

Abbortsbury Road has existed since 1905. The southern part of Abbotsbury Road, named after a Dorset estate belonging to the Earl of Ilchester, was created at the same time as Oakwood Court. Only a few houses were built before World War II (odd Nos 3–9 in c.1924; even Nos 8–10 and 24–28 in the 1930s). During the 1950s and 1960s, there was extensive building in the street. All the houses and flats on the west side of Abbotsbury Road to the north of Oakwood Court (odd Nos 17–137), in the adjoining Abbotsbury Close (Nos 1–66), and Abbotsbury House (a 10-storey block of flats), were built during this period by Wates Limited, designed by Stone, Toms and Partners.

The Maharishi Mahesh Yogi Meditation Centre was located in Abbotsbury Road and The Beatles visited in 1967.

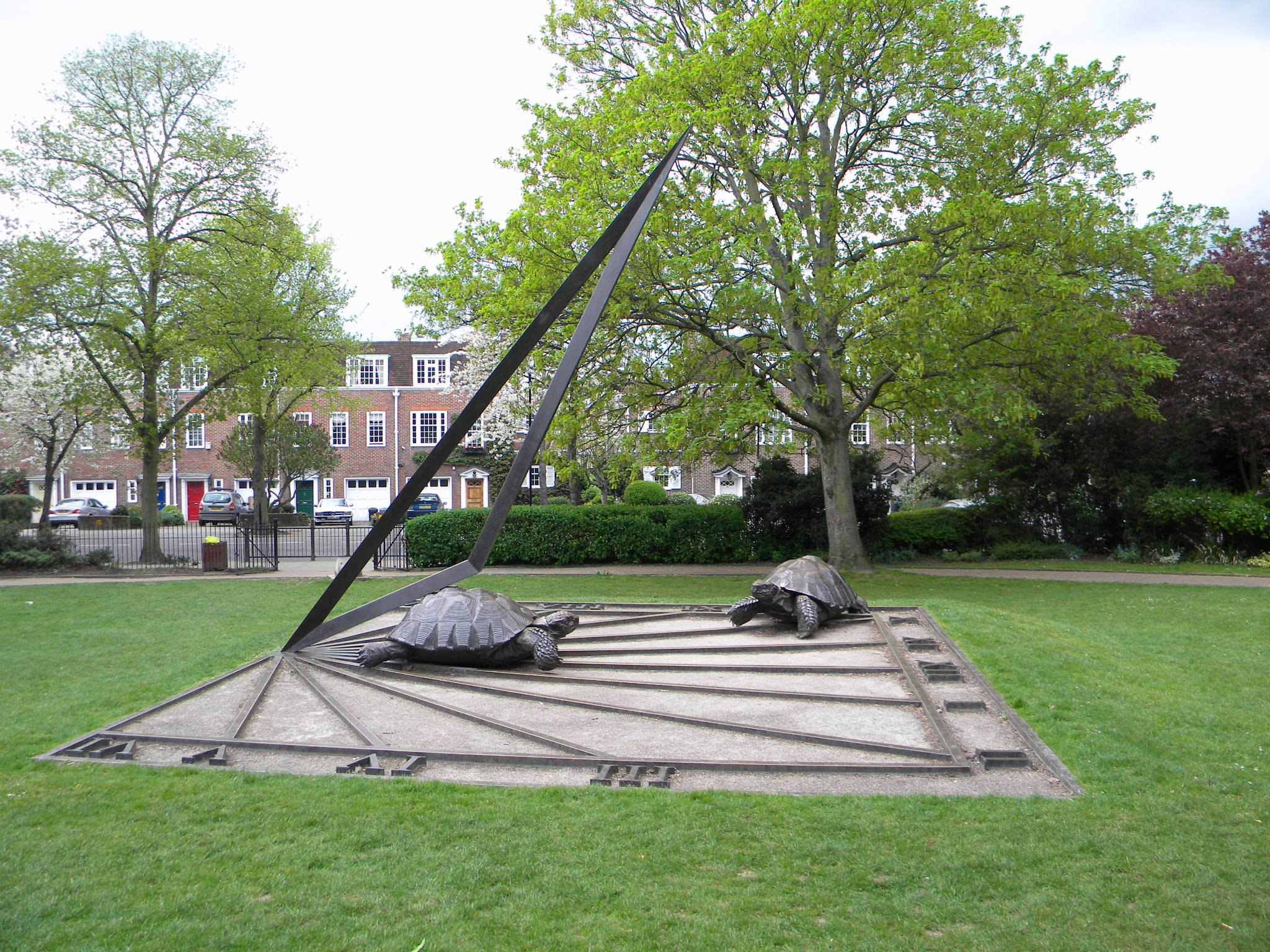
Tortoises with Triangle and Time with Abbotsbury Road in the background

At the northern end in the park, installed in 2000, is the outdoor sculpture Tortoises with Triangle and Time by Wendy Taylor, commissioned by the Royal Borough of Kensington and Chelsea for the Millennium.

== See also ==
- Campden Hill
- Holland Park
