= Glyn Philpot =

British artist (1884–1937)

Glyn Philpot RA
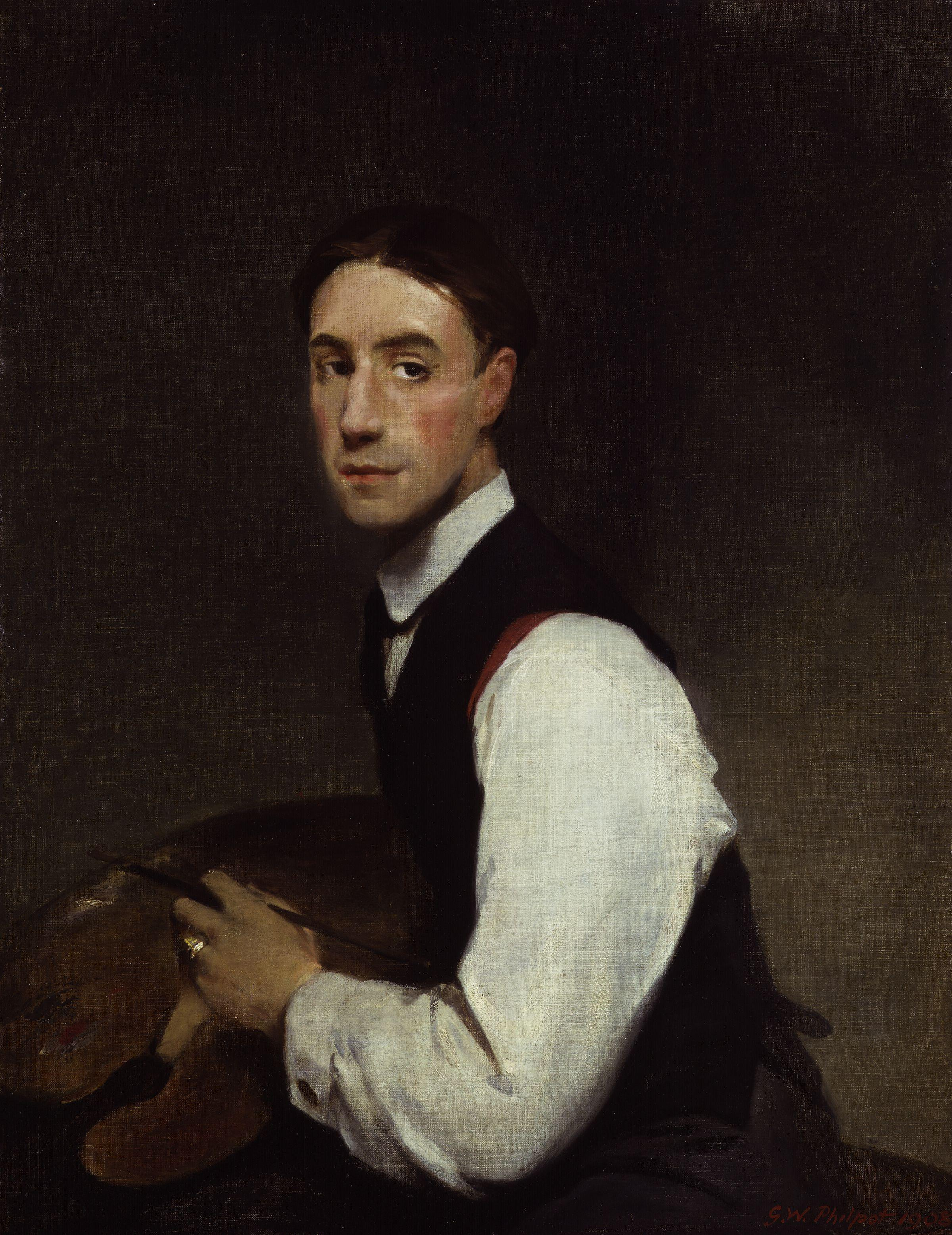
- Self-portrait, 1908
- Born: Glyn Warren Philpot; 5 October 1884; Clapham, London, England
- Died: 16 December 1937 (aged 53); London, England
- Resting place: St Peter's Church
- Education: Lambeth School of Art; Académie Julian
- Style: Painting; sculpting
- Partner: Vivian Forbes (1923–1935)

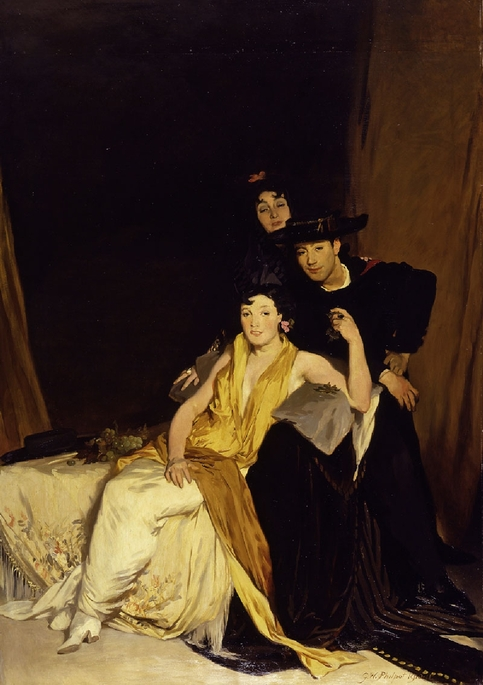
The Dog-Rose (La zarzarosa), 1910

Glyn Warren Philpot RA (5 October 1884 – 16 December 1937) was a British painter and sculptor, best known for his portraits of contemporary figures such as Siegfried Sassoon and Vladimir Rosing.

== Early life ==
Philpot was born on 5 October 1884 in Clapham, London, but the family moved to Herne in Kent shortly afterwards. Philpot grew up to be both a gay man, and a practising Christian who converted to Roman Catholicism.

Philpot studied at the Lambeth School of Art (now known as City and Guilds of London Art School) in 1900, where he was taught by Philip Connard, and at the Académie Julian in Paris.

== Career ==
Philpot first exhibited at the Royal Academy in 1904 and was elected to that establishment in 1923. He was a member of the International Society from 1913 and in that year he was awarded the gold medal at the Carnegie Institute, Pittsburgh.

He enjoyed a "comfortable income" from portraiture. He was reported as doing ten or twelve commissions a year, charging between £600 and £3,000 a time. This enabled him to afford to travel to France, Italy, America and North Africa and continue to paint less commercially successful subject pictures. Following the Symbolist tradition his subject pictures reflected more personal concerns and contradictions: Philpot converted to Catholicism, yet his interest in the male nude and portraits of young men – thought to be friends, models and lovers – show his gradual acceptance and expression of his own homosexuality. Some of these later works were considered controversial because of their homosexual imagery. Two pieces in particular – Guardian of the Flame and The Great Pan (1930) were withdrawn from the Royal Academy. This led to a loss of popularity which caused him financial hardship.

Exhibitions have been held at The Tate Gallery (1938), The Ashmolean Museum, The National Portrait Gallery, of which he was a founder member in 1911, and Pallant House Gallery (2022). The 2022 Pallant House Gallery exhibition included a portrait of Paul Robeson as Othello, hitherto thought lost. Philpot was a member of the International Society of Sculptors, Painters and Gravers.

== Personal life ==
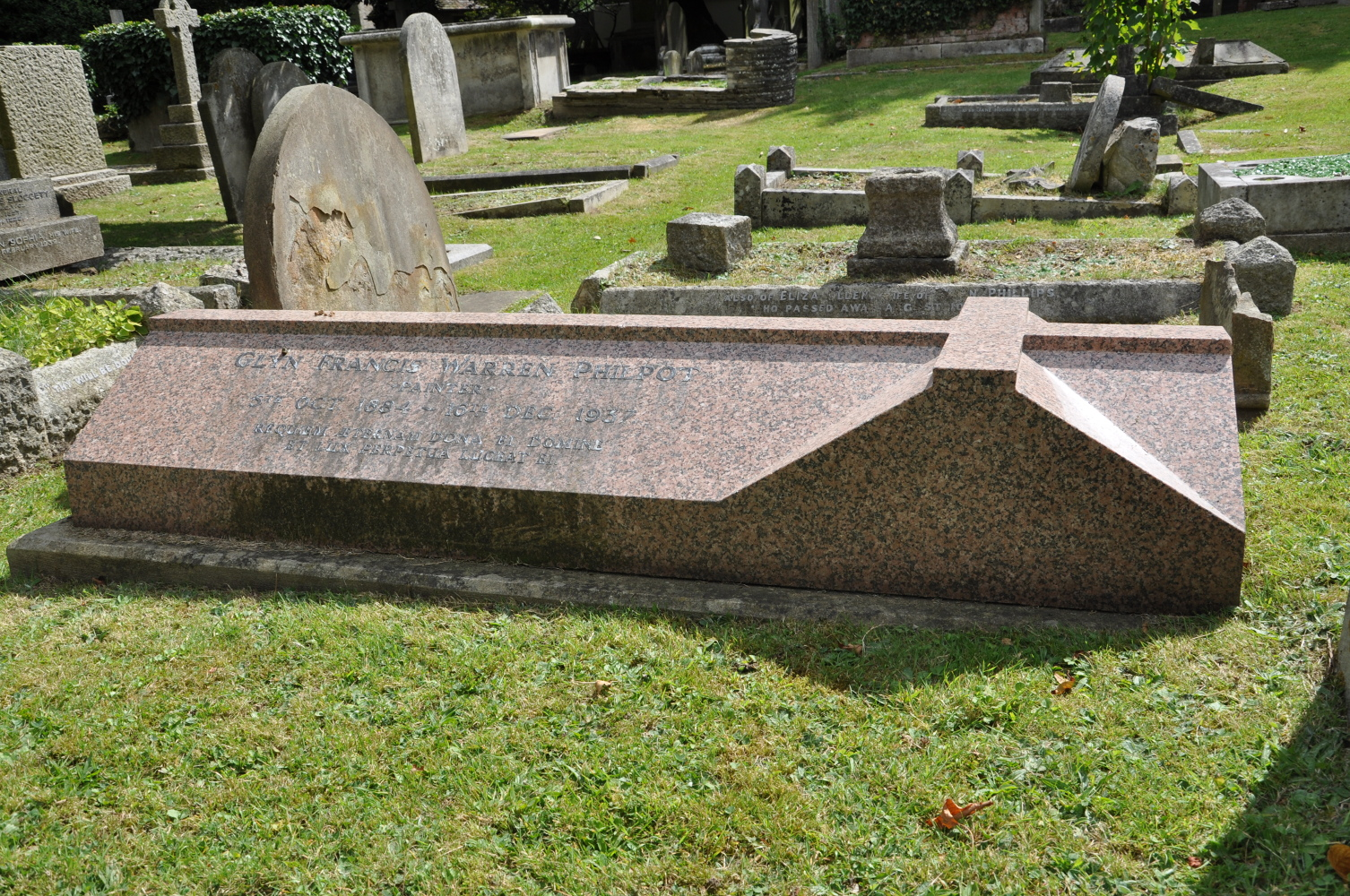
Glyn Philpot's grave

Philpot was in a relationship with painter Vivian Forbes from 1923 to 1935. A loving cup held by Brighton Museum serves as a testament to their relationship.

Philpot died from a stroke on 16 December 1937 in London; his funeral took place on 22 December 1937. Forbes committed suicide the following day. He is buried in a pink granite tomb in St Peter's Churchyard, Petersham, in west London.

== Sources ==
- Delaney, J. G. P. (1999) Glyn Philpot: His Life and Art, Ashgate Publishing
- Gibson, Robin (1986) Glyn Philpot, 1884–1937: Edwardian Aesthete to Thirties Modernist, National Portrait Gallery, London
