= Vivian Forbes =

English painter (1891–1937)

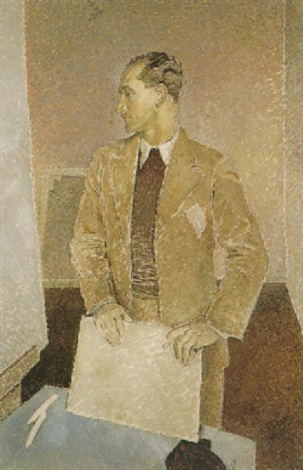
Portrait of Vivian Forbes by Glyn Philpot

Vivian Forbes (8 August 1891 – 24 December 1937) was an English soldier, painter and poet in the early 20th century, and the longtime partner of painter Glyn Philpot.

== Life ==
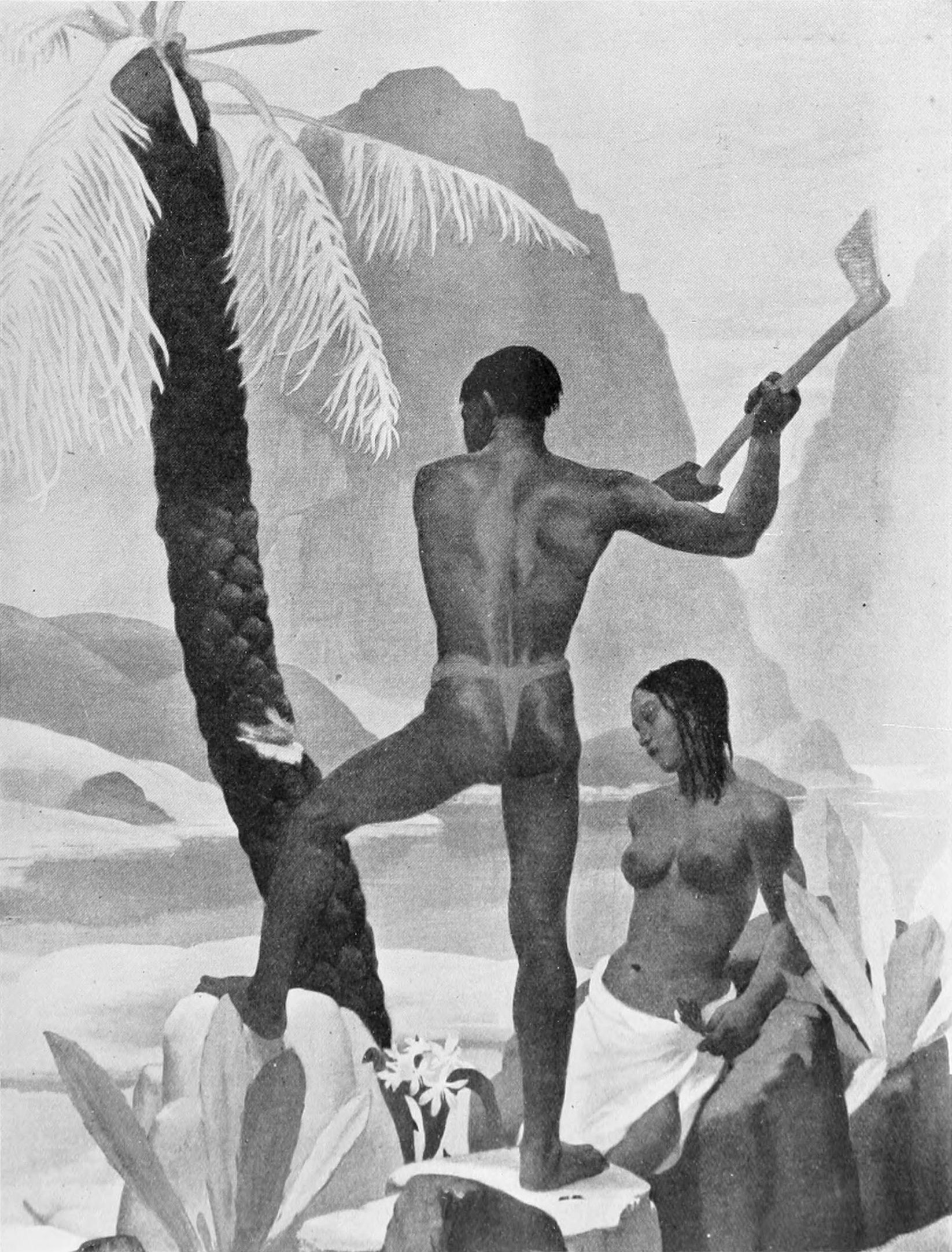
Vivian Forbes - The Echoing Valley

Forbes was enlisted in the Royal Fusiliers; he met Philpot while training at Aldershot in 1915. He was involved in business in Egypt after the war, before beginning a more serious relationship with Philpot. Like Philpot's, his work was affected by his concerns over the rise of fascism in Europe. He was influenced by the 19th century Aestheticism movement, and painters like Charles Ricketts and Charles Haslewood Shannon. Forbes also composed poetry, all of it dedicated to Philpot and their relationship. Forbes, Philpot, Ricketts and Shannon all had studios at some point in the Lansdown Road building of the Ladbroke Estate.

Described as witty and charming, Forbes was also unstable, and his relationship with Philpot was very close. Following Philpot's sudden death on 18 December 1937, Forbes was overcome with grief; he died by suicide using sleeping pills on 23 December, the day after Philpot's funeral.
