= Wendy Taylor =

British sculptor

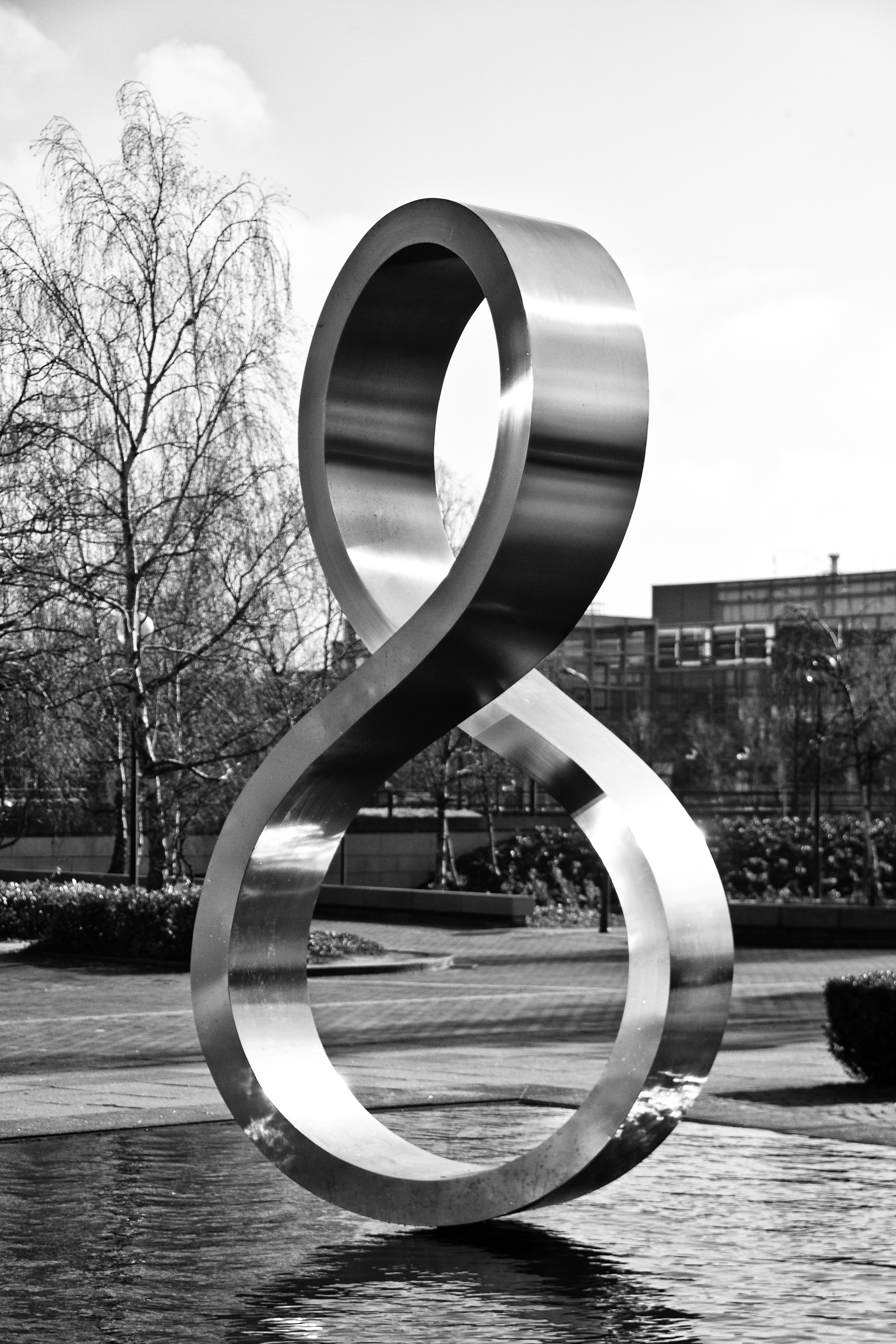
- Octo, Milton Keynes
- Education: St Martin's School of Art
- Known for: Sculpture
- Movement: Modernism
- Website: http://wendytaylorsculpture.co.uk/

Wendy Ann Taylor CBE (born Stamford, Lincolnshire, 1945) is an English artist and sculptor, specialising in permanent, site-specific commissions. According to her website, she 'was one of the first artists of her generation to “take art out of the galleries and onto the streets”'. Her work typically consists of large sculptures which are displayed to appear carefully balanced.

== Early life and education ==
Wendy Taylor studied from 1963 to 1967 at the Saint Martin's School of Art in London. She gained renown for her many sculptures in the public realm, especially in London.

== Career ==
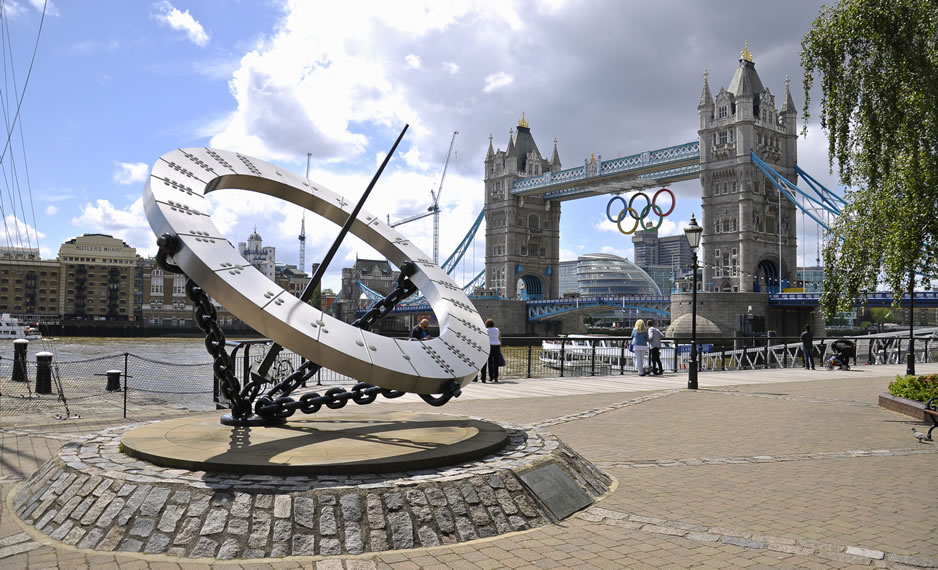
Timepiece, St Katharine Docks by Tower Bridge

Taylor's abstract sculptures explore themes of equilibrium, materiality and fabrication. She views her artworks as communicative devices.

From 1981 to 1999, Taylor was a Member of the Royal Fine Art Commission which now forms part of the Design Council. From 1986 to 1988, she was design consultant for the Commission for New Towns. In 1988, Taylor was the subject of a documentary on The South Bank Show, and, in 1992, her work was profiled in a monograph by Edward Lucie-Smith.

In the 1988 Birthday Honours, Taylor was appointed a Commander of the Order of the British Empire. In 1999, she restored the Virginia Quay Settlers Monument at Blackwall, London, adding a mariner's astrolabe. In 2005, a major exhibition of her work was held at the Cass Sculpture Foundation in Goodwood titled The Seed Series. In 2009, this exhibition travelled to Canary Wharf in London.

Three of her works are Grade II listed structures: the Virginia Quay Settlers Monument, Timepiece in St Katharine Docks, London, and the Octo sculpture and reflecting pool, in Milton Keynes. The Octo is a "continuous strip of stainless steel, 12ft high, forms a sinuous foil to the Miesian purism of Stuart Mosscrop's town office buildings". It is an early example of the Milton Keynes Development Corporation’s public art programme.

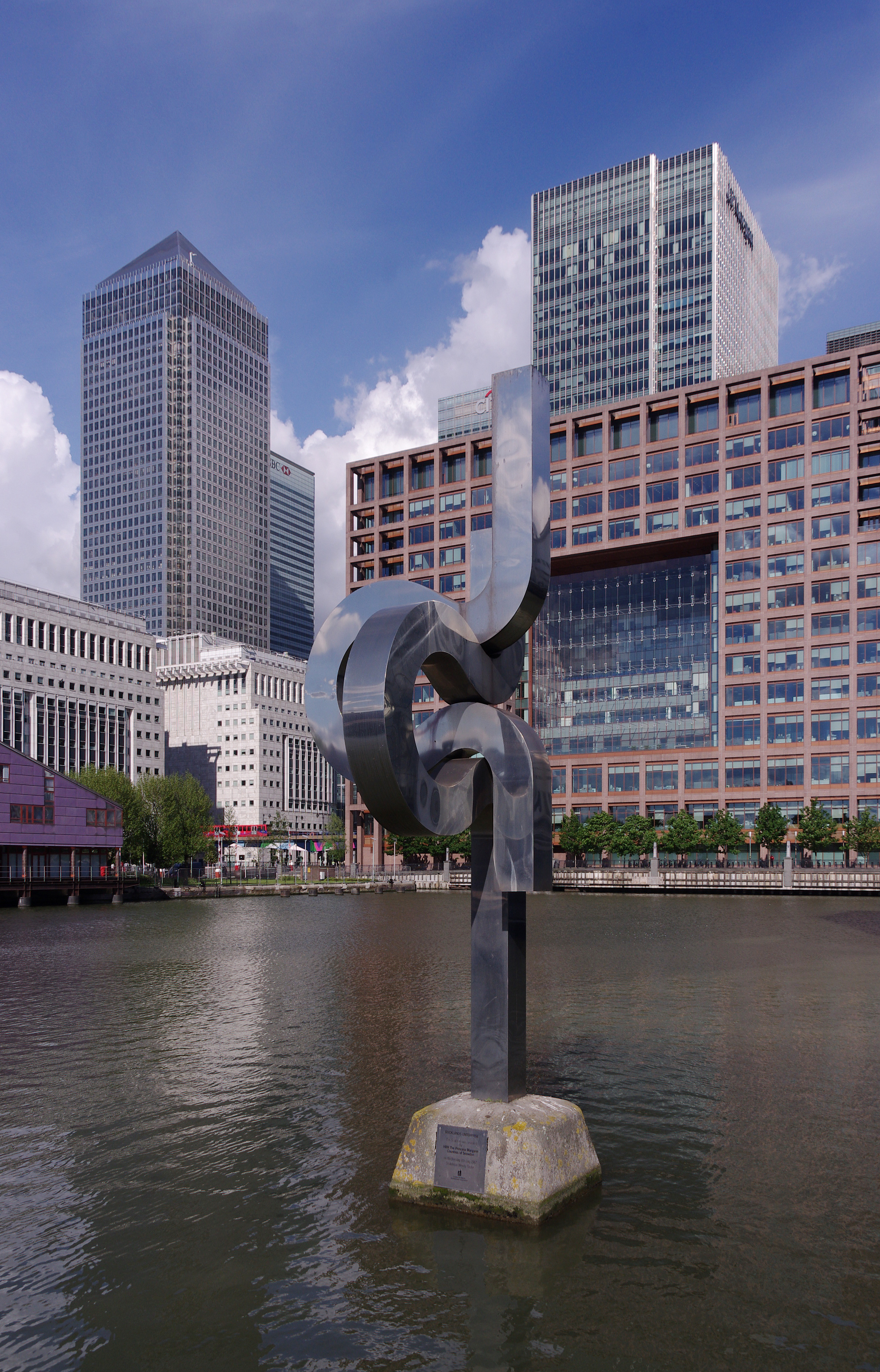
Wendy Taylor: Spirit of Enterprise (1995). Canary Wharf, London

Taylor lives and works in London. She is a fellow of the Royal Zoological Society.

== The Time Party dispute ==
In 2019 Taylor was in dispute with The Time Party after the minor pro-Brexit party used an image of Timepiece on their website and on their merchandise. Talking to The Observer, Taylor said "It is not so much about the politics for me, it is about using Timepiece in a way I did not intend. The Time party may say that the image is just a sundial, but it is clearly based on my work.”

== Exhibitions ==
- Kasmin Gallery, 1966.
- Exhibited Tier and Column at the British Council exhibition 'British Printmakers 1968–1970'.
- Sculpture 66, AIA Gallery, London 1966.
- Axiom Gallery, London, 1970.
- Angela Flowers Gallery, London, 1972.
- 24th King's Lynn Festival, Norfolk, 1974.
- World Trade Centre, London, 1974.
- Annely Juda Fine Art, London, 1975.
- Oxford Gallery, Oxford, 1976.
- Oliver Downing Gallery, Dublin, 1976.
- Oliver Downing Gallery, Dublin, 1979.
- 'Building Art- The Process', The Building Centre Gallery, London, 1986.
- Austin, Desmond & Phipps, London, 1992.
- 'Art and Engineering', The Osbourne Group, London, 1998.
- 'The Seed Series', Cass Sculpture Foundation Gallery, London, 2005.
- 'The Seed Series', Canary Wharf, London, 2009.

== Works ==
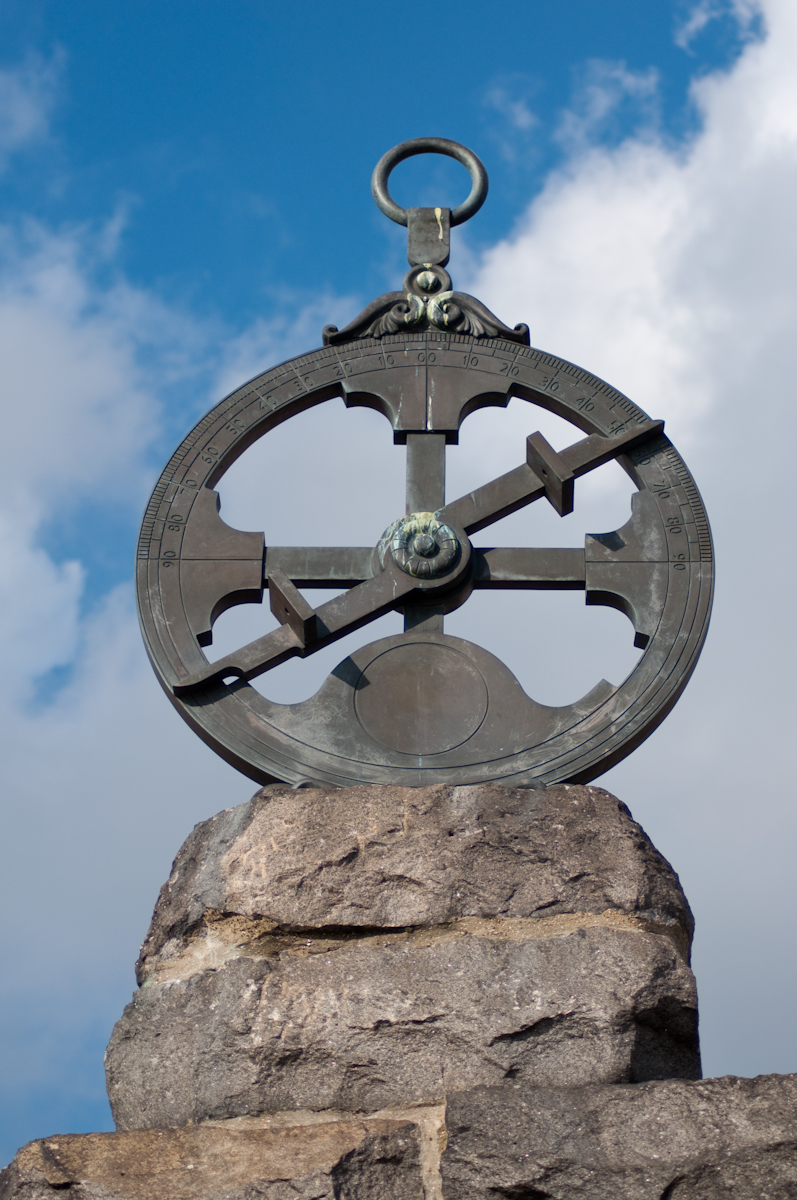
Astrolabe on the Virginia Quay Settlers Monument

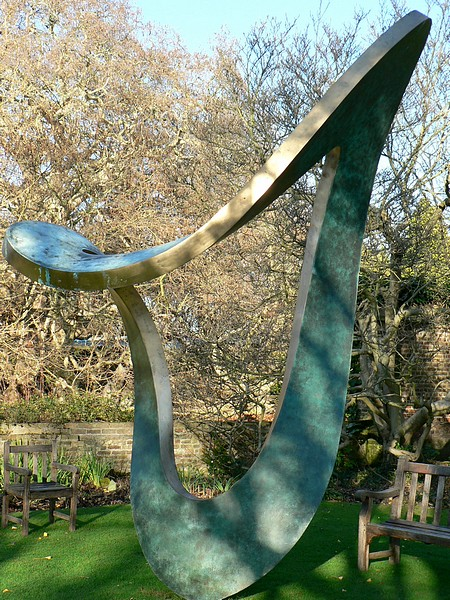
Jester, Cambridge

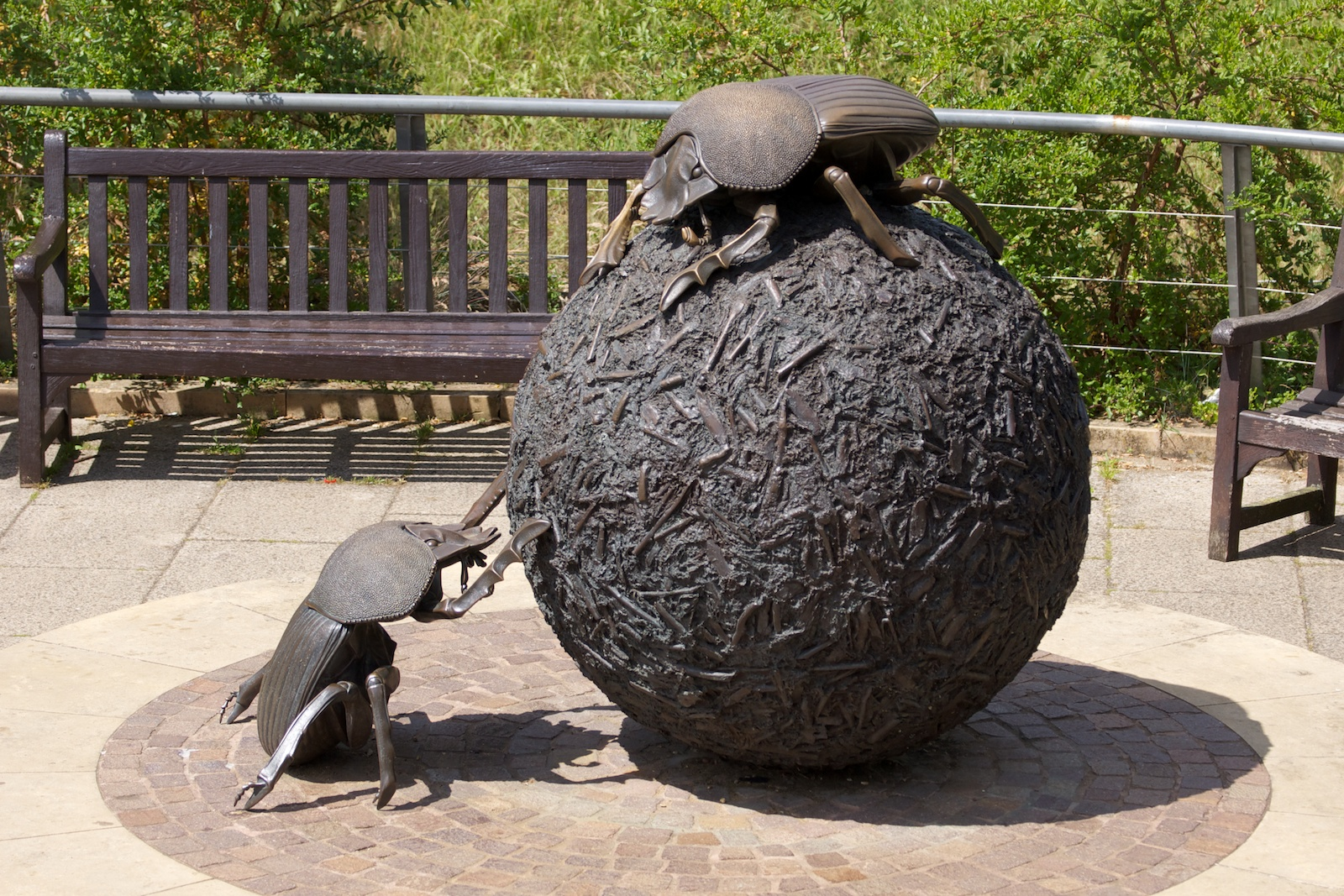
Dung Beetles sculpture at London Zoo

- 1971: Triad, Somerville College, Oxford
- 1973: Timepiece, St Katharine Docks, London
- 1979/80: Octo, Norfolk House, Milton Keynes
- 1982: Essence, Saxon Court, Milton Keynes
- 1983: Gazebo, Golders Hill Park, London Barnet
- 1986: Pharos, East Kilbride South Lanarkshire
- 1987: Docklands Enterprise, West Dock/Marsh Lane
- 1987: Globe Sundial Sculpture, Marine Walk, Swansea
- 1994: Jester, Emmanuel College, Cambridge, and the Donald M. Kendall Sculpture Gardens, Purchase, USA
- 1997: Rope Circle, Hermitage Basin, London
- 1997: Spirit of Barrow
- 1999: Dung Beetles, Millennium Conservation Centre, Regent's Park, London
- 1999: Virginia Quay Settlers Monument, Jamestown Way, London (restoration of the 1928 monument)
- 2000: Tortoises with Triangle and Time, Holland Park, London
- 2000: The Millennium Fountain, River Walk, Enfield
- 2001: Voyager, Wapping High Street
- 2003: Knowledge, Library Square, Queen Mary and Westfield College, London
- 2006: Sycamore, sculpture garden at Cass Sculpture Foundation, Goodwood

== Awards ==
Awards received by Taylor
1964	Walter Neurath Award
1965	Pratt Award
1966	Sainsbury Award
1977	‘Duias na Riochta’ (Kingdom Prize) Gold Medal at the Listowel Graphics Exhibition, County Kerry, Eire
1977	Arts Council Award
1978	First Prize Silk-screen, Barcham Green Print Competition
1988	Commander of the British Empire
1989	Fellow of the Zoological Society
1993	Fellow of Queen Mary College, University of London
1994	Fellow of the Royal Society of British Sculptors
2002	Civic Trust Partnership Award, Chase Green, Enfield
2004	Building of the Year Award, Architectural Sculpture
2004	Fellow of the Royal Society of Arts
