= Grade II* listed buildings in the Royal Borough of Kensington and Chelsea =

There are over 20,000 Grade II* listed buildings in England. This page is a list of these buildings in the Royal Borough of Kensington and Chelsea.

== Buildings ==
Name	Location	Type	Completed (Note: The date given is the date used by Historic England as significant for the initial building or that of an important part in the structure's description.)	Date designated	Grid ref. (Note: The grid reference is based on the British national grid reference system, sometimes known as OSGB36, used by the Ordnance Survey.) Geo-coordinates	Entry number (Note: The "List Entry Number" is a unique number assigned to each listed building and scheduled monument by Historic England.)	Image
All Saints Church, Talbot Road and Clydesdale Road	Kensington and Chelsea	Church	1852–61	29 July 1949	TQ2479481263; 51°30′59″N 0°12′10″W	1080701	All Saints Church, Talbot Road and Clydesdale Road More images
Arcade Forming North East Quarter of Circle and Avenue	Brompton Cemetery, Kensington and Chelsea	Gate	1839–40	15 April 1969	TQ2578177710; 51°29′04″N 0°11′24″W	1266242	Arcade Forming North East Quarter of Circle and Avenue More images
Arcade Forming North West Quarter of Circle and Avenue	Brompton Cemetery, Kensington and Chelsea	Gate	1839–40	15 April 1969	TQ2575577693; 51°29′03″N 0°11′25″W	1225713	Arcade Forming North West Quarter of Circle and Avenue
Arcade Forming South East Quarter of Circle and Avenue	Brompton Cemetery, Kensington and Chelsea	Gate	1839–40	15 April 1969	TQ2583277640; 51°29′01″N 0°11′21″W	1225714	Arcade Forming South East Quarter of Circle and Avenue
Arcade Forming South Western Quarter of Circle and Avenue	Kensington and Chelsea	Gate	1839–40	15 April 1969	TQ2579477619; 51°29′01″N 0°11′23″W	1266205	Arcade Forming South Western Quarter of Circle and Avenue More images
Argyle House and Gates and Railings, 211 King's Road	Kensington and Chelsea	House	1723	24 June 1954	TQ2714178002; 51°29′12″N 0°10′13″W	1224631	Argyle House and Gates and Railings, 211 King's Road More images
Aubrey House, Aubrey Road	Kensington and Chelsea	House	Circa 1730–1740	29 July 1949	TQ2484380078; 51°30′21″N 0°12′09″W	1188804	Aubrey House, Aubrey Road More images
Building to Centre of South West Side of College Court, Royal Hospital Chelsea	Kensington and Chelsea	Railings	Early 19th century	15 April 1969	TQ2791177967; 51°29′10″N 0°09′33″W	1226383	Building to Centre of South West Side of College Court, Royal Hospital Chelsea
Building to South of Range West of Chelsea Gate Roadway Royal Hospital	Kensington and Chelsea	Orangery	Late 17th century and later	15 April 1969	TQ2794977934; 51°29′09″N 0°09′31″W	1226450	Upload Photo
Carlyle's House, 24 Cheyne Row	Kensington and Chelsea	House	1708	24 June 1954	TQ2717877718; 51°29′03″N 0°10′11″W	1358142	Carlyle's House, 24 Cheyne Row More images
St Luke's Chapel, Royal Brompton Hospital, Fulham Road	Sydney Street, London SW3	Chapel	1849–50	3 October 1988	TQ2681578490; 51°29′28″N 0°10′29″W	1272410	St Luke's Chapel, Royal Brompton Hospital, Fulham Road More images
Chapel to Duke of York's Headquarters	King's Road, Chelsea SW3	Chapel	Consecrated 1824	7 November 1984	TQ2778578483; 51°29′27″N 0°09′39″W	1224627	Chapel to Duke of York's Headquarters More images
Chelsea Public Library, now part of Chelsea College of Science and Technology	Manresa Road, Chelsea	Public Library	1890	15 April 1969	TQ2704378042; 51°29′13″N 0°10′18″W	1266312	Chelsea Public Library, now part of Chelsea College of Science and Technology More images
Church of England Chapel	Brompton Cemetery, Kensington and Chelsea	Cemetery Chapel	1839–40	15 April 1969	TQ2584777592; 51°29′00″N 0°11′20″W	1266241	Church of England Chapel More images
St Augustine's, Queen's Gate	Kensington and Chelsea	Church	1865	29 July 1949	TQ2658578731; 51°29′36″N 0°10′41″W	1226161	St Augustine's, Queen's Gate More images
St Cuthbert's, Earls Court	52/3 Philbeach Gardens, Earls Court SW5	Church	1884-7	15 April 1969	TQ2502578455; 51°29′28″N 0°12′02″W	1266119	St Cuthbert's, Earls Court More images
Church of St Francis Assisi, Pottery Lane W11	Kensington and Chelsea	Church	1860	15 April 1969	TQ2426280502; 51°30′35″N 0°12′39″W	1226049	Church of St Francis Assisi, Pottery Lane W11 More images
St Jude's Church, Kensington, Collingham Road SW5	Kensington and Chelsea	Church	1870	7 November 1984	TQ2591978720; 51°29′36″N 0°11′15″W	1080661	St Jude's Church, Kensington, Collingham Road SW5 More images
St Mary's, Cadogan Street	Cadogan Street, Chelsea SW3	Roman Catholic Church	Circa 1877–79	15 April 1969	TQ2773078744; 51°29′36″N 0°09′41″W	1294258	St Mary's, Cadogan Street More images
St Peter's, Notting Hill, Kensington Park Road W11	Kensington and Chelsea	Church	1855-7	29 July 1949	TQ2481580840; 51°30′46″N 0°12′10″W	1224309	St Peter's, Notting Hill, Kensington Park Road W11 More images
Church of St Yeghiche, South Kensington (Armenian Church)	Cranley Gardens, London SW7	Church	1907–09	7 November 1984	TQ2659778296; 51°29′22″N 0°10′41″W	1190125	Church of St Yeghiche, South Kensington (Armenian Church) More images
St Sarkis, Kensington (Armenian Church)	Iverna Gardens, London W8	Church	1922–23	16 January 1981	TQ2548279397; 51°29′59″N 0°11′37″W	1080556	St Sarkis, Kensington (Armenian Church) More images
St Stephen's, Gloucester Road	Gloucester Road, London SW7 4RL	Church	1866-7	7 November 1984	TQ2619078979; 51°29′44″N 0°11′01″W	1293603	St Stephen's, Gloucester Road More images
Cole Wing, Victoria and Albert Museum, Exhibition Road	Kensington and Chelsea	Museum	1868–73	15 April 1969	TQ2688579176; 51°29′50″N 0°10′25″W	1080654	Cole Wing, Victoria and Albert Museum, Exhibition Road More images
Commonwealth Institute, Kensington High Street	Kensington and Chelsea	Conference centre	1960-2	12 October 1988	TQ2499279424; 51°30′00″N 0°12′02″W	1227441	Commonwealth Institute, Kensington High Street More images
Crosby Hall, Cheyne Walk and Danvers Street SW3	Kensington and Chelsea	Merchants House	1466	24 June 1954	TQ2699177560; 51°28′58″N 0°10′21″W	1358160	Crosby Hall, Cheyne Walk and Danvers Street SW3 More images
Duke of York's Headquarters (Territorial Army), King's Road	Kensington and Chelsea	Psychiatric Hospital	1801	15 April 1969	TQ2792678462; 51°29′26″N 0°09′32″W	1266717	Duke of York's Headquarters (Territorial Army), King's Road More images
Entrance Gates and Screen on Old Brompton Road	Brompton Cemetery, Kensington and Chelsea	Gate	1839–40	15 April 1969	TQ2549078097; 51°29′16″N 0°11′38″W	1225715	Entrance Gates and Screen on Old Brompton Road More images
Entrance Gateway opposite Wellington Road, Harrow Road	Kensal Green Cemetery, Kensington and Chelsea	Gate	1833	15 April 1969	TQ2375882538; 51°31′42″N 0°13′02″W	1358176	Entrance Gateway opposite Wellington Road, Harrow Road More images
4 Cheyne Walk	Chelsea SW3	House	1718	24 June 1954	TQ2755177744; 51°29′03″N 0°09′52″W	1080721	4 Cheyne Walk More images
Forecourt Railings and Gate to Number 4 Cheyne Walk	Kensington and Chelsea	Gate	18th century	15 April 1969	TQ2755677729; 51°29′03″N 0°09′52″W	1294130	Forecourt Railings and Gate to Number 4 Cheyne Walk
5 Cheyne Walk	Chelsea SW3	House	1718	24 June 1954	TQ2754277743; 51°29′03″N 0°09′52″W	1294123	5 Cheyne Walk More images
Forecourt Railings Piers to Gate to Number 5 Cheyne Walk	Kensington and Chelsea	Gate	18th century	15 April 1969	TQ2754877726; 51°29′03″N 0°09′52″W	1358144	Forecourt Railings Piers to Gate to Number 5 Cheyne Walk
15 Cheyne Walk	Chelsea SW3	House	c. 1718	24 June 1954	TQ2745777716; 51°29′03″N 0°09′57″W	1358125	15 Cheyne Walk More images
Queens House	16 Cheyne Walk, Chelsea SW3	House	1717	24 June 1954	TQ2744577713; 51°29′02″N 0°09′57″W	1080685	Queens House More images
Forecourt Railings, Piers and Gate to Number 15 and 16, Cheyne Walk	Kensington and Chelsea	Gate	18th century	15 April 1969	TQ2746177696; 51°29′02″N 0°09′57″W	1080687	Forecourt Railings, Piers and Gate to Number 15 and 16, Cheyne Walk More images
6 Cheyne Walk	Chelsea SW3	House	1718	24 June 1954	TQ2752577740; 51°29′03″N 0°09′53″W	1358143	6 Cheyne Walk More images
Forecourt Walls Railings Gates and Piers to Number 6 Cheyne Walk	Kensington and Chelsea	Gate	Mid-late 18th century	15 April 1969	TQ2753777722; 51°29′03″N 0°09′53″W	1080681	Forecourt Walls Railings Gates and Piers to Number 6 Cheyne Walk
Garden Corner	13 Chelsea Embankment	House	1879	15 April 1969	TQ2766777726; 51°29′03″N 0°09′46″W	1080708	Garden Corner More images
Harrods	Kensington and Chelsea	Department Store	1901-5	15 April 1969	TQ2761779413; 51°29′57″N 0°09′46″W	1294346	Harrods More images
Monument to HRH Augustus Frederick	Kensal Green Cemetery, Kensington and Chelsea	Commemorative Monument	1843	13 June 2001	TQ2322682571; 51°31′43″N 0°13′30″W	1389385	Monument to HRH Augustus Frederick
Kensal House	1–68, Ladbroke Grove, North Kensington W10	Flats	1936-8	19 March 1981	TQ2391382184; 51°31′30″N 0°12′55″W	1225244	Kensal House More images
Kensal House Day Nursery	Ladbroke Grove, North Kensington W10	Nursery	1936-8	19 March 1981	TQ2388082234; 51°31′32″N 0°12′57″W	1266444	Kensal House Day Nursery
Kensington Central Library including adjoining Pylons	Hornton Street, Kensington W8	Library	1958–1960	24 April 1998	TQ2542279598; 51°30′05″N 0°11′40″W	1119724	Kensington Central Library including adjoining Pylons More images
Leighton House	12 Holland Park Road, West Kensington W14	Studio House	1866–96	30 August 1961	TQ2482279271; 51°29′55″N 0°12′11″W	1191541	Leighton House More images
Lindsey House	96–101 Cheyne Walk, Chelsea SW3	House	1674	24 June 1954	TQ2684777495; 51°28′56″N 0°10′29″W	1189891	Lindsey House More images
Linley Sambourne House	18 Stafford Terrace, Kensington W8 7BH	Town House	1868	26 September 2012	TQ2525479490; 51°30′02″N 0°11′49″W	1409861	Linley Sambourne House More images
Lodge Immediately South of Stable Yard, Royal Hospital Chelsea	Kensington and Chelsea	Lodge	Late 17th century	15 April 1969	TQ2787377998; 51°29′11″N 0°09′35″W	1226381	Lodge Immediately South of Stable Yard, Royal Hospital Chelsea
Marks and Spencers, British Home Stores and the Roof Garden	99–121 Kensington High St W8	Department Store	1933	16 January 1981	TQ2562279527; 51°30′03″N 0°11′30″W	1222781	Marks and Spencers, British Home Stores and the Roof Garden More images
Monument to Hrh Princess Sophia, Kensal Green Cemetery	Kensington and Chelsea	Tomb Chest	Erected 1848	7 November 1984	TQ2322482549; 51°31′42″N 0°13′30″W	1080633	Monument to Hrh Princess Sophia, Kensal Green Cemetery More images
Monument to Ninon Michaelis, Kensal Green Cemetery	Kensington and Chelsea	Tomb	Erected 1895	13 June 2001	TQ2355382556; 51°31′42″N 0°13′13″W	1246089	Monument to Ninon Michaelis, Kensal Green Cemetery More images
1a Palace Gate, including Area Railings	Kensington W8	Town House	1896–98	15 April 1969	TQ2612179603; 51°30′05″N 0°11′04″W	1066003	1a Palace Gate, including Area Railings More images
Old Vestry Hall (part of Chelsea Town Hall)	CHELSEA MANOR GARDENS, Chelsea SW3	Town Hall	1886	15 April 1969	TQ2727778047; 51°29′13″N 0°10′06″W	1294164	Old Vestry Hall (part of Chelsea Town Hall) More images
Parish Church of St Mary Abbot and Railings to Churchyard	Kensington and Chelsea	Church	1869–1872	29 July 1949	TQ2560579707; 51°30′08″N 0°11′30″W	1239529	Parish Church of St Mary Abbot and Railings to Churchyard More images
Peter Jones Store	Kensington and Chelsea	Department Store	1936	7 November 1984	TQ2791078651; 51°29′32″N 0°09′32″W	1226626	Peter Jones Store More images
Principal's House College of St Mark and St John	King's Road, Kensington and Chelsea	House	c. 1691	24 June 1954	TQ2608477328; 51°28′51″N 0°11′09″W	1266547	Principal's House College of St Mark and St John More images
Stable Yard, to West of Chelsea Gate Roadway, Royal Hospital	Kensington and Chelsea	Yard	1814–17	15 April 1969	TQ2783678021; 51°29′12″N 0°09′37″W	1226380	Stable Yard, to West of Chelsea Gate Roadway, Royal Hospital
Swan House, 17 Chelsea Embankment	Kensington and Chelsea	House	1876	24 June 1954	TQ2762177720; 51°29′03″N 0°09′48″W	1294208	Swan House, 17 Chelsea Embankment More images
The Dissenters Chapel	Kensal Green Cemetery, Kensington and Chelsea	Nonconformist Chapel	1831–34	15 April 1969	TQ2386382399; 51°31′37″N 0°12′57″W	1080628	The Dissenters Chapel More images
Electric Cinema	191 Portobello Road, Notting Hill W11	Cinema	1910–12	8 February 1974	TQ2464481150; 51°30′56″N 0°12′18″W	1266083	Electric Cinema More images
Brompton Oratory	Brompton Road, Chelsea	Church	1884	15 April 1969	TQ2715679165; 51°29′50″N 0°10′11″W	1358123	Brompton Oratory More images
The Oratory House (Block parallel to Brompton Road, Brompton Oratory)	Kensington and Chelsea	House	1853	7 November 1984	TQ2711579156; 51°29′49″N 0°10′13″W	1080763	The Oratory House (Block parallel to Brompton Road, Brompton Oratory) More images
The Royal Hospital North East Range	Kensington and Chelsea	Hospital	Late C17/early 18th century	15 April 1969	TQ2810178181; 51°29′17″N 0°09′23″W	1226303	The Royal Hospital North East Range
Tomb of Andrew Ducrow	Kensal Green Cemetery, Kensington and Chelsea	Mausoleum	1837	7 November 1984	TQ2335882552; 51°31′42″N 0°13′23″W	1358179	Tomb of Andrew Ducrow More images
Tomb of Commander Charles Spencer Ricketts, Royal Navy	Kensal Green Cemetery, Kensington and Chelsea	Chest Tomb	1867	7 November 1984	TQ2347282535; 51°31′42″N 0°13′17″W	1080630	Tomb of Commander Charles Spencer Ricketts, Royal Navy More images
Tomb of Elizabeth and Alexis Soyer	Kensal Green Cemetery, Kensington and Chelsea	Statue	1850s	7 November 1984	TQ2334882670; 51°31′46″N 0°13′24″W	1191060	Tomb of Elizabeth and Alexis Soyer More images
Tomb of Frederick Richards Leyland, Brompton Cemetery	Kensington and Chelsea	Chest Tomb	c. 1892	7 November 1984	TQ2565377846; 51°29′08″N 0°11′30″W	1225750	Tomb of Frederick Richards Leyland, Brompton Cemetery More images
Tomb of John St John Long	Kensal Green Cemetery, Kensington and Chelsea	Tomb	1834	7 November 1984	TQ2335782560; 51°31′43″N 0°13′23″W	1191149	Tomb of John St John Long
Tomb of Major General Sir William Casement, Knight Commander of the Bath	Kensal Green Cemetery, Kensington and Chelsea	Mausoleum	1844	7 November 1984	TQ2341482551; 51°31′42″N 0°13′20″W	1293515	Tomb of Major General Sir William Casement, Knight Commander of the Bath More images
Tomb of Mary Gibson	Kensal Green Cemetery, Kensington and Chelsea	Chest Tomb	1872	7 November 1984	TQ2339882561; 51°31′43″N 0°13′21″W	1293490	Tomb of Mary Gibson More images
Tomb of William Mulready, Royal Academy	Kensal Green Cemetery, Kensington and Chelsea	Tomb	1863	7 November 1984	TQ2339382561; 51°31′43″N 0°13′21″W	1358178	Tomb of William Mulready, Royal Academy More images
Trellick Tower, Cheltenham Estate	Golborne Road, Kensington and Chelsea	Flats	1968–1972	22 December 1998	TQ2460082053; 51°31′25″N 0°12′19″W	1246688	Trellick Tower, Cheltenham Estate More images
West House	Bramerton Street, London SW3 5JP	House	1876	24 June 1954	TQ2708877834; 51°29′07″N 0°10′16″W	1080657	West House More images
Wilbraham House and Wall to Right	D'OYLEY STREET SW1	House	1922	7 November 1984	TQ2808178841; 51°29′38″N 0°09′23″W	1358161	Wilbraham House and Wall to Right More images
Woodland House	31 Melbury Road, Holland Park, W14	Detached House	1875	29 July 1949	TQ2484979415; 51°30′00″N 0°12′10″W	1225541	Woodland House More images
1 Palace Green	Kensington W8	Detached House	1868	15 April 1969	TQ2575179762; 51°30′10″N 0°11′23″W	1065945	1 Palace Green More images
2 Palace Green	Kensington W8	Detached House	1860-2	15 April 1969	TQ2574179806; 51°30′12″N 0°11′23″W	1357462	2 Palace Green More images
2–14 Pelham Place	Kensington and Chelsea	Terrace	c. 1825	29 July 1949	TQ2706478743; 51°29′36″N 0°10′16″W	1065845	2–14 Pelham Place More images
1–14 Pelham Crescent	Kensington and Chelsea	Terrace	c. 1825	29 July 1949	TQ2715078744; 51°29′36″N 0°10′11″W	1065887	1–14 Pelham Crescent More images
15–27 Pelham Crescent	Kensington and Chelsea	Terrace	c. 1825	29 July 1949	TQ2704378662; 51°29′33″N 0°10′17″W	1357470	15–27 Pelham Crescent More images
4 Cadogan Square	Kensington and Chelsea	House	c. 1880	15 April 1969	TQ2778679054; 51°29′46″N 0°09′38″W	1080740	4 Cadogan Square
52 Cadogan Square	Kensington and Chelsea SW1	House	1886-7	26 September 1962	TQ2771378977; 51°29′43″N 0°09′42″W	1358109	52 Cadogan Square More images
62 and 62b Cadogan Square	Kensington and Chelsea, London SW1	House	1803	24 June 1954	TQ2772178916; 51°29′41″N 0°09′42″W	1189431	62 and 62b Cadogan Square More images
68 Cadogan Square	Kensington and Chelsea, London SW1	House	1878	15 April 1969	TQ2772878892; 51°29′40″N 0°09′41″W	1080738	68 Cadogan Square More images
72 Cadogan Square	Kensington and Chelsea, London SW1	House	1878	15 April 1969	TQ2774078875; 51°29′40″N 0°09′41″W	1080739	72 Cadogan Square More images
35 and 37, Harrington Gardens SW7	Kensington and Chelsea	Semi Detached House	1881-4	15 April 1969	TQ2613578646; 51°29′34″N 0°11′04″W	1080620	35 and 37, Harrington Gardens SW7 More images
45 Harrington Gardens SW7	Kensington and Chelsea	House	1881-4	15 April 1969	TQ2606278629; 51°29′33″N 0°11′08″W	1080624	45 Harrington Gardens SW7
39 Harrington Gardens SW7	Kensington and Chelsea	House	1881-4	15 April 1969	TQ2610678639; 51°29′34″N 0°11′06″W	1080621	39 Harrington Gardens SW7 More images
28 and 29, Kensington Gate W8	Kensington and Chelsea	Semi Detached House	1847	15 April 1969	TQ2620279429; 51°29′59″N 0°11′00″W	1222711	28 and 29, Kensington Gate W8 More images
12, Kensington Palace Gardens W8	Kensington and Chelsea	House	After 1844	15 April 1969	TQ2564980313; 51°30′28″N 0°11′27″W	1223941	12, Kensington Palace Gardens W8
44, Tite Street SW3	Kensington and Chelsea	House	1878–80	15 April 1969	TQ2780377885; 51°29′08″N 0°09′39″W	1227011	44, Tite Street SW3 More images
1–3, Kensington Gate W8	Kensington and Chelsea	Terrace	1847	15 April 1969	TQ2619679382; 51°29′57″N 0°11′00″W	1222679	1–3, Kensington Gate W8 More images
16 and 17, Kensington Gate W8	Kensington and Chelsea	Semi Detached House	1847	15 April 1969	TQ2627879429; 51°29′59″N 0°10′56″W	1222710	16 and 17, Kensington Gate W8
1–6, Royal Crescent, W11	Kensington and Chelsea	House	1846	15 April 1969	TQ2413480054; 51°30′21″N 0°12′46″W	1226300	1–6, Royal Crescent, W11
Cohen House	64 Old Church Street, SW3	House	1936	23 March 1970	TQ2687778092; 51°29′15″N 0°10′26″W	1225772	Cohen House More images
14 and 15, Kensington Gate W8	Kensington and Chelsea	Semi Detached House	1847	15 April 1969	TQ2628079387; 51°29′58″N 0°10′56″W	1222708	14 and 15, Kensington Gate W8
15, Kensington Palace Gardens W8	Kensington	House	1854-6	15 April 1969	TQ2570480148; 51°30′23″N 0°11′25″W	1224113	15, Kensington Palace Gardens W8
18 and 19, Kensington Palace Gardens, W8	Kensington and Chelsea	House	1845–47	15 April 1969	TQ2558080236; 51°30′26″N 0°11′31″W	1266954	18 and 19, Kensington Palace Gardens, W8 More images
7–44 Royal Crescent, W11	Kensington and Chelsea	Terrace	1846	15 April 1969	TQ2394979988; 51°30′19″N 0°12′56″W	1265914	7–44 Royal Crescent, W11
24, Kensington Palace, W8	Kensington and Chelsea	Town House	1845-circa 1849	15 April 1969	TQ2552280432; 51°30′32″N 0°11′34″W	1266930	24, Kensington Palace, W8
4–13, Kensington Gate, W8	Kensington and Chelsea	Terrace	1847	15 April 1969	TQ2624079385; 51°29′58″N 0°10′58″W	1267726	4–13, Kensington Gate, W8
167, Queen's Gate, SW7	Kensington and Chelsea	Town House	1888-9	7 November 1984	TQ2649779175; 51°29′51″N 0°10′45″W	1266000	167, Queen's Gate, SW7 More images
18–27, Kensington Gate W8	Kensington and Chelsea	Terrace	1847	15 April 1969	TQ2622979430; 51°29′59″N 0°10′58″W	1267642	18–27, Kensington Gate W8 More images
9–18,11A and 18A, Collingham Gardens, SW5	Kensington and Chelsea	House	1881-4	15 April 1969	TQ2588478528; 51°29′30″N 0°11′17″W	1294000	9–18,11A and 18A, Collingham Gardens, SW5 More images
1–29 Pelham Place	Kensington and Chelsea	Terrace	1833	29 July 1949	TQ2702878723; 51°29′35″N 0°10′18″W	1357487	1–29 Pelham Place More images
1-8 Collingham Gardens	Earls Court SW5	House	1881-4	15 April 1969	TQ2593878531; 51°29′30″N 0°11′15″W	1358133	1-8 Collingham Gardens More images
40, Chelsea Square SW3	Kensington and Chelsea	House	1930	6 July 1981	TQ2693478115; 51°29′16″N 0°10′23″W	1358140	40, Chelsea Square SW3
170–178, Holland Park Avenue, W11	Kensington and Chelsea	Terrace	c. 1840	7 November 1984	TQ2417480052; 51°30′21″N 0°12′44″W	1358200	170–178, Holland Park Avenue, W11 More images
10 Palace Gate SW7	Kensington and Chelsea	Flats	1937	9 March 1982	TQ2617579459; 51°30′00″N 0°11′01″W	1357457	10 Palace Gate SW7 More images
43, Harrington Gardens SW7	Kensington and Chelsea	House	1881-4	15 April 1969	TQ2608378629; 51°29′33″N 0°11′07″W	1080623	43, Harrington Gardens SW7 More images
41, Harrington Gardens SW7	Kensington and Chelsea	House	1883	15 April 1969	TQ2609678635; 51°29′33″N 0°11′06″W	1080622	41, Harrington Gardens SW7 More images
8 Melbury Road	Kensington and Chelsea	Detached House	1875	30 August 1961	TQ2478379344; 51°29′57″N 0°12′13″W	1225615	8 Melbury Road More images
217 King's Road	Kensington and Chelsea	House	c. 1750	24 June 1954	TQ2712177988; 51°29′12″N 0°10′14″W	1266669	217 King's Road More images
213 and 215 King's Road	Chelsea SW3	Terrace	1720	24 June 1954	TQ2712477996; 51°29′12″N 0°10′14″W	1266690	213 and 215 King's Road More images
55 and 57, Melbury Road W14	Kensington and Chelsea	House	Late 19th century	30 August 1961	TQ2495179326; 51°29′57″N 0°12′05″W	1225641	55 and 57, Melbury Road W14
Tomb of Emmeline Pankhurst	Brompton Cemetery	Tomb	1930	7 November 1984	TQ 25522 78066; 51°29′15″N 0°11′37″W	1225716	Tomb of Emmeline Pankhurst More images

== See also ==
- Grade I listed buildings in Kensington and Chelsea
