= Henry Thomas Ryall =

English line, stipple and mixed-method engraver

- Born: 3 August 1811; Frome, Somerset
- Died: 14 September 1867 (aged 56); Cookham, Berkshire
- Known for: Engraving

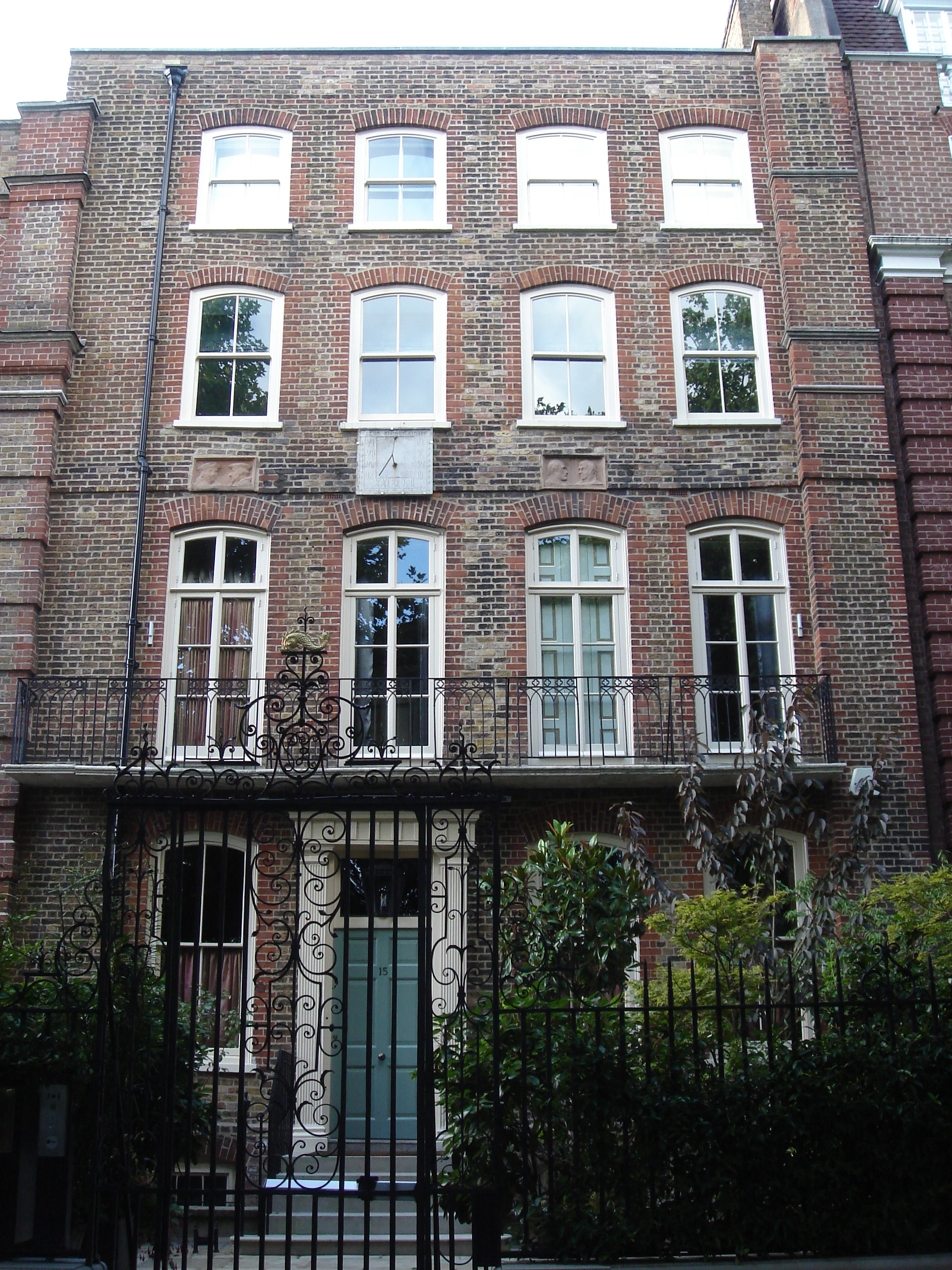
15 Cheyne Walk, Chelsea, London, where Ryall once lived

Henry Thomas Ryall (August 1811 – 14 September 1867) was an English line, stipple and mixed-method engraver and later used mixed mezzotint.

Ryall was appointed the royal engraver by Queen Victoria. Forty of his works are in the National Portrait Gallery in London.

== Life ==
He was born at Frome, Somerset, in August 1811. He was a pupil of Samuel William Reynolds, the mezzotinto engraver, but the style in which he at first worked was that known as ‘chalk’ or ‘stipple.’ He began his career by engraving plates for the editions of Edmund Lodge's Portraits of Illustrious Personages of Great Britain, and for the series of Portraits of Eminent Conservatives and Statesmen, as well as for Charles Heath's Book of Beauty and other works.

In 1861, Ryall was living with his wife Georgina, niece and two servants at 15 Cheyne Walk, Chelsea.

Ryall died at his residence at Cookham, Berkshire, on 14 September 1867.

== Works ==
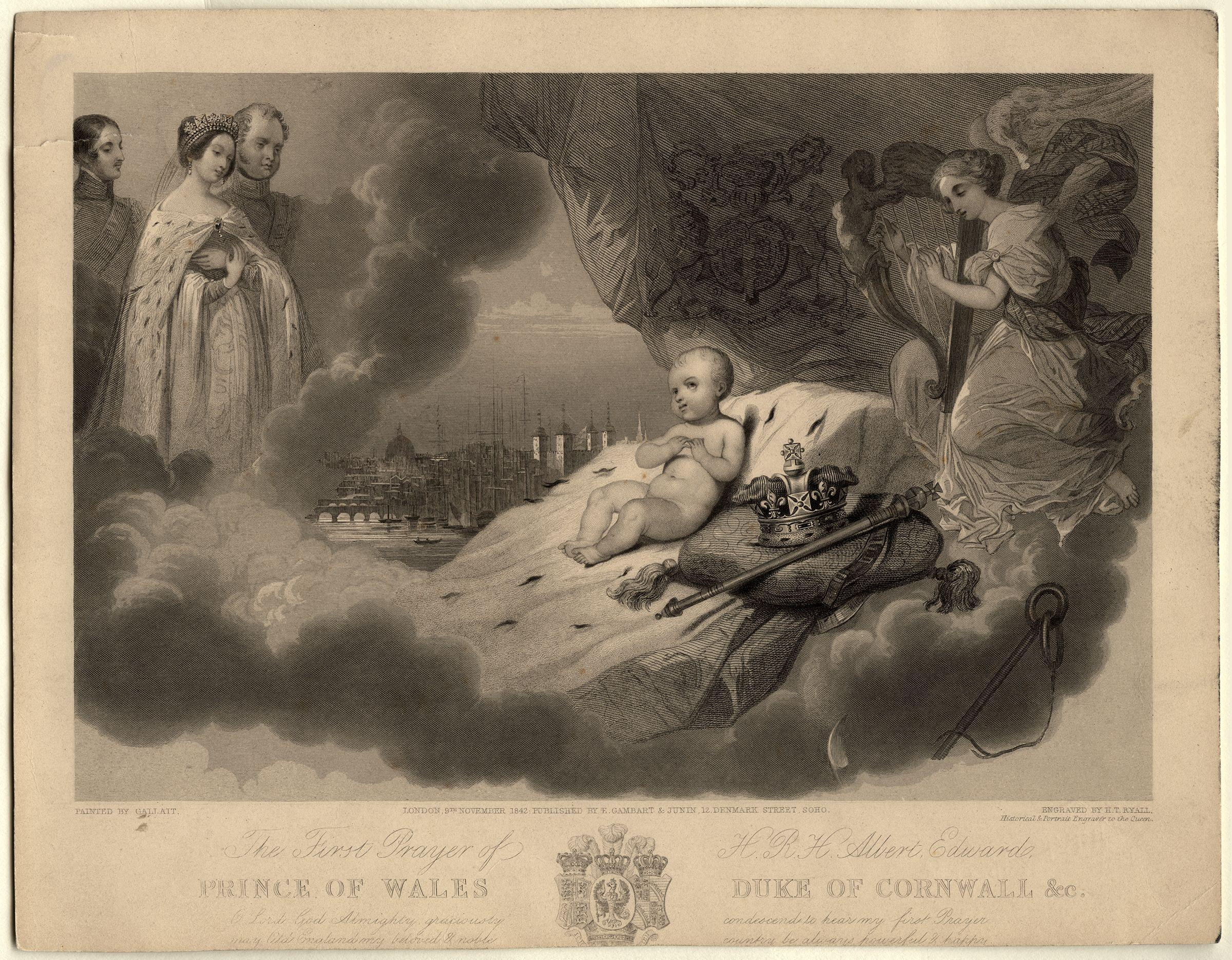
The First Prayer of Albert Edward Prince of Wales Duke of Cornwall &c

Ryall's larger plates are a combination of line and stipple. They include The Coronation of Queen Victoria, after the picture by Sir George Hayter, and The Christening of the Princess Royal, after Charles Robert Leslie, the engraving that gained him the honorary appointment of historical engraver to the queen. He also engraved Christopher Columbus at the Convent of La Rabida, after Sir David Wilkie; The Blind Girl at the Holy Well, after Sir Frederick William Burton, the first publication of the Royal Irish Art Union; Landais Peasants going to Market and Changing Pasture, after Rosa Bonheur; The Death of a Stag, The Combat, The Fight for the Standard, Just Caught, and Dogs and their Game (a series of six plates), after Richard Ansdell; The Halt and The Keeper's Daughter, after Ansdell and William Powell Frith; The Pursuit of Pleasure and Home! The Return from the Crimea, after Sir Joseph Noel Paton; Knox administering the first Protestant Sacrament in Scotland, after William Bonnar; Queen Victoria and the Prince of Wales, after Robert Thorburn; The Princess Helena and Prince Alfred, after Franz Xaver Winterhalter; Adam and Eve (The Temptation and the Fall), after Claude Marie Dubufe; Devotion, after Édouard Frère; A Duel after a Bal Masqué, after Jean-Léon Gérôme; The Prayer, after Jean-Baptiste Jules Trayer; and numerous plates after Sir Edwin Landseer.

He engraved also Sir William Charles Ross's miniatures of Queen Victoria and the prince consort, and several other portraits. He painted occasionally in oils, and exhibited in 1846 at the Society of British Artists Waiting for an Answer, and at the Royal Academy A Reverie in 1852, and The Crochet Lesson in 1859.
