= Palace Gate =

Street in Kensington, London

Coordinates: 51.5006°N 0.1840°W

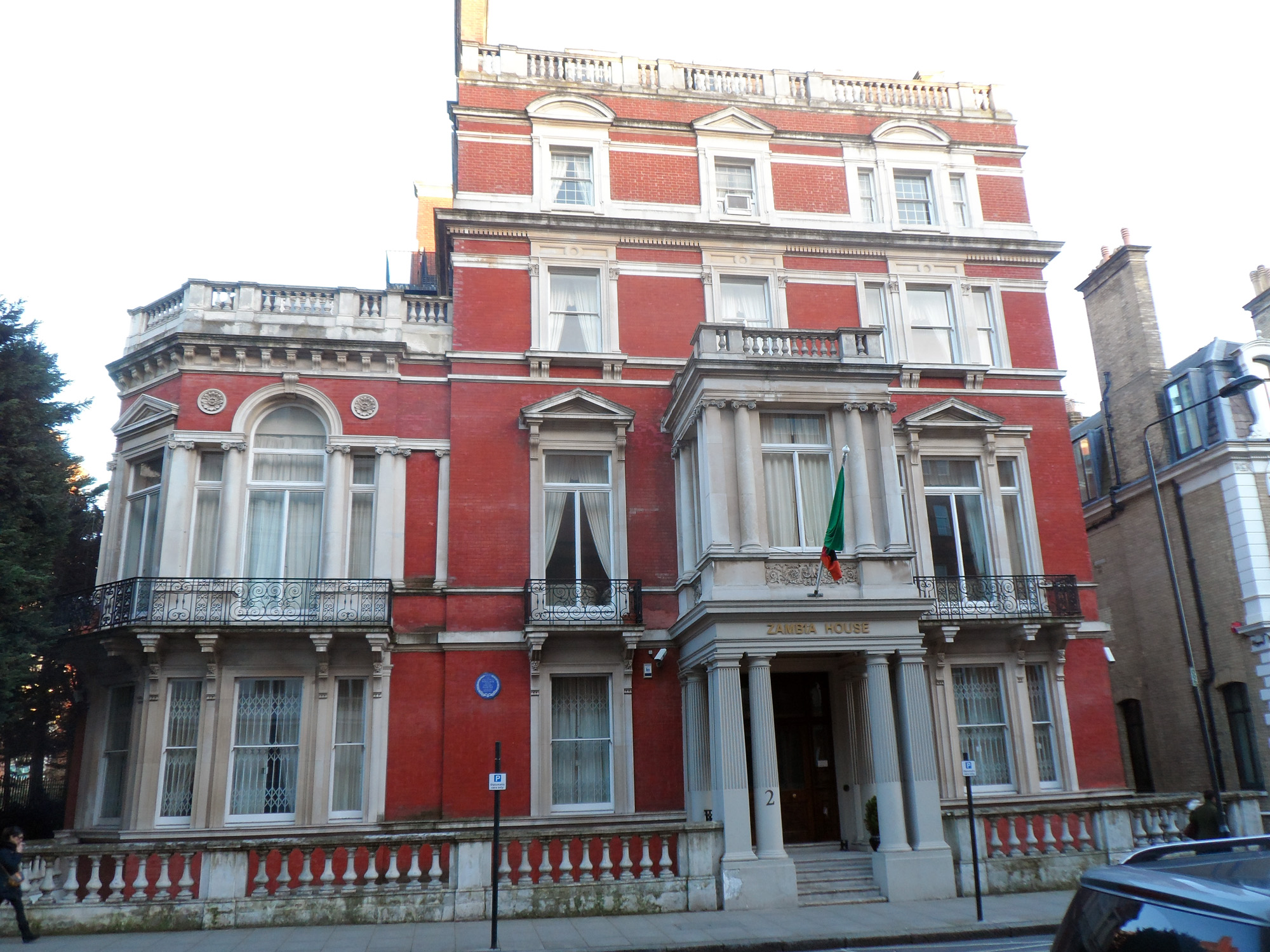
2 Palace Gate

Palace Gate is a street south of Kensington Gardens in London, England. It was previously part of Gloucester Road, and was initially developed in the 1860s.

1a Palace Gate and 10 Palace Gate are both Grade II* listed buildings. The street is home to part of the Embassy of South Korea and the Zambian High Commission ("Zambia House") at 2 Palace Gate, former home of the Victorian Pre-Raphaelite artist Sir John Everett Millais (1829–1896), with a blue plaque.
