= Cecil Gordon Lawson =

English painter

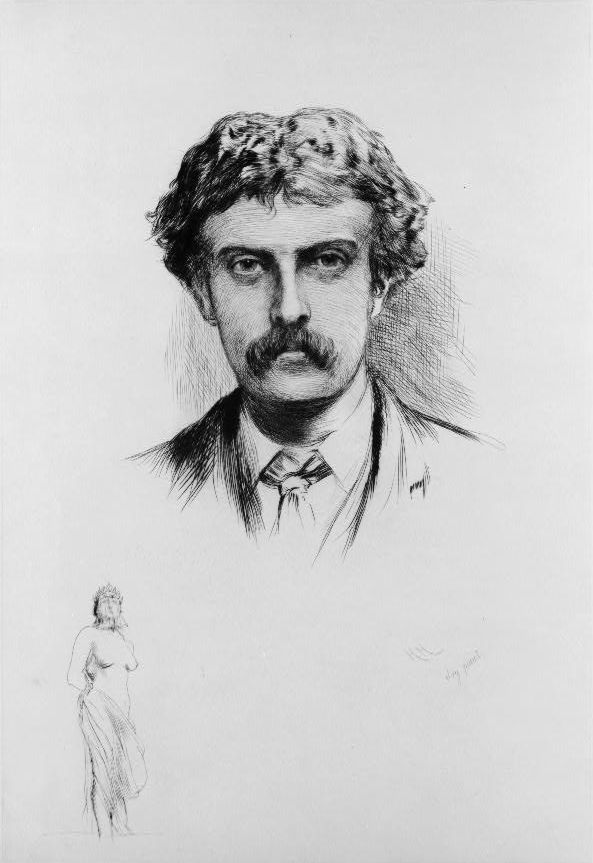
- Portrait of Lawson by Hubert von Herkomer, 1883
- Born: 3 December 1849; Fountain Place, Wellington, Shropshire
- Died: 10 June 1882 (aged 32); London
- Known for: landscape painting
- Spouse: Constance Birnie Philip (m. 1879)
- Children: Cecil Constant Philip Lawson (1880–1967)

Cecil Gordon Lawson (3 December 1849 – 10 June 1882 London) was a British landscapist and illustrator.

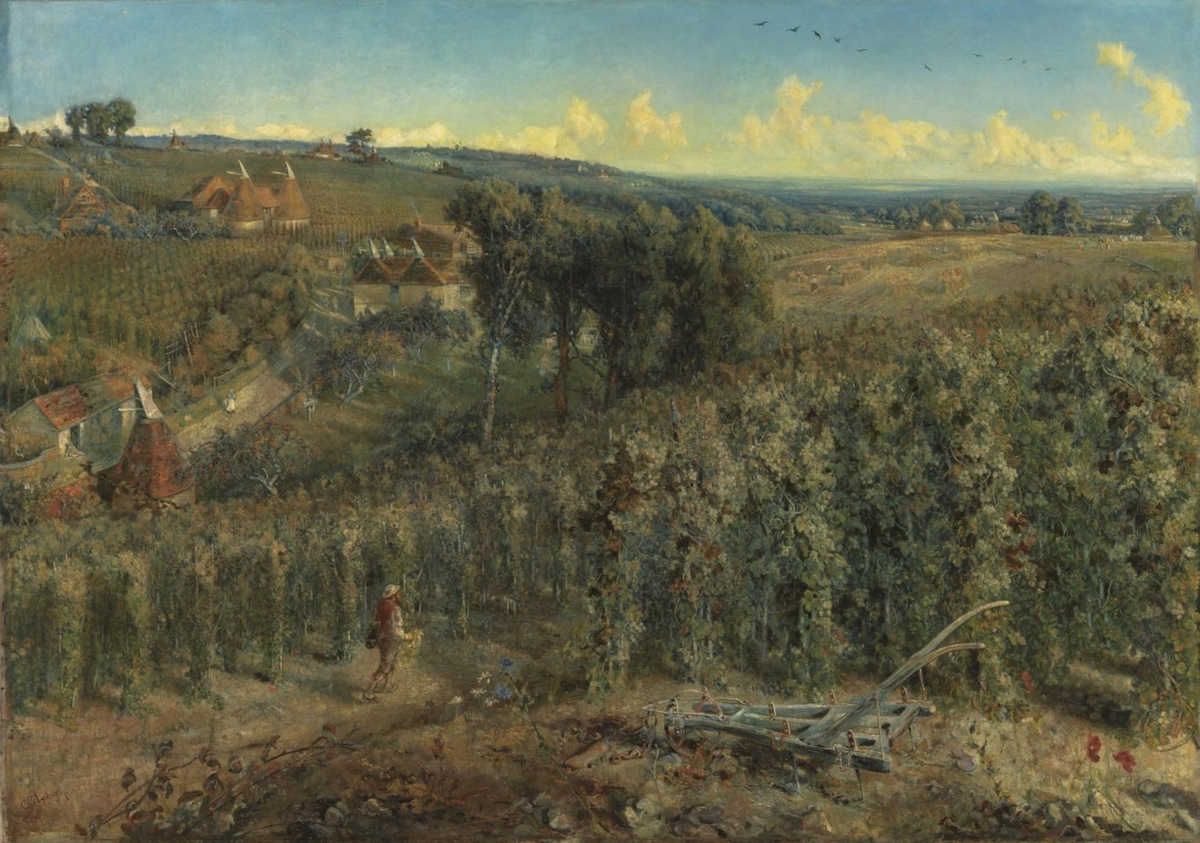
The Hop-Gardens of England, 1874, oils, Tate

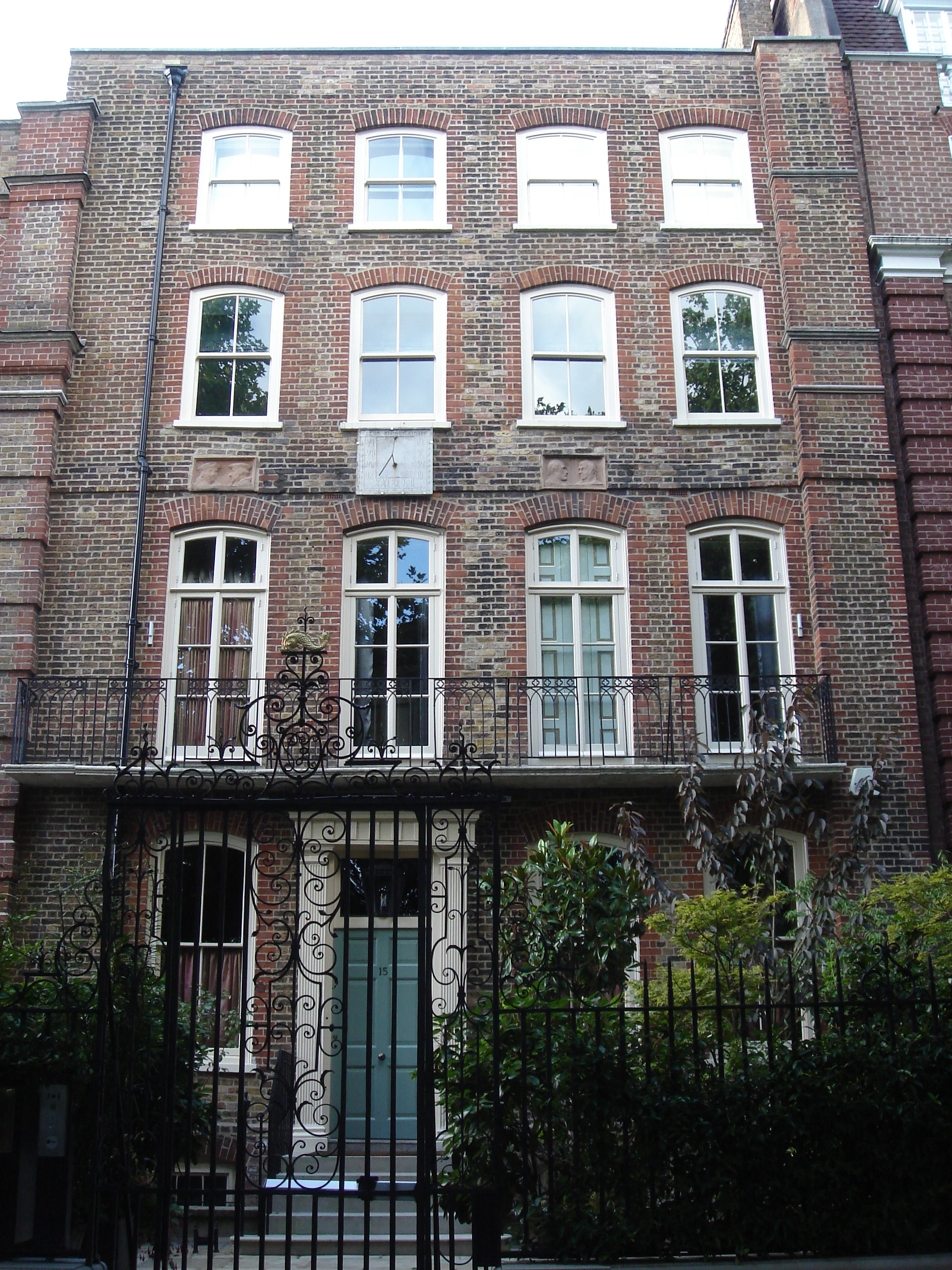
15 Cheyne Walk, Chelsea, London, where Lawson once lived

== Life ==
The youngest son of William Lawson of Edinburgh, a well-regarded portrait painter, and of a mother also known for her flower pieces, he was born in Fountain Place in Wellington, Shropshire. Two of his brothers (one of them, Malcolm, a clever musician and songwriter) were trained as artists, and Cecil was from childhood devoted to art with the intensity of a serious nature. Soon after his birth, the Lawsons moved to London.

In 1871, Lawson was living with his parents at 15 Cheyne Walk, Chelsea, along with his two older brothers Francis Wilfrid Lawson (1842–1935), a "historical painter and designer" and Malcolm Leonard Lawson (1847–1918), a "professor of music."

Lawson's first works were studies of fruit, flowers, etc., in the manner of William Henry Hunt; followed by riverside Chelsea subjects. His first exhibit at the Royal Academy (1870) was Cheyne Walk, and in 1871 he sent two other Chelsea subjects. These gained full recognition from fellow-artists, if not from the public. Among his friends were now numbered Fred Walker, GJ Pinwell and their associates, the so-called Idyllic school. Following them, he made a certain number of drawings for wood engraving. In 1871 he contributed Summer Showers to a mixed charity exhibition held in support of those affected by the Franco-Prussian War.

Lawson's Chelsea pictures had been painted in rather sombre tones; in A Hymn to Spring (1871–72; Santa Barbara Museum of Art) which was rejected by the Academy, he turned to a more colourful approach, helped by work done in North Wales and Ireland. Early in 1874 he made a short tour in the Netherlands, Belgium and Paris; and in the summer he painted the Kent countryside in his large The Hop-Gardens of England (1874; Tate, London). This was much praised at the Academy of 1876.

Lawson's triumph was with the luxuriant canvas, The Minister's Garden, exhibited in 1878 at the Grosvenor Gallery, and afterwards bought by Manchester Art Gallery. His 1878 showing at the Grosvenor Gallery was accompanied by Strayed (1878; Private collection) and Into the Valley: A Pastoral (1878; Private collection). This triumph was followed by several works conceived in a new and tragic mood. Lawson's health began to fail, but he worked on. His later subjects are from the neighbourhood where he lived (the most famous being The August Moon, now Tate Britain, London) or from Yorkshire. Towards the end of 1881 he went to the French Riviera, returned in the spring.

Lawson suffered a relapse, and a visit to Eastbourne proved of no benefit. He died at West Brompton, of inflammation of the lungs, on 10 June 1882, and was buried at Haslemere, Surrey.

== Assessment ==
Lawson may be said to have restored to English landscape the tradition of Thomas Gainsborough, John Crome and John Constable, infused with an imaginative intensity of his own. Among English landscape painters of the latter part of the 19th century his is an outstanding name.

== Family ==
In 1879 he married Constance Birnie Philip (1854–1929), a daughter (and eldest child) of the sculptor John Birnie Philip, and settled at Haslemere. Constance's eldest sister Beatrix later married James McNeill Whistler in 1888, which would have made Lawson and Whistler brothers-in-law had Lawson lived. Constance and Cecil had one son, Cecil Constant Philip Lawson (1880–1967), born in London on 20 September 1880.

== Work ==
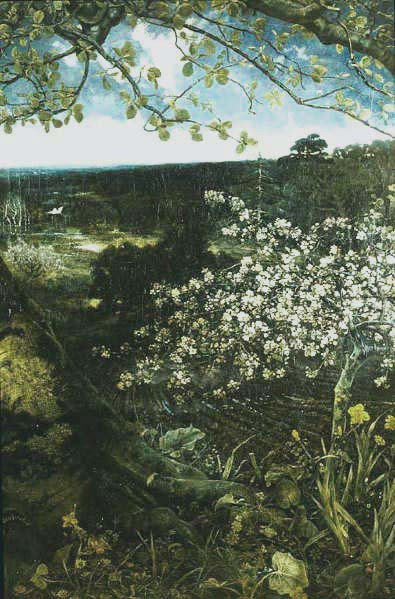
A Hymn to Spring, 1871. Oil on canvas.

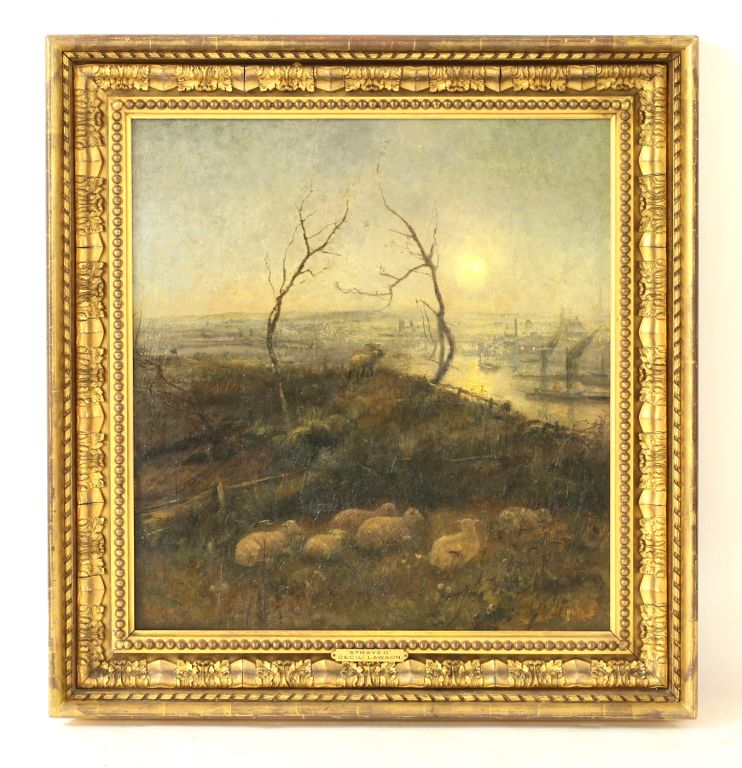
Strayed, 1878. Oil on canvas, (26 x 24 inches).

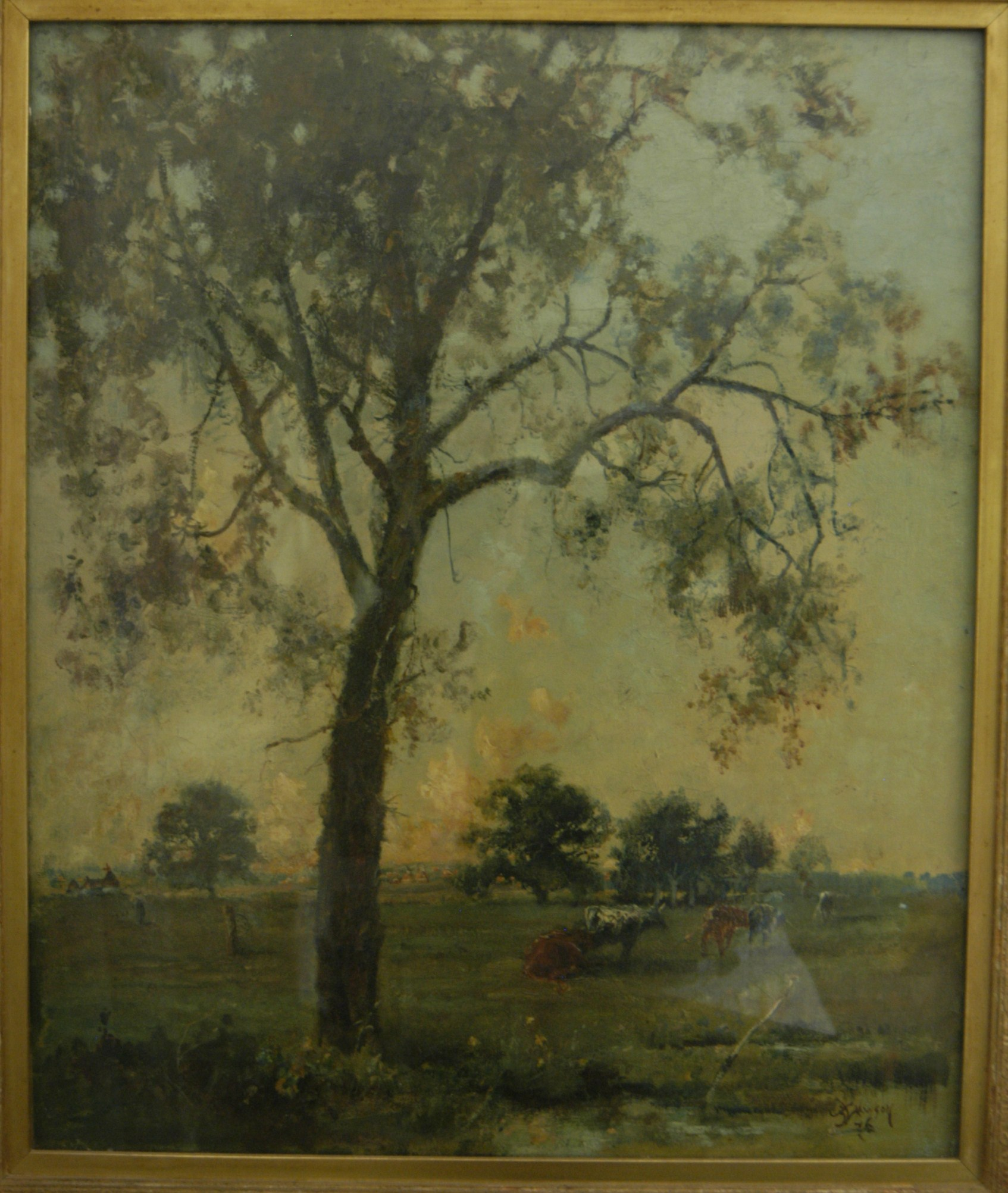
Kent landscape: Tree and Cattle, 1876. Oil on canvas.

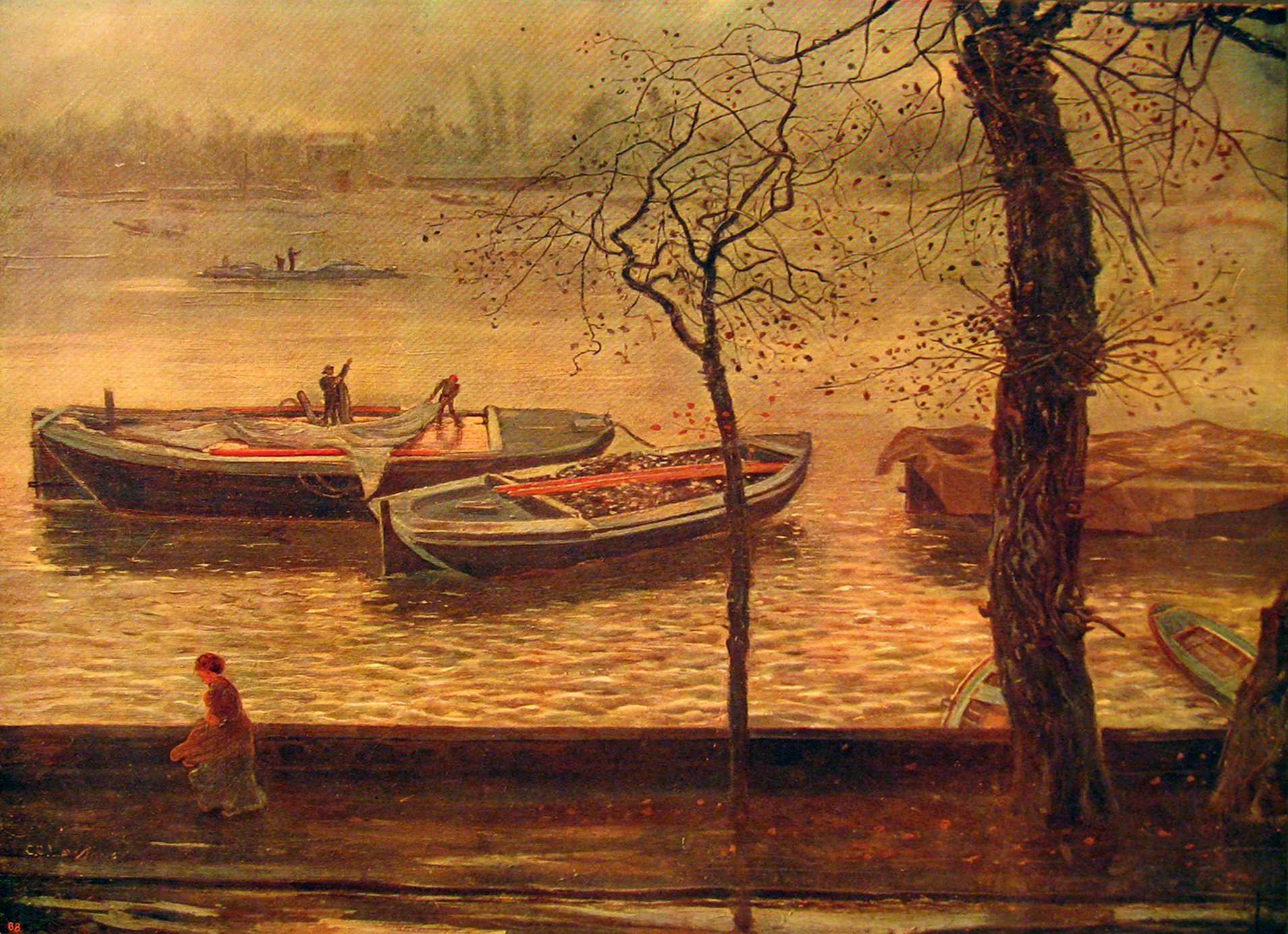
Battersea Reach, Oil on canvas.

== Notes ==
Attribution

This article incorporates text from a publication now in the public domain: Graves, Robert Edmund (1885–1900). "Lawson, Cecil Gordon". Dictionary of National Biography. London: Smith, Elder & Co.
