= Grade I listed buildings in the Royal Borough of Kensington and Chelsea =

List of buildings in the Royal Borough of Kensington and Chelsea

There are over 9,000 Grade I listed buildings in England. This page is a list of these buildings in the Royal Borough of Kensington and Chelsea.

== Buildings ==
Name	Location	Type	Completed (Note: The date given is the date used by Historic England as significant for the initial building or that of an important part in the structure's description.)	Date designated	Grid ref. (Note: Sometimes known as OSGB36, the grid reference is based on the British national grid reference system used by the Ordnance Survey.) Geo-coordinates	Entry number (Note: The "List Entry Number" is a unique number assigned to each listed building and scheduled monument by Historic England.)	Image
Chelsea Old Church (all Saints)	Kensington and Chelsea	Church	Early 16th century and later work	24 June 1954	TQ2710077596; 51°28′59″N 0°10′16″W	1189649	Chelsea Old Church (all Saints) More images
Church of Holy Trinity	Sloane Street, Kensington and Chelsea	Church	1890	24 June 1954	TQ2802278746; 51°29′35″N 0°09′26″W	1265767	Church of Holy Trinity More images
Church of St John the Baptist, Holland Road W14	Kensington and Chelsea	Church	1874–1911	29 July 1949	TQ2404579770; 51°30′12″N 0°12′51″W	1080593	Church of St John the Baptist, Holland Road W14 More images
Church of St Luke	Kensington and Chelsea	Church	1824	24 June 1954	TQ2719378332; 51°29′23″N 0°10′10″W	1265622	Church of St Luke More images
Debenham House	8 Addison Road, Kensington and Chelsea	House	1905-7	15 April 1969	TQ2442179690; 51°30′09″N 0°12′32″W	1080783	Debenham House More images
Gate Piers to Forecourt, Stable Yard, Holland Park	Kensington and Chelsea	Gate Pier	1629	15 April 1969	TQ2488779664; 51°30′08″N 0°12′08″W	1223780	Gate Piers to Forecourt, Stable Yard, Holland Park More images
Holland House	Kensington and Chelsea	Town House	Early 17th century	29 July 1949	TQ2488579723; 51°30′10″N 0°12′08″W	1267135	Holland House More images
Kensington Palace	Palace Green, Kensington and Chelsea	Royal Palace	1661	15 April 1969	TQ2584480027; 51°30′19″N 0°11′17″W	1223861	Kensington Palace More images
Natural History Museum	Exhibition Road, Kensington and Chelsea	Museum	1873–81	15 April 1969	TQ2668079075; 51°29′47″N 0°10′35″W	1080675	Natural History Museum More images
Orangery at Kensington Palace	Palace Green, Kensington and Chelsea	Orangery	1704	15 April 1969	TQ2586780190; 51°30′24″N 0°11′16″W	1223783	Orangery at Kensington Palace More images
Statue of Charles II, Royal Hospital Chelsea	Kensington and Chelsea	Statue	c. 1700	15 April 1969	TQ2800878072; 51°29′14″N 0°09′28″W	1226477	Statue of Charles II, Royal Hospital Chelsea More images
The Anglican Chapel	Kensal Green Cemetery, Kensington and Chelsea	Chapel	1833	30 October 1964	TQ2317182536; 51°31′42″N 0°13′33″W	1190995	The Anglican Chapel More images
The Royal Hospital Entrance Gates and Lodges (on North West Side of Burton's Court) Fronting St Leonard's Terrace	Kensington and Chelsea	Gate	1682–1702	15 April 1969	TQ2780178260; 51°29′20″N 0°09′38″W	1265915	The Royal Hospital Entrance Gates and Lodges (on North West Side of Burton's Court) Fronting St Leonard's Terrace More images
The Royal Hospital Main Hospital Buildings Seven Three Storey Connected Blocks	Kensington and Chelsea	Hospital	1682–1702	15 April 1969	TQ2797278104; 51°29′15″N 0°09′30″W	1226301	The Royal Hospital Main Hospital Buildings Seven Three Storey Connected Blocks More images
The Tower House, 29 Melbury Road	Kensington and Chelsea	Detached House	1874–81	29 July 1949	TQ2481979406; 51°29′59″N 0°12′11″W	1225632	The Tower House, 29 Melbury Road More images
Victoria and Albert Museum	Kensington and Chelsea	Museum	1884	15 April 1969	TQ2698579096; 51°29′48″N 0°10′20″W	1190187	Victoria and Albert Museum More images

== See also ==
- Grade II* listed buildings in Kensington and Chelsea
