= 15 Cheyne Walk =

House in Chelsea, London, England

Coordinates: 51°29′02″N 0°09′57″W

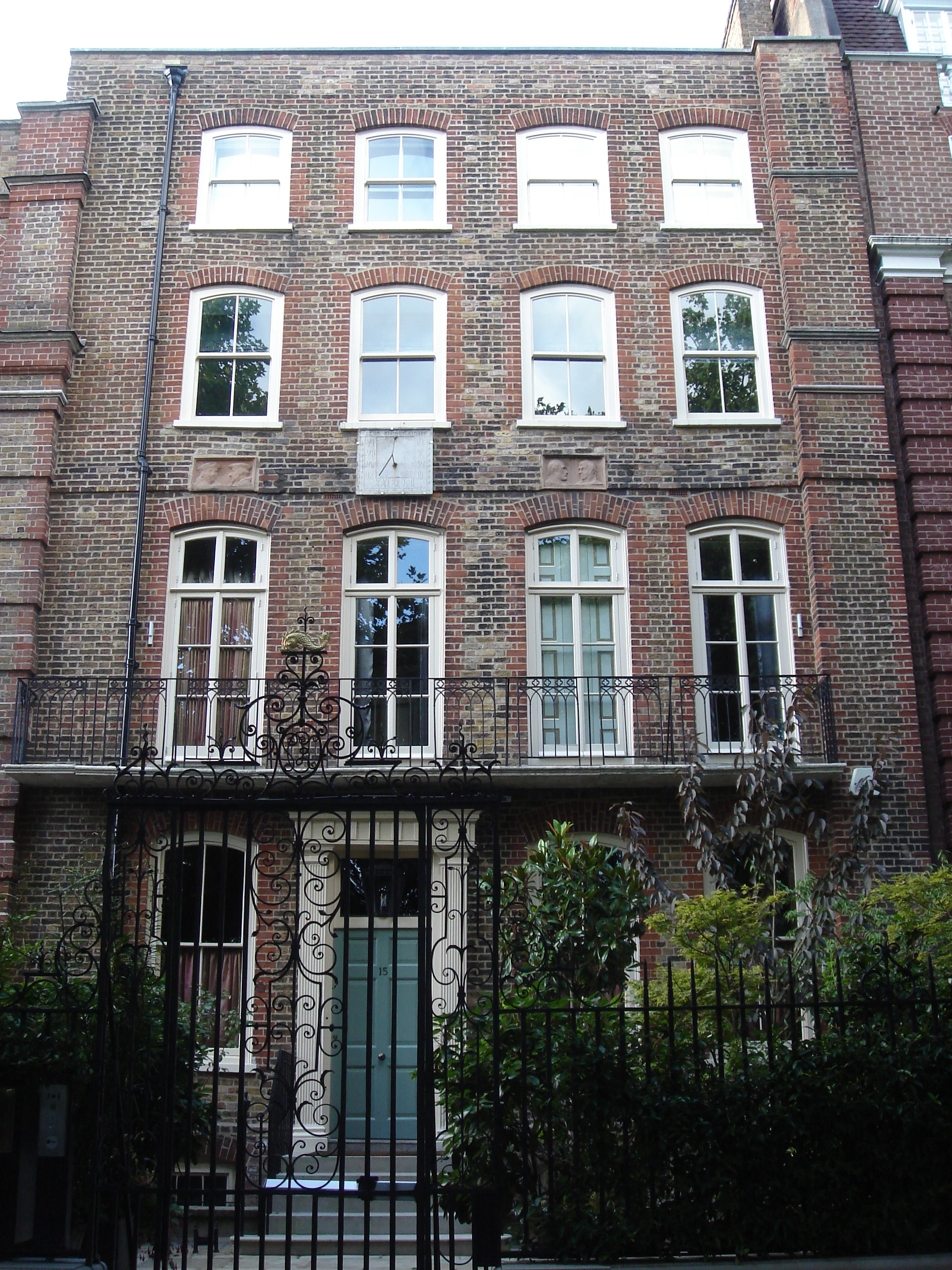
15 Cheyne Walk

15 Cheyne Walk is a Grade II* listed house on Cheyne Walk, Chelsea, London, built in 1718. It was originally known as Carlton House. It is considered to be a replica of 4 Cheyne Walk.

Notable former residents include the landscape painter Cecil Gordon Lawson, the engraver Henry Thomas Ryall, the Allason family, well known for their political and literary influence, and the Baron and Baroness Courtney of Penwith.

== History ==
When built, it would have been directly on the waterfront, and thus approachable by boat. With the building of Chelsea Embankment, it is now set some way back from the river, but it still has no buildings interrupting the view of the River Thames. It is a four-storey red-brick building with four windows on each floor at the front. The building is Grade II* listed but with a minimal description.

== Notable residents ==
The first person to live there was Admiral Sir John Balchen (then a captain), who lived there until his death at sea in 1744, aside from two periods in 1724 and 1725–28, when it was rented out to Captain Reginald RN and then to Captain Leonard Wynn RN.

On Balchen's death the house passed to his son-in-law Commodore Temple West (later vice-admiral), who had married Balchen's daughter Frances. The Wests lived there until 1755, two years before West's death in 1757.

In 1861, Henry Thomas Ryall was living there with his wife Georgina, niece, and two servants.

In 1871, Cecil Gordon Lawson (1849–1882), the landscape painter was living there with his parents (a number of his works still hang there), William Lawson of Edinburgh, a well-regarded portrait painter, and his wife also known for her flower pieces, along with his two older brothers Francis Wilfrid Lawson (1842–1935), a "historical painter and designer" and Malcolm Leonard Lawson (1847–1918), a "professor of music".

In 1918, Baron Courtney of Penwith was living there at the time of his death. Courtney was a member of Gladstone's second administration from 1880 to 1883 and served as Chairman of Ways and Means (Deputy Speaker of the House of Commons) from 1886 to 1893.

In 1919, the widowed Lady Courtney hosted the first meeting of the Fight the Famine Committee at 15 Cheyne Walk. The Save the Children Fund was to develop from that committee.

In 2002, as a "wreck in need of renovation" it was for sale for £5 million.

For about 40 years prior to 2002, it had been home to Lieutenant-Colonel James Allason MP, the Conservative Party politician, then his wife Nuala Allason (they divorced in 1974) and their son, fellow former Tory MP Rupert Allason, who also writes spy novels using the pen name Nigel West.

The empty house had subsequently been used as a location for the 2002 film The Gathering Storm, about Winston Churchill's wilderness years. It was used as the home of Churchill's friend Sir Desmond Morton, played by Jim Broadbent.

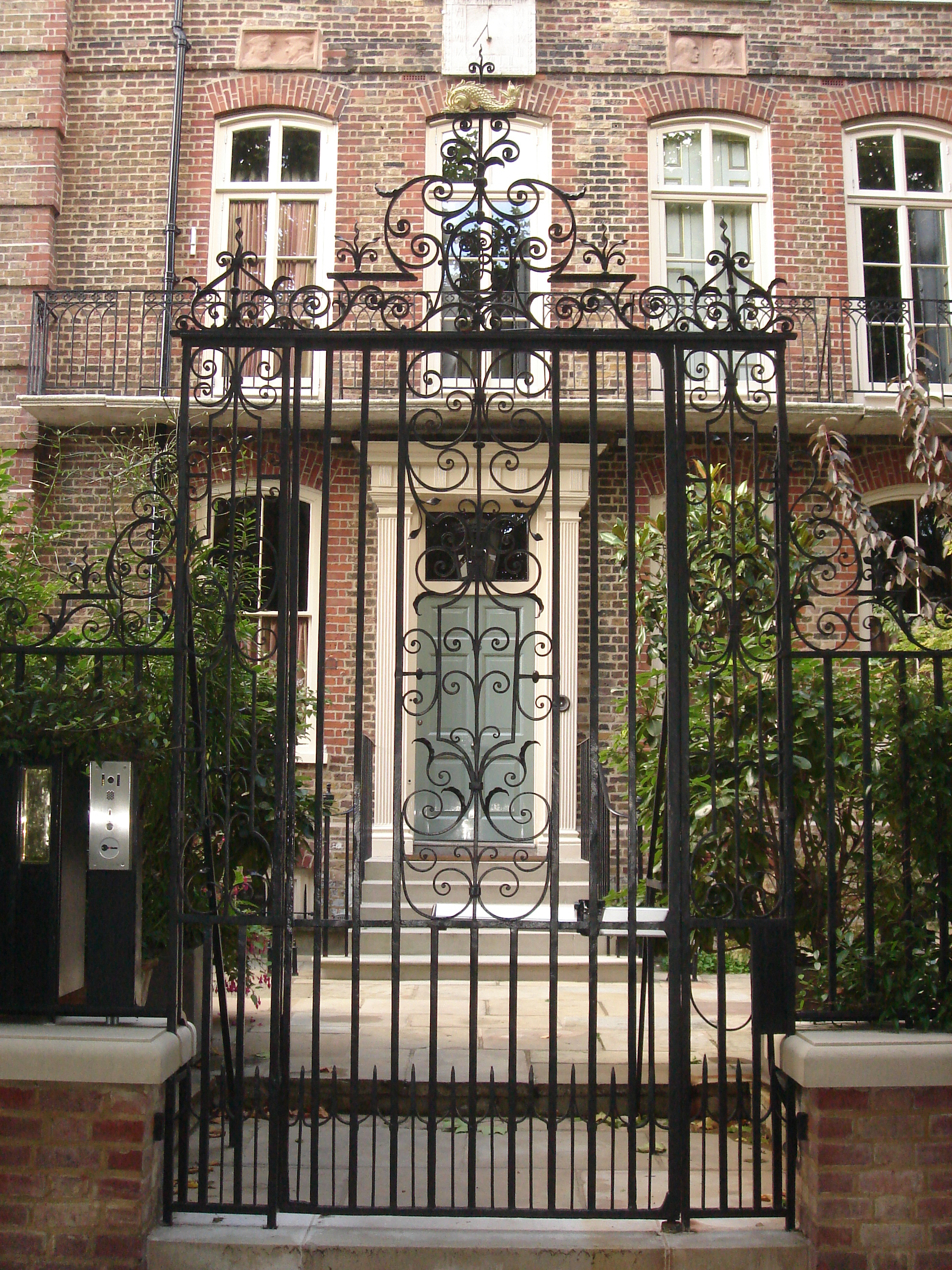
15 Cheyne Walk

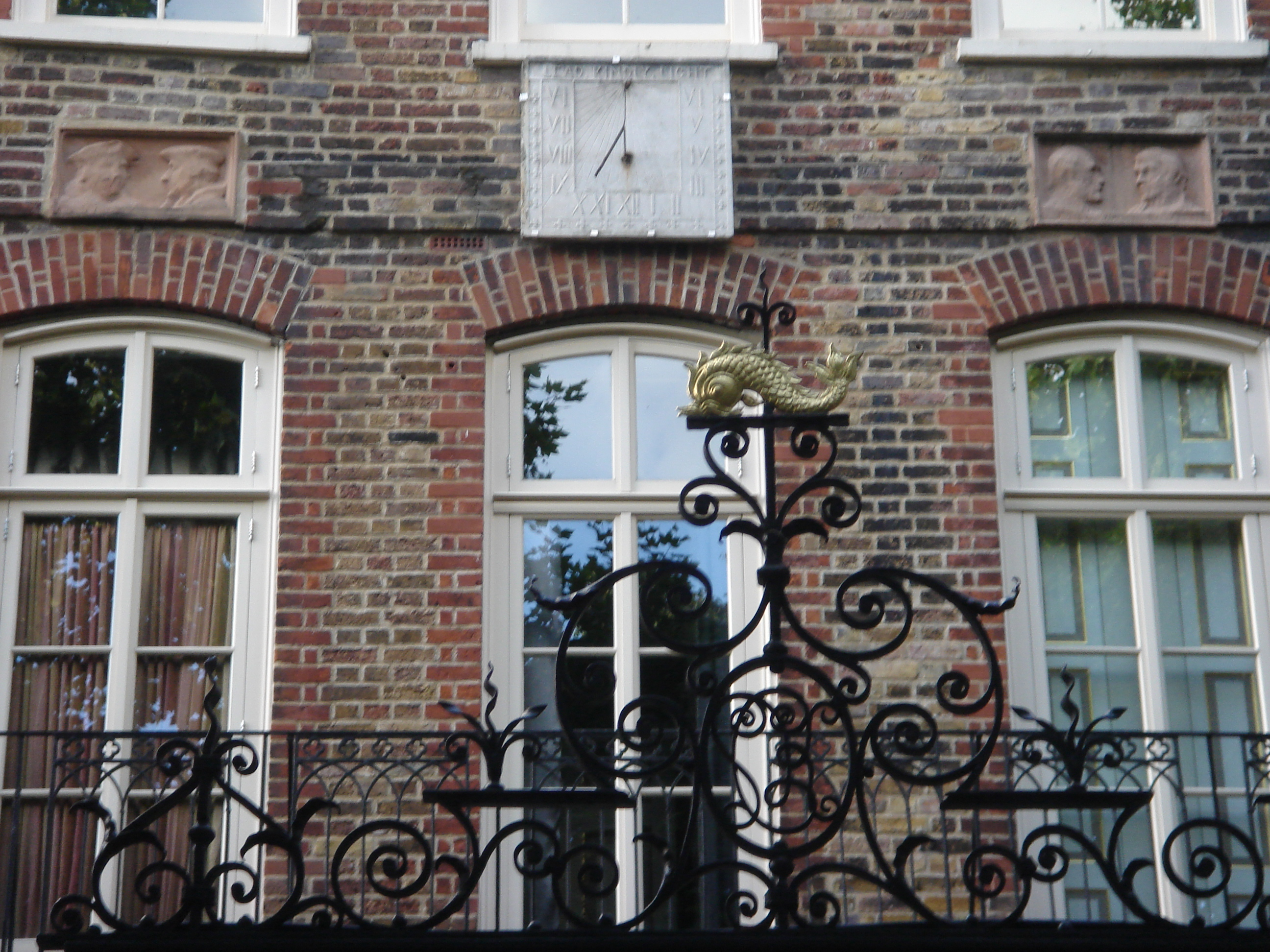
15 Cheyne Walk

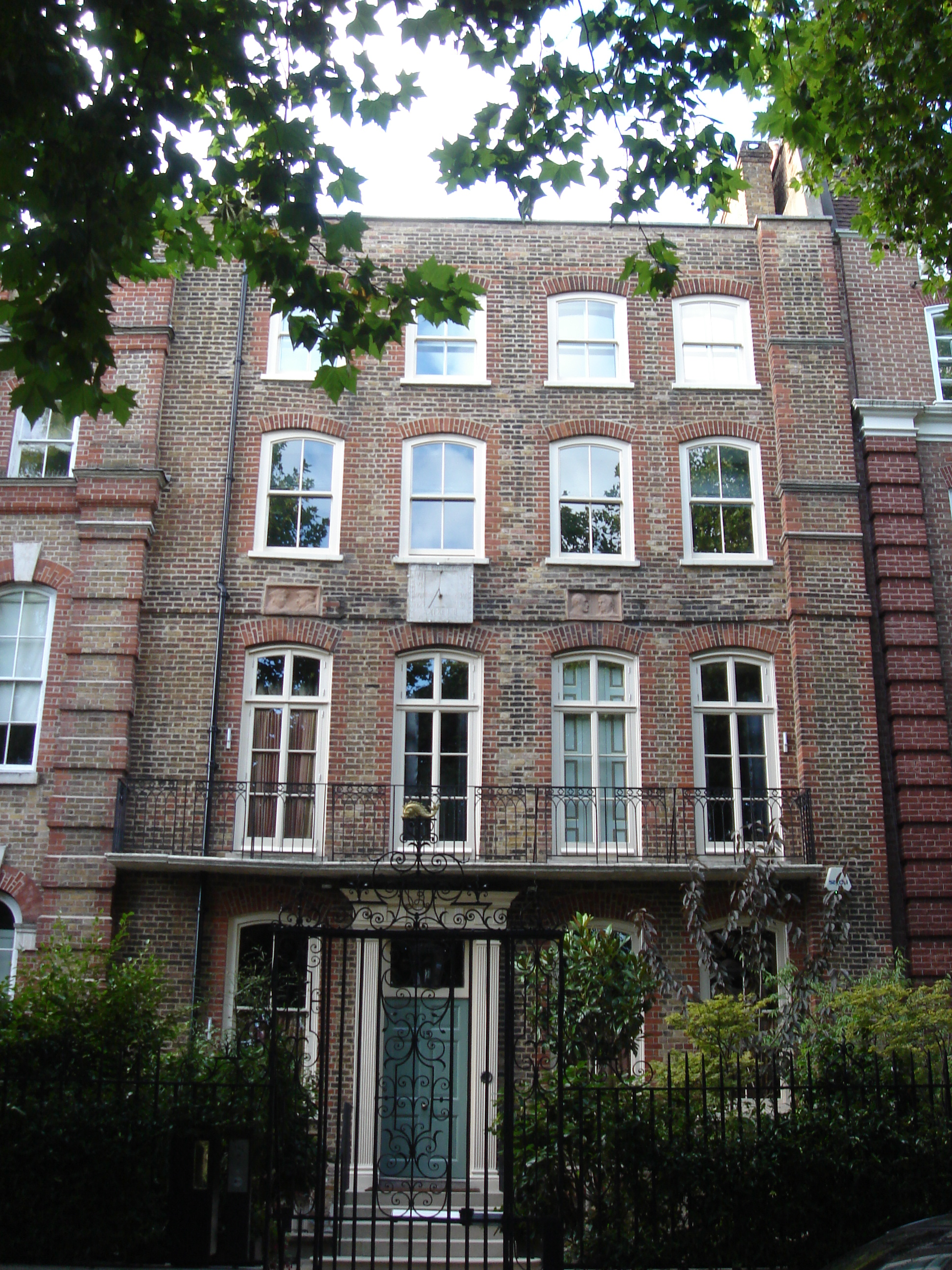
15 Cheyne Walk

== See also ==
- 4 Cheyne Walk
