= 6 Cheyne Walk =

House in Chelsea, London, England

Coordinates: 51°29′03″N 0°09′53″W

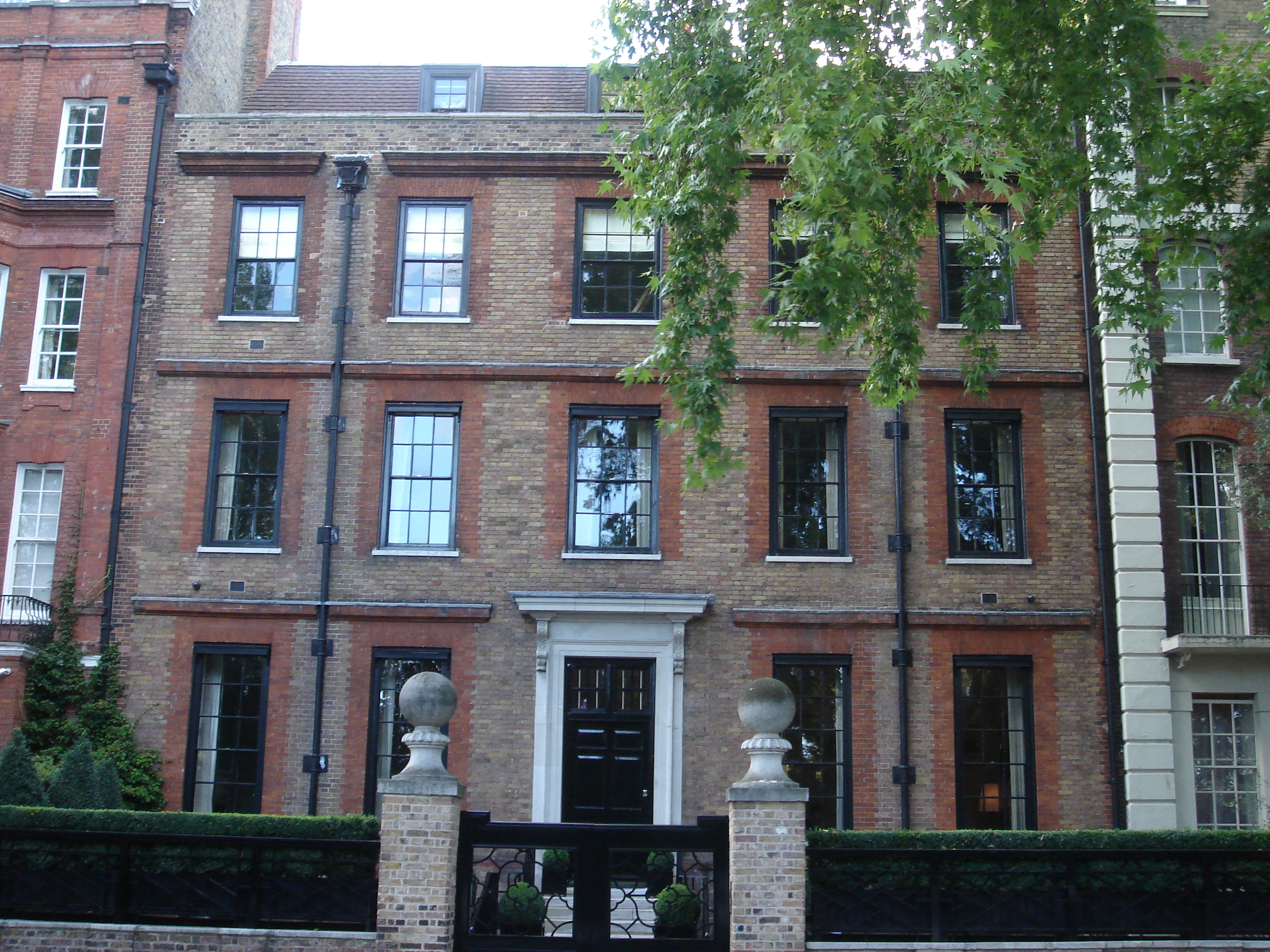
6 Cheyne Walk

6 Cheyne Walk is a Grade II* listed house on Cheyne Walk, Chelsea, London, built in 1718.

== See also ==
- 4 Cheyne Walk
