= 1a Palace Gate =

Grade II* listed house in Kensington, London

Coordinates: 51°30′05″N 0°11′04″W

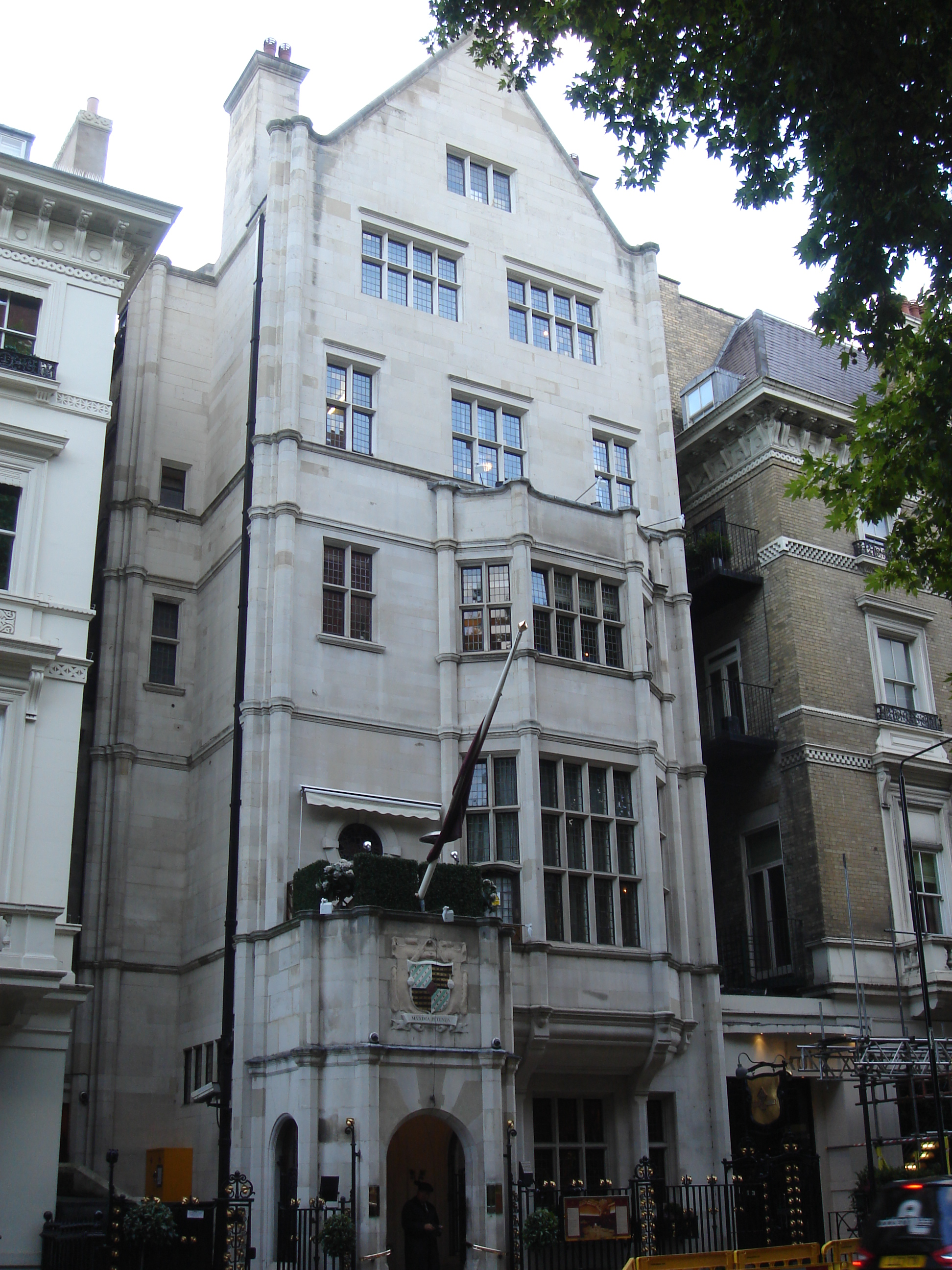
1a Palace Gate, Kensington W8

1a Palace Gate is a Grade II* listed house on Palace Gate, Kensington in London, England.

Construction of the house began in 1896 and was completed in 1898 by the architect C. J. Harold Cooper for William Alfred Johnstone.
