= 10 Palace Gate =

Apartment block in London, England

Coordinates: 51°29′59.8″N 0°11′1.2″W

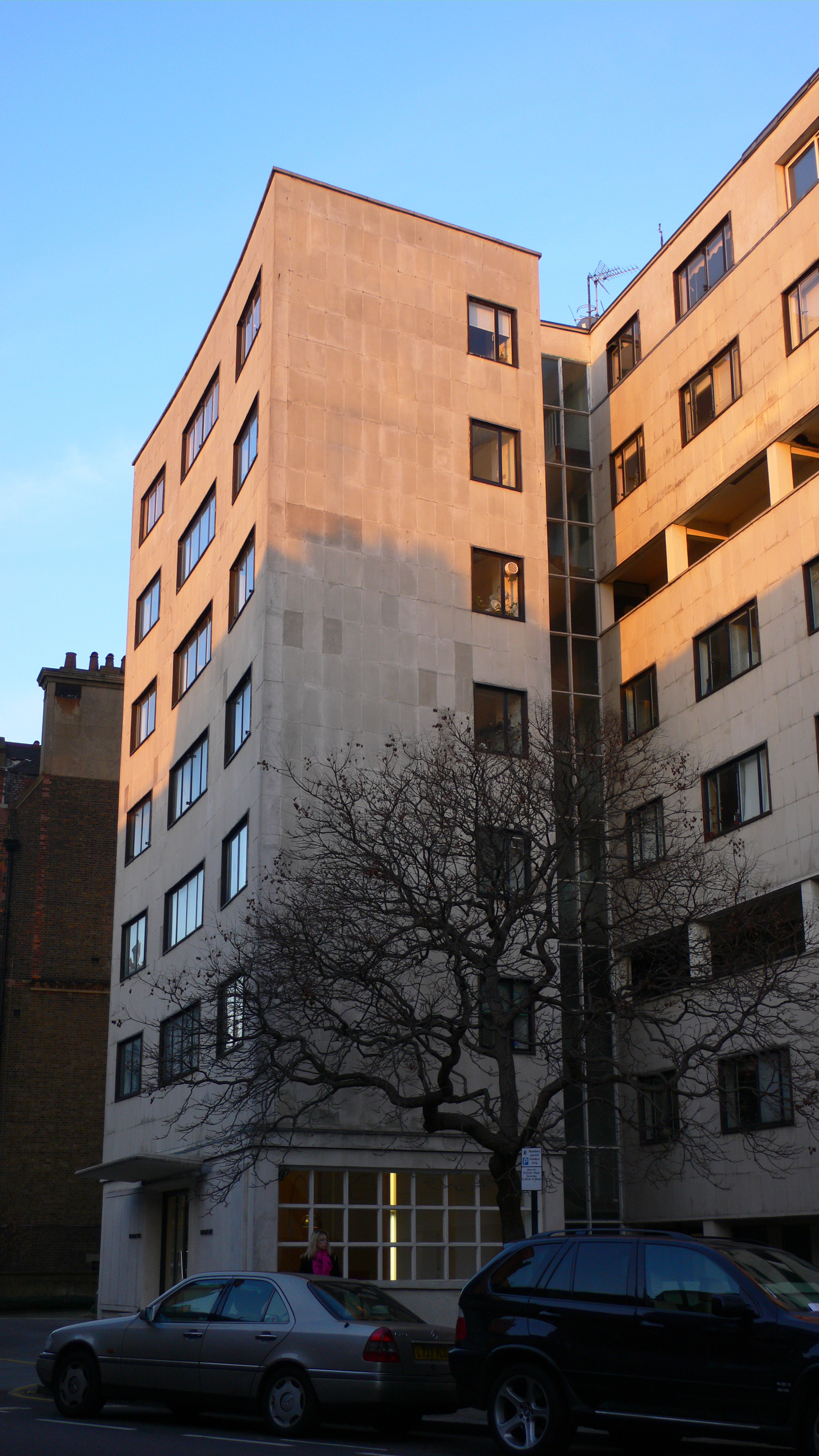
View of 10 Palace Gate

10 Palace Gate is an apartment block in Palace Gate, in the Kensington area of London, England, designed by Wells Coates.

Completed in 1939 for the builder Randall Bell, the building is a Modernist structure in the tradition of Le Corbusier and Walter Gropius, both of whom influenced Coates' work. Coates applied his own three-two system of spatial layout within this building for the first time, an idea he used to create variety within the units. The design, which divides the building into floors at various heights, enables the public spaces to be large and with high ceilings, while private portions of the flat such as bedrooms, bathrooms, service rooms and corridors were smaller in scale. In recent years heritage specialist – design & build contractor PAVEHALL PLC have sensitively refurbished and restored the entire building. The building is of significant interest to the 20th Century Society.

The building is Grade II* listed.
