= Stanley House, Chelsea =

House in Chelsea, London, England

Coordinates: 51.48105°N 0.18474°W

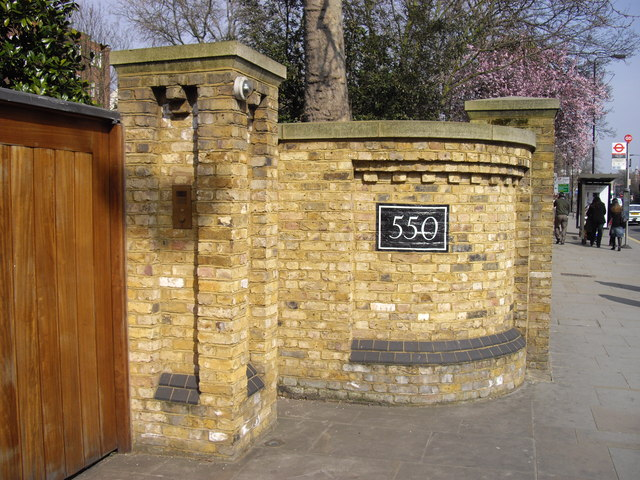
The entrance to Stanley House

Stanley House at 550 King's Road is a seventeenth-century house in Chelsea, London, the former house of Admiral Sir Charles Wager. It is a Grade II* listed building.

== History ==
The house was built for the Stanley family in 1691. In the early eighteenth century, it was occupied by Thomas Arundell, son of Henry Arundell, 5th Baron Arundell of Wardour, before becoming the home of Admiral Sir Charles Wager who died there in 1743. It was acquired by the Countess of Strathmore in 1777 before coming into the ownership of Sir William Hamilton, British Envoy at the Court of Naples who erected casts of the Elgin Marbles in the house (the first taken), in the early nineteenth century. It became the residence of the Principal of St Mark's College, Chelsea, a training school for teachers, in the mid-nineteenth century. The house was bought for £10 million by Boris Berezovsky in 2005.
