= 62 and 62b Cadogan Square =

Coordinates: 51°29′41″N 0°09′41″W

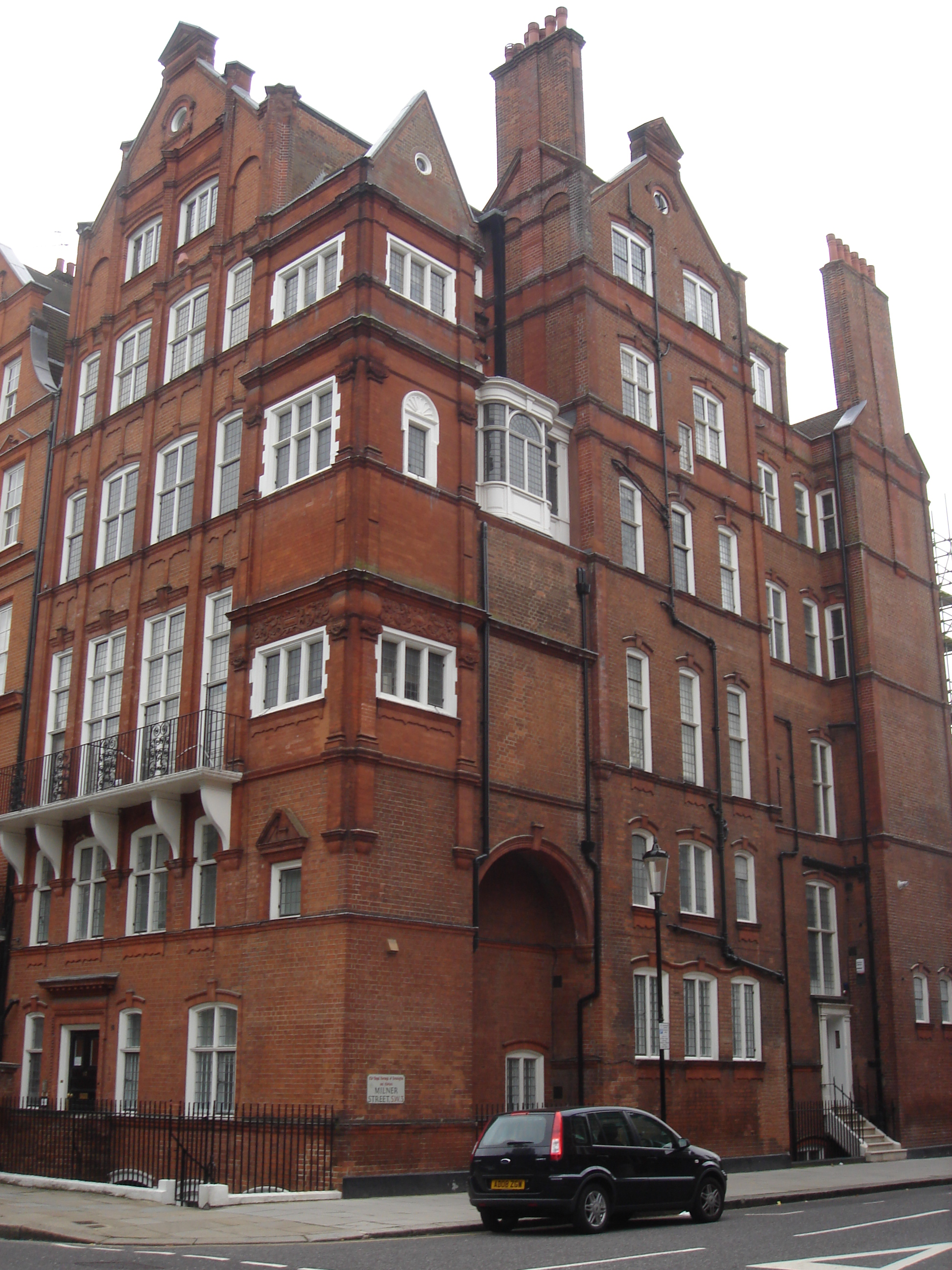
62 and 62b Cadogan Square

62 and 62b Cadogan Square is a Grade II* listed building in Cadogan Square, London SW1.

It was built in the British Queen Anne Revival style in 1883, and the architect was Richard Norman Shaw.
