= Pelham Crescent, London =

Coordinates: 51.4930°N 0.1709°W

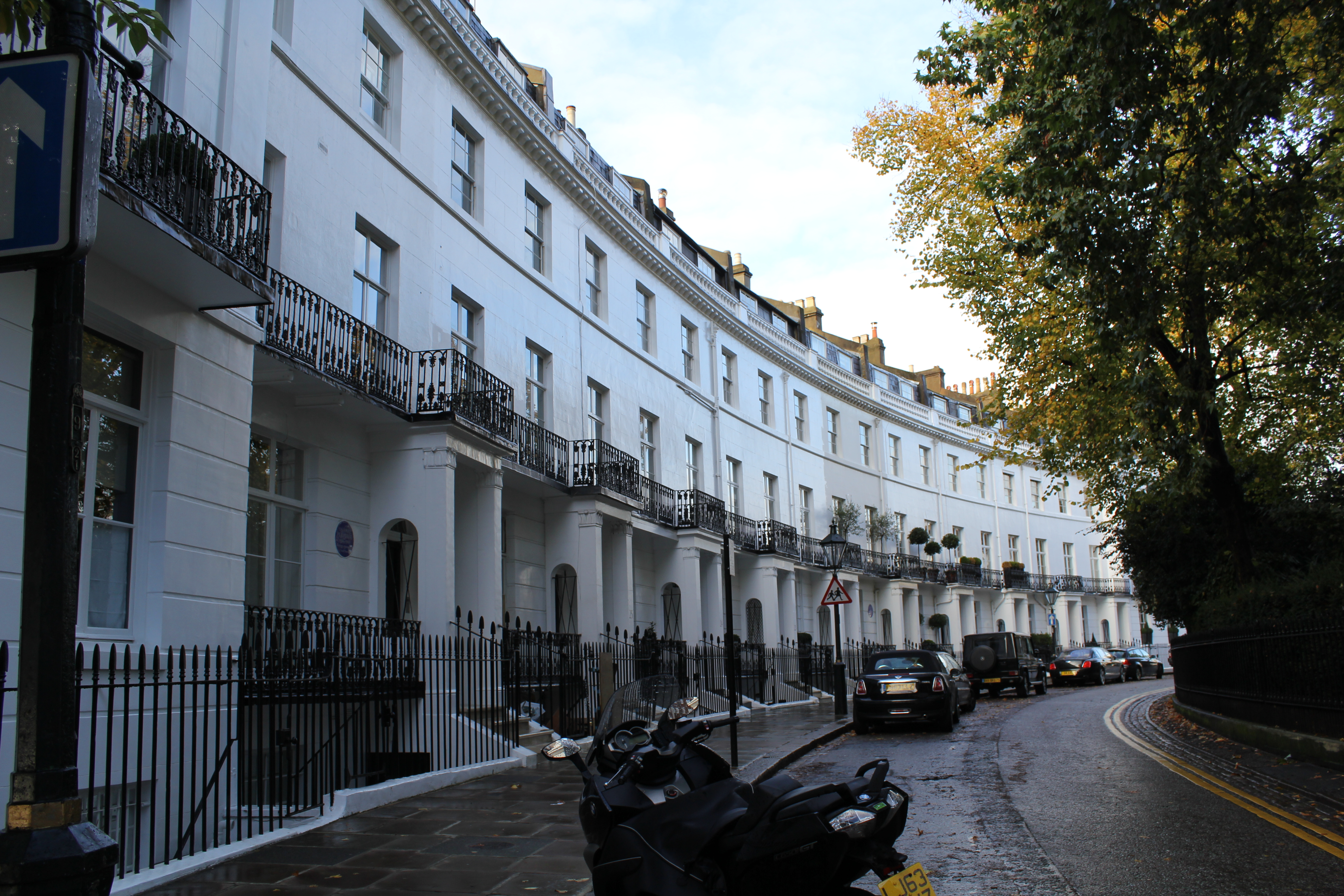
15-27 Pelham Crescent in 2013

Pelham Crescent is a circa 1825 Georgian crescent of houses in South Kensington, London SW7, England, designed by architect George Basevi. Numbers 1–14 and 15–27 are separately Grade II* listed.

The private communal gardens in the centre of Pelham Crescent are 0.4345 hectares (1.074 acres) in size. The selling of garden keys to the residents of Pelham Crescent funds the maintenance of the garden. The lessees of 1-27 Pelham Crescent and 1-29 and 2-18 Pelham Place had access to the gardens as a right of their leases until the leases expirations in 1932. The freehold of the garden is owned by the Smith's Charity Estate (now owned by the Wellcome Trust).

The average value of a house on the mews was £7.3 million in 2020.

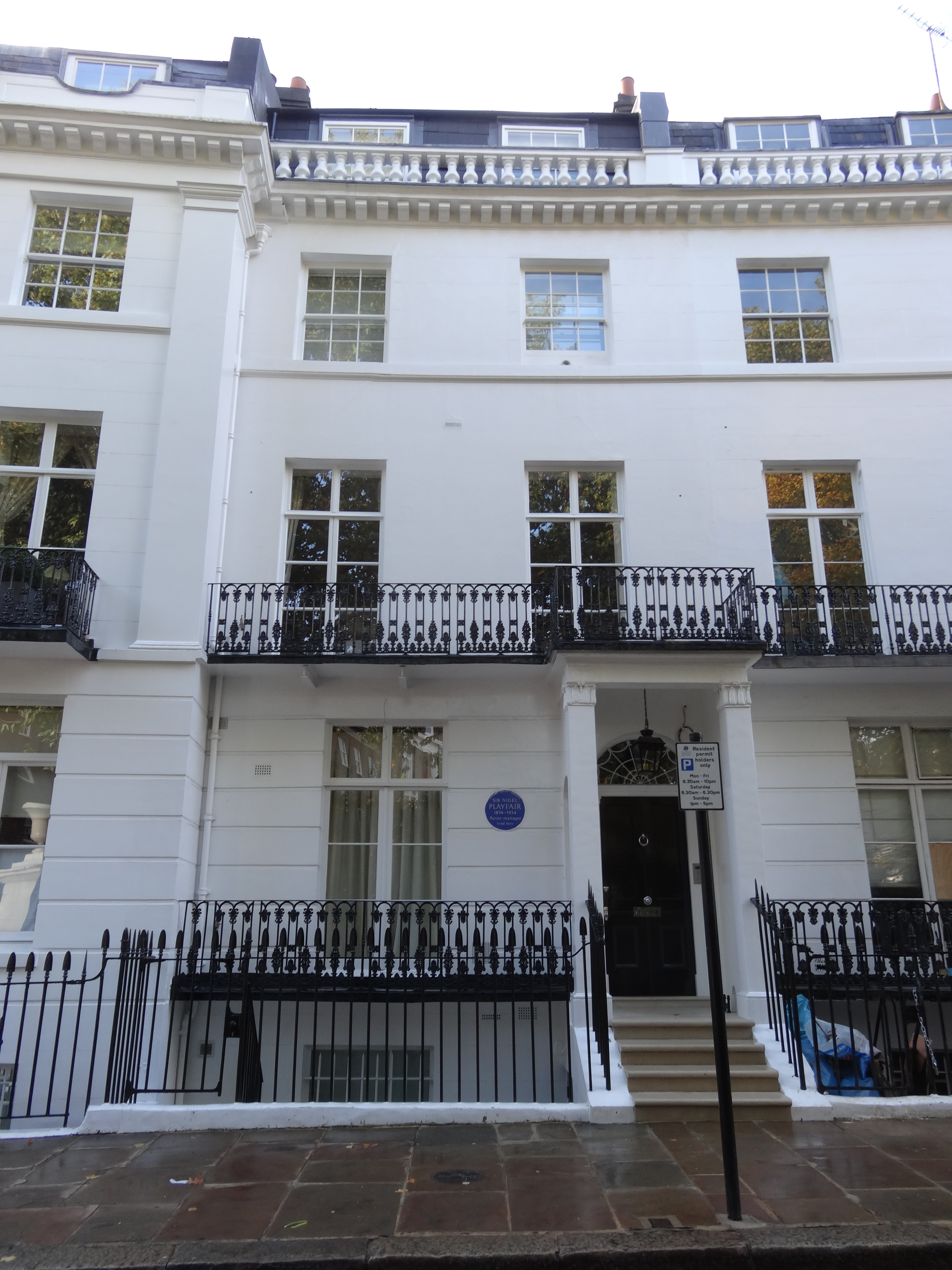
No 21., the former home of Nigel Playfair, in 2013

Actor-manager Nigel Playfair's former residence at No. 26 is marked by a London County Council blue plaque erected in 1965 and Francois Guizot's former home at 21 is commemorated by an English Heritage blue plaque placed in 2001.

== Notable residents ==
- No. 7 — Edward John Trelawny, poet, 1861 to 1881
- No. 10 — Robert and Mary Anne Keeley, actors
- No. 11 — George Godwin the elder, architect
- No. 21 — François Guizot, politician and author
- No. 22 — Moses Margoliouth, Hebrew scholar and Christian convert from Judaism, later Georges d'Oultremont and Baron Jean de Blommaert, Belgian Army officers and resistance organisers in World War II
- No. 25 — Charles James Mathews, actor and impresario from 1865 to 1870
- No. 26 — Nigel Playfair, actor-manager

The publisher Max Reinhardt lived in Pelham Crescent for 25 years.
