= St Luke's Chapel, Brompton Hospital =

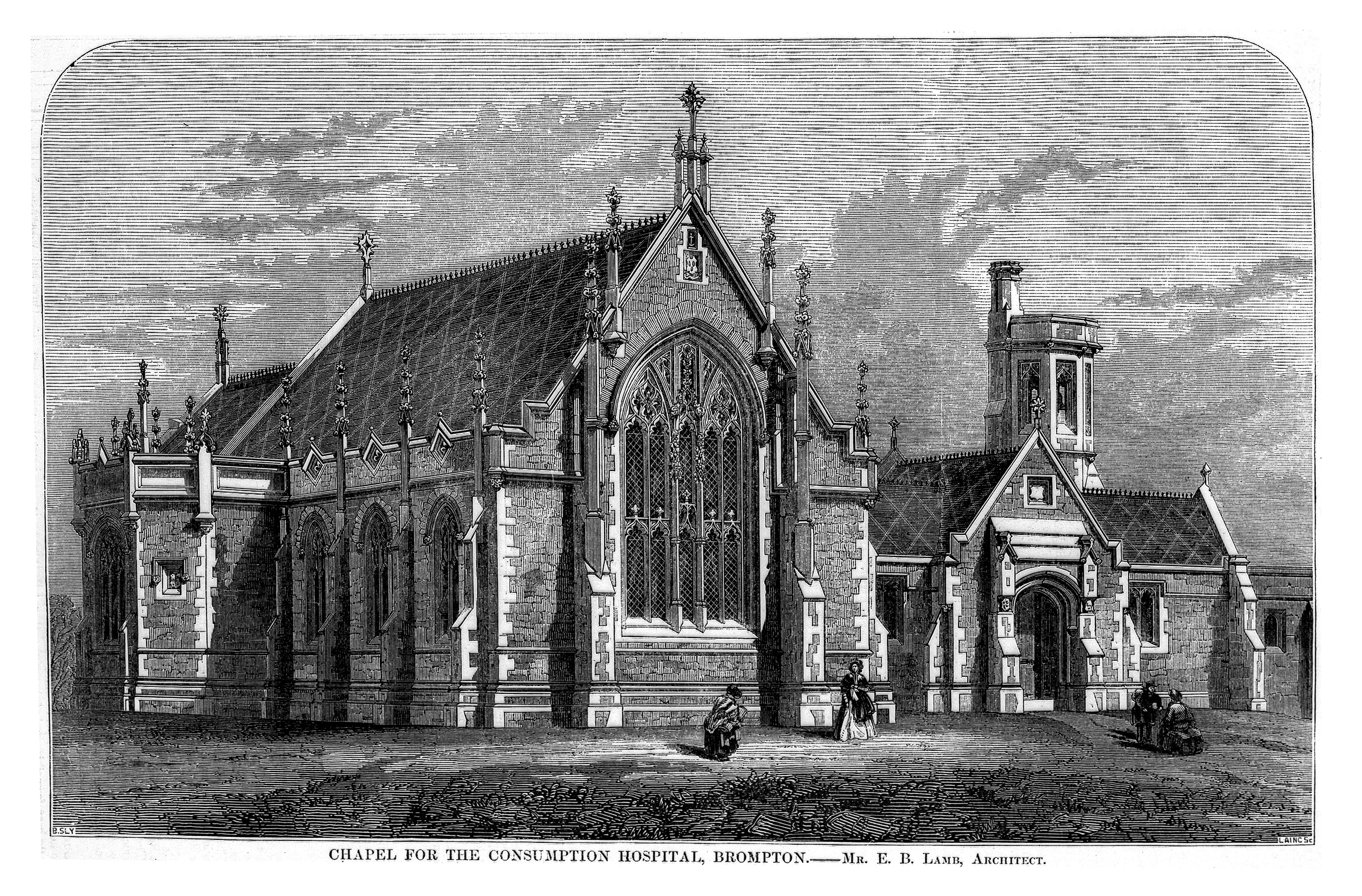
- St Luke's Chapel, Brompton Hospital
- 51.4911°N 0.1748°W
- Location: Fulham Road, Chelsea, London
- Country: England
- Denomination: Church of England

Architecture
- Architect: E. B. Lamb
- Style: Gothic revival
- Years built: 1849

Administration
- Diocese: London
- Archdeaconry: Middlesex
- Deanery: Chelsea

St Luke's Chapel, Brompton Hospital is a Grade II* listed Anglican church in Chelsea, London, England. The chapel was built in 1849, and the architect was E. B. Lamb. It forms part of the Royal Brompton Hospital.
