= 72 Cadogan Square =

Coordinates: 51°29′40″N 0°09′40″W

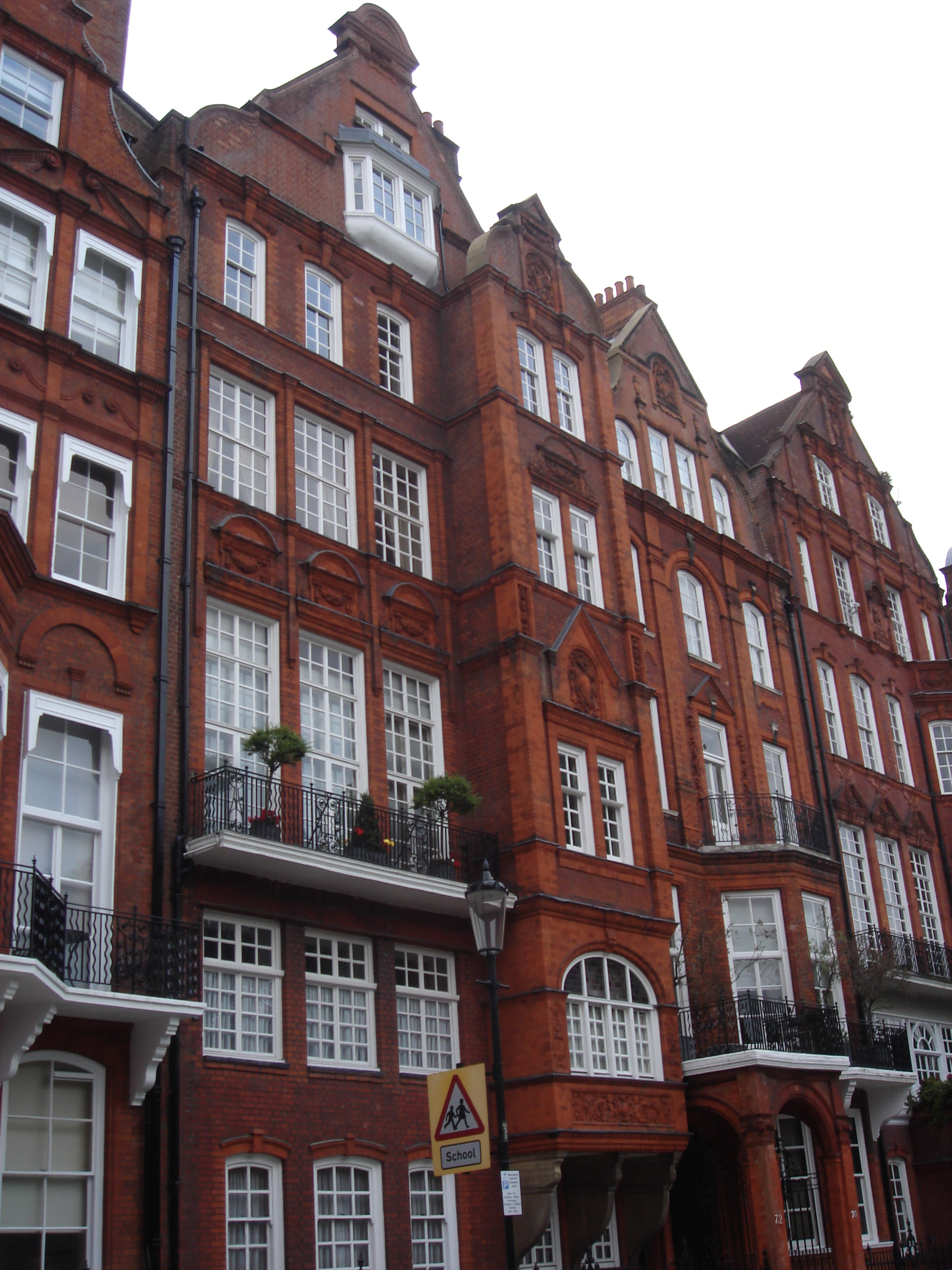
72 Cadogan Square

72 Cadogan Square is a Grade II* listed house in Cadogan Square, London SW1.

The house was built in the British Queen Anne Revival style in 1878, and the architect was Richard Norman Shaw.

A flat in this building was a home for 28 years to American writer Martha Gellhorn. A blue plaque to Gellhorn has been placed at the building.
