= Tomb of Charles Spencer Ricketts =

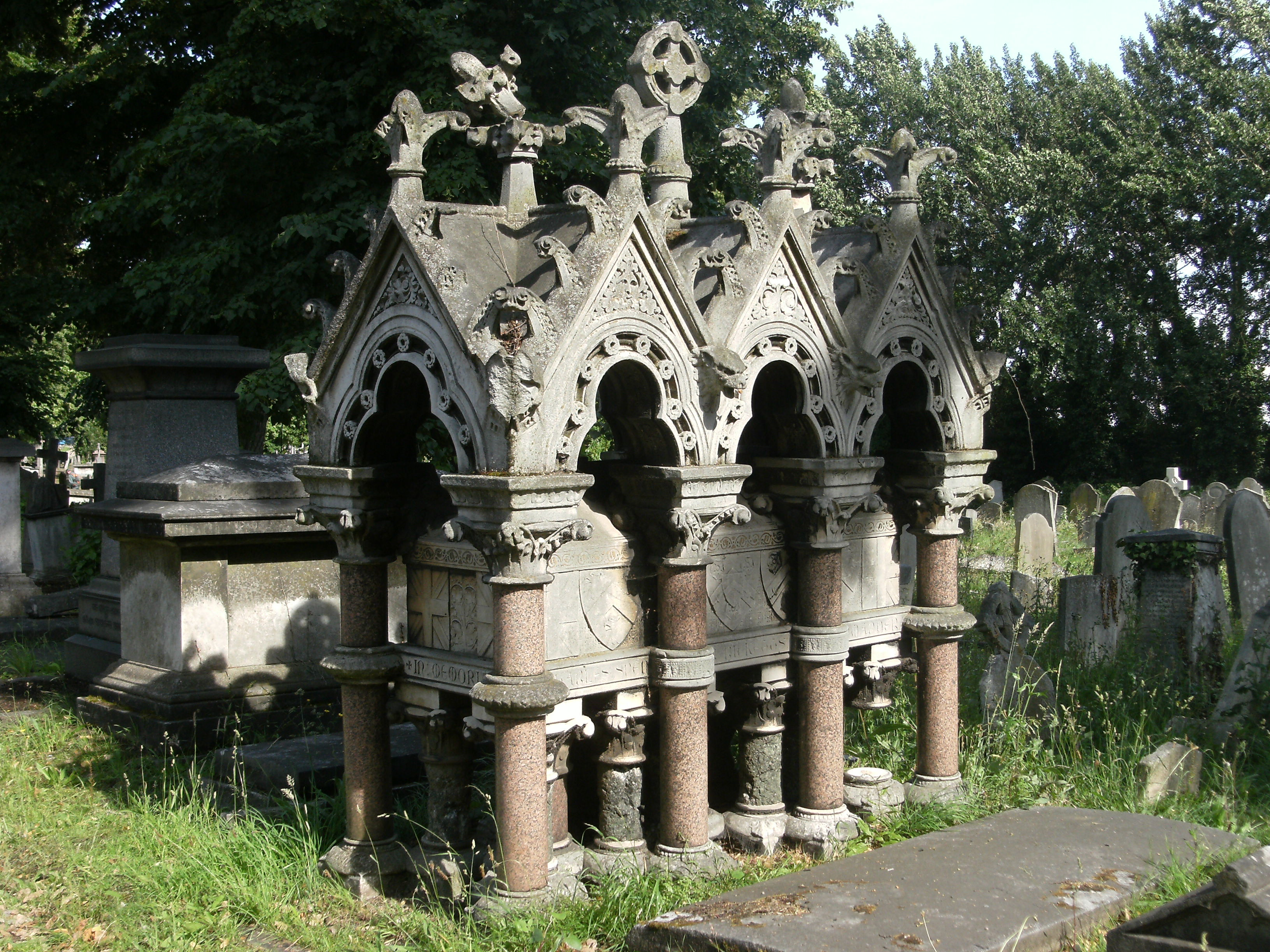
- "A gorgeously rich Gothic shrine"
- Interactive map of the Tomb of Charles Spencer Ricketts area

General information
- Type: Funerary monument
- Architectural style: Gothic Revival
- Location: Kensal Green Cemetery, Royal Borough of Kensington and Chelsea, London
- Coordinates: 51.5282°N 0.2215°W
- Construction started: 1867
- Governing body: General Cemetery Company

Listed Building – Grade II*
- Official name: Tomb of Commander Charles Spencer Ricketts, Royal Navy
- Designated: 7 November 1984
- Reference no.: 1080630

Design and construction
- Architect: William Burges

The Tomb of Charles Spencer Ricketts is located in Kensal Green Cemetery in the Royal Borough of Kensington and Chelsea, London, England. It commemorates Commander Charles Spencer Ricketts, an officer in the Royal Navy. Designed in 1868 by William Burges, the tomb is a Grade II* listed structure.

== History ==
Charles Spencer Ricketts (1788–1867) had entered the Royal Navy at the age of seven. Serving under Thomas Cochrane, "Le Loup de Mer", during the Napoleonic Wars, he retired aged 26 on marrying an heiress, (Note: Ricketts's wife was Elizabeth Sophia Aubrey, niece and heiress to Sir John Aubrey, 6th Baronet, of Dorton House, Buckinghamshire.) and established himself as a country squire at Dorton House, Buckinghamshire, rising to the post of High Sheriff in 1832. (Note: In addition to engaging in county politics, Ricketts's other interests were the maintenance of Royal Naval traditions, and the attempted establishment of a commercial spa on his Buckinghamshire property. He wrote several books on naval discipline, arguing particularly for the continuance of flogging. He also undertook the development of Dorton Spa but this did not prove successful.) The marriage was not happy, and he spent his last years at the London home of his daughter, Julia, who had married a solicitor, George Bonnor. On Ricketts's death in 1867, Julia Bonnor commissioned William Burges to design her father's tomb. Burges's diaries for 1867–68 include two references to "Bonnor's tomb" and the structure was complete by the end of 1868. The condition of the tomb deteriorated in the 20th century, but in the 21st it has been the subject of renovation and preservation.

== Architecture and description ==
The tomb takes the form of a bier, resting on fifteen pedestals, twelve on the edges, and three running down the centre of the sarcophagus. This is surmounted by a stone canopy, itself supported on eight colonettes. The canopy roof has eight gables, each topped by crockets, and with eight gargoyle waterspouts. The outer colonettes are carved from Peterhead granite, the inner columns from Cornish serpentine marble. The latter has not worn well. The rest of the structure is carved Portland stone.

Architectural critics have generally viewed the tomb with dismay. Nikolaus Pevsner, in his early volume, London II, in the Buildings of England series, described it as being "atrociously rich", while remaining unaware of its designer. The revised Pevsner, London 3: North West, updated by Bridget Cherry, tempers the earlier criticism, calling the structure a "gorgeously rich Gothic shrine". Burges's biographer, J. Mordaunt Crook, in his study, William Burges and the High Victorian Dream, writes, "hunched like a porcupine, fattened to the point of obesity, its reptilian form is almost a parody of Early French". The tomb's reputation has subsequently risen with that of its designer; Richard Barnes, in his study The Art of Memory: Sculpture in the Cemeteries of London, assesses it as “one of the greatest High Victorian memorials in the country”. The tomb is a Grade II* listed structure.

== Sources ==
- Barnes, Richard (2016). The Art of Memory: Sculpture in the Cemeteries of London. London: Kirstead Frontier. OCLC 959686527.
- Cherry, Bridget; Pevsner, Nikolaus (2002). London 3: North West. The Buildings of England. Newhaven, US and London: Yale University Press. ISBN 978-0-300-09652-1. OCLC 844442257.
- Crook, J. Mordaunt (2013). William Burges and the High Victorian Dream. London: Frances Lincoln. ISBN 978-0-711-23349-2. OCLC 1019987074.
- Pevsner, Nikolaus (1952). London II: except the Cities of London and Westminster. The Buildings of England. London: Penguin Books. OCLC 490048007.
