= 4 Cheyne Walk =

House in Chelsea, London, England

Coordinates: 51°29′03″N 0°09′52″W

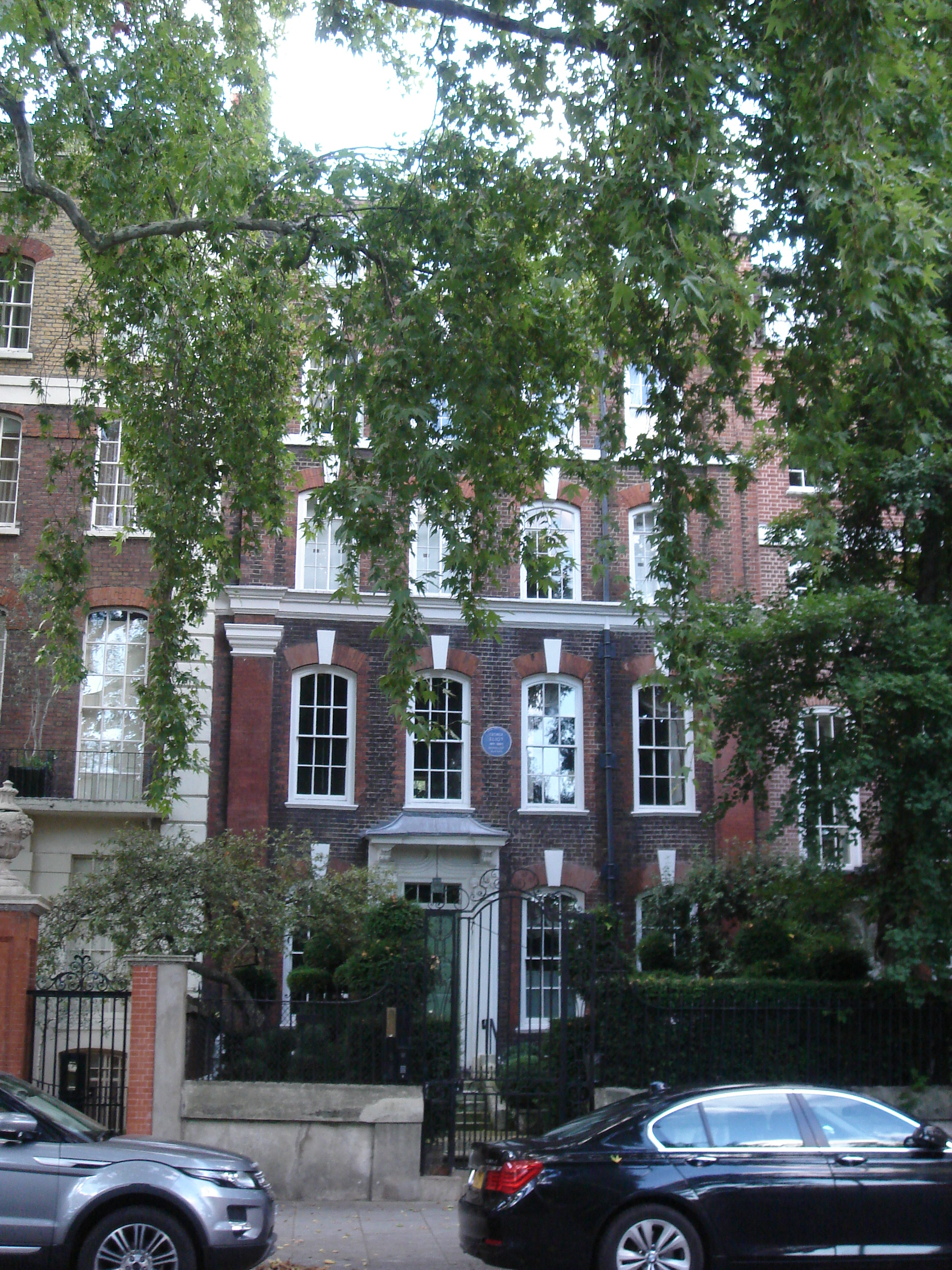
4 Cheyne Walk in 2013

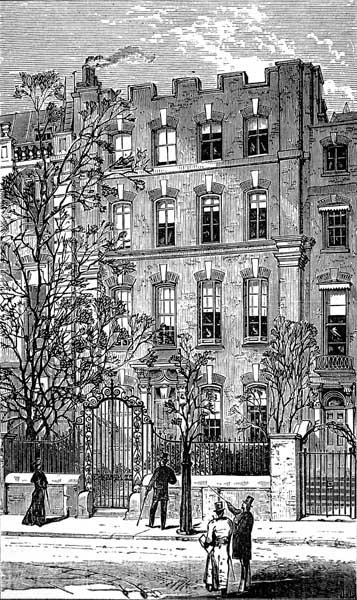
4 Cheyne Walk in 1881

4 Cheyne Walk is a Grade II* listed house on Cheyne Walk, Chelsea, London, built in 1718 and architecturally in the Queen Anne style. There is a blue plaque noting that the novelist George Eliot lived there until her death. In 2015, it was acquired by former New York City mayor Michael Bloomberg.

== History ==
It was most probably designed for its first owner, William Morrison.

According to Walter Godfrey's 1909 Survey of London, it was built with greater care and expense than 1 to 3 Cheyne Walk (built about the same time). The house can be dated to 1718, because of the date 1718 on the lead head to the rainwater pipe. This pipe was formerly at the back of the house, and is now at the front of the house. The red brick facade was almost identical to 1718, except that a third storey was added, and "battlements" now exist upon the parapet. However, the house has had certain modifications to the interior.

== Notable inhabitants ==
In 1851, the organist, composer and teacher Sir John Goss was living there with his wife, five children, sister-in-law and two servants.

Subsequent occupants included the Scottish artist and educator William Dyce (1806–1864) and the Irish artist Daniel Maclise (1806–1870), who was a friend of Charles Dickens.

The antiquary William Sandys Wright Vaux (1818–1885), President of the Society of Antiquaries, Keeper of Coins and Medals at the British Museum, Secretary to the Royal Asiatic Society, and President of the Numismatic Society, lived there until 1880.

The house was then occupied by the novelist George Eliot, who lived there until her death in 1880. Together with her new husband, John Cross, they leased it in the spring 1880, commissioning a "Mr Armitage of Manchester" to supervise the redecoration and furnishing. However, they did not move in until 3 December, and Eliot died on 22 December 1880. Although she only lived there for 19 days, it is still considered to be her London home, and she has been honoured with a blue plaque, rather than any of the other notable inhabitants.

In 1909, the house was occupied by Ernest Louis Meinertzhagen JP, who was a long-time member of the London County Council.

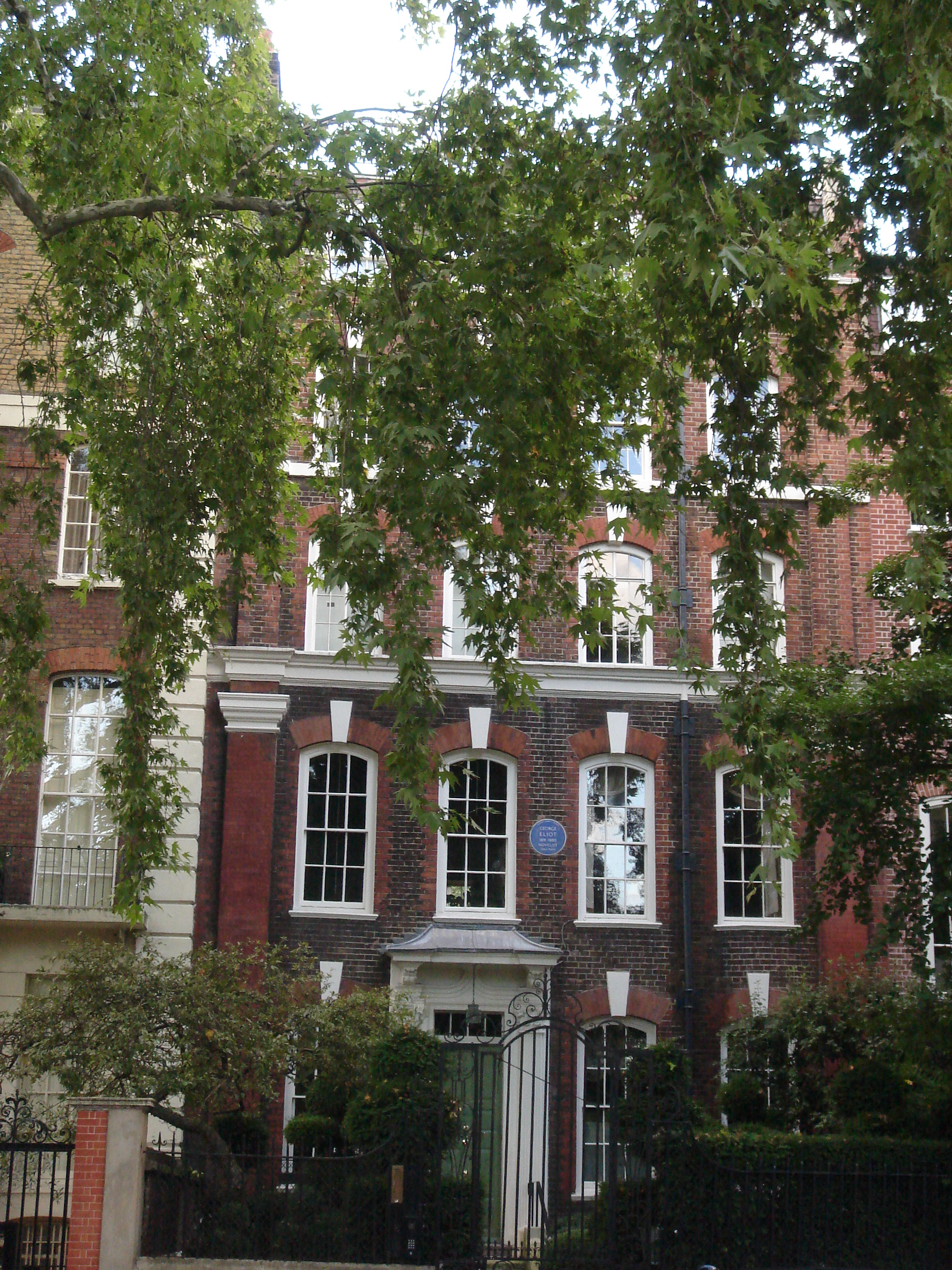
4 Cheyne Walk

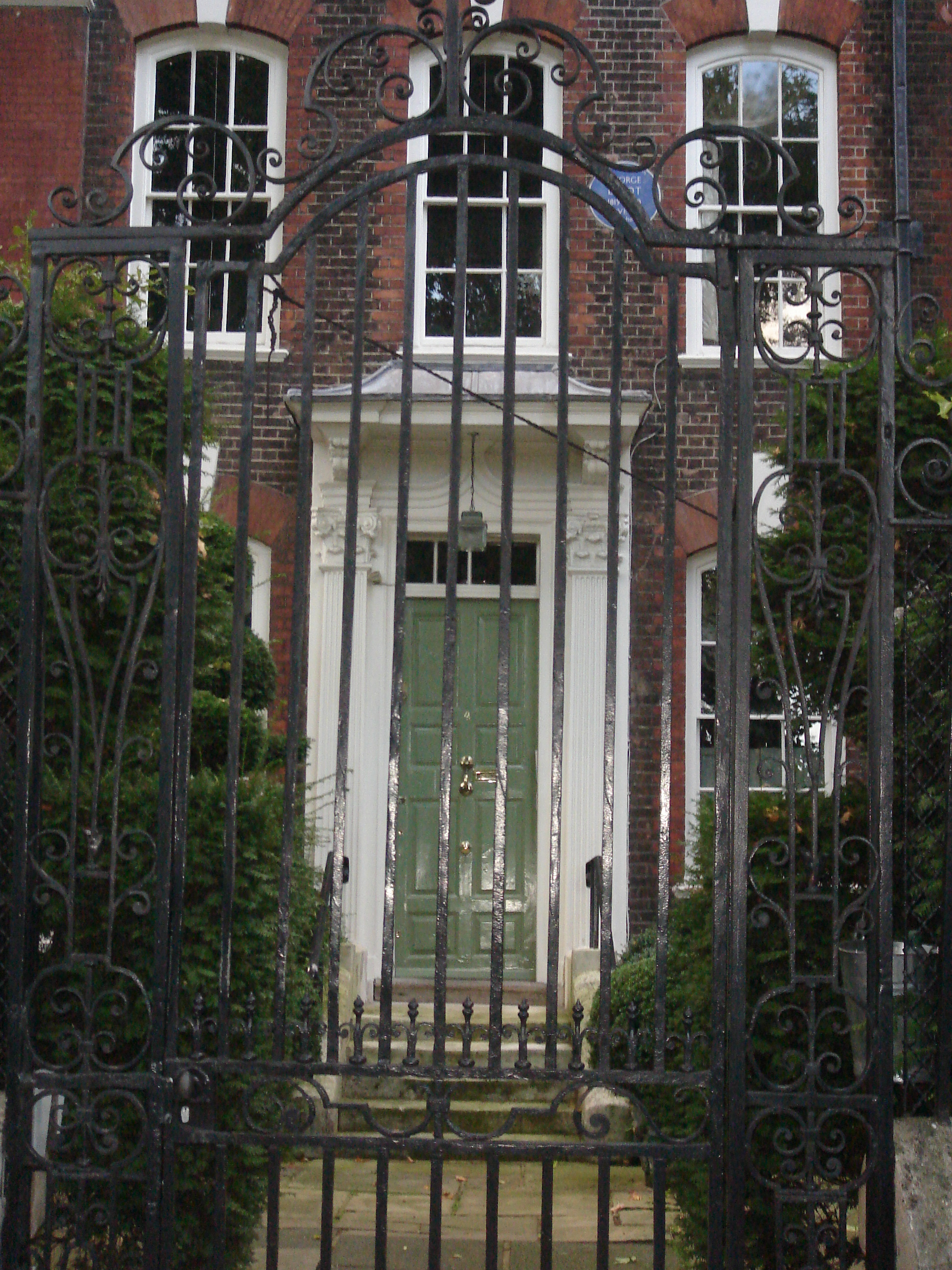
4 Cheyne Walk

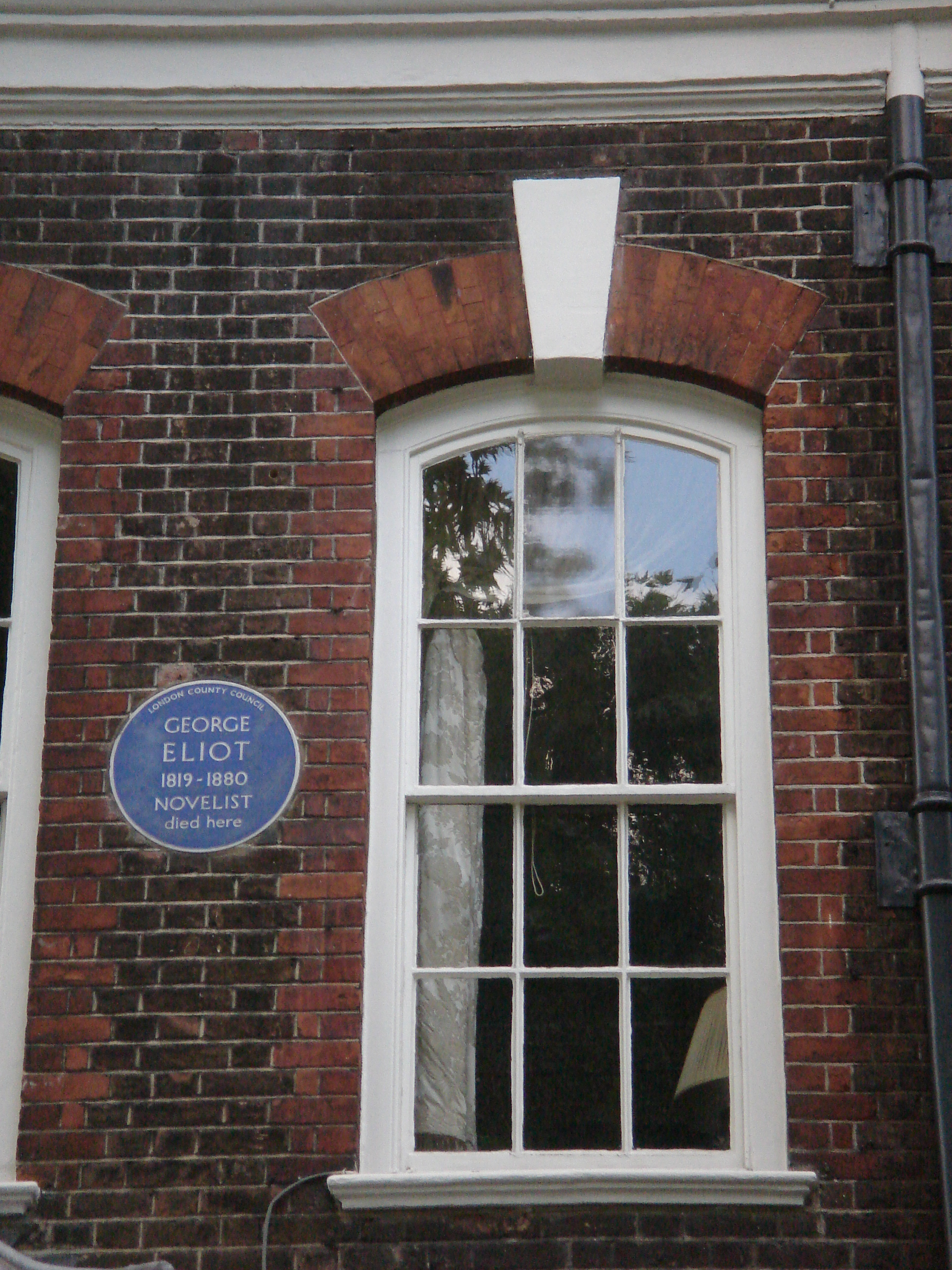
4 Cheyne Walk

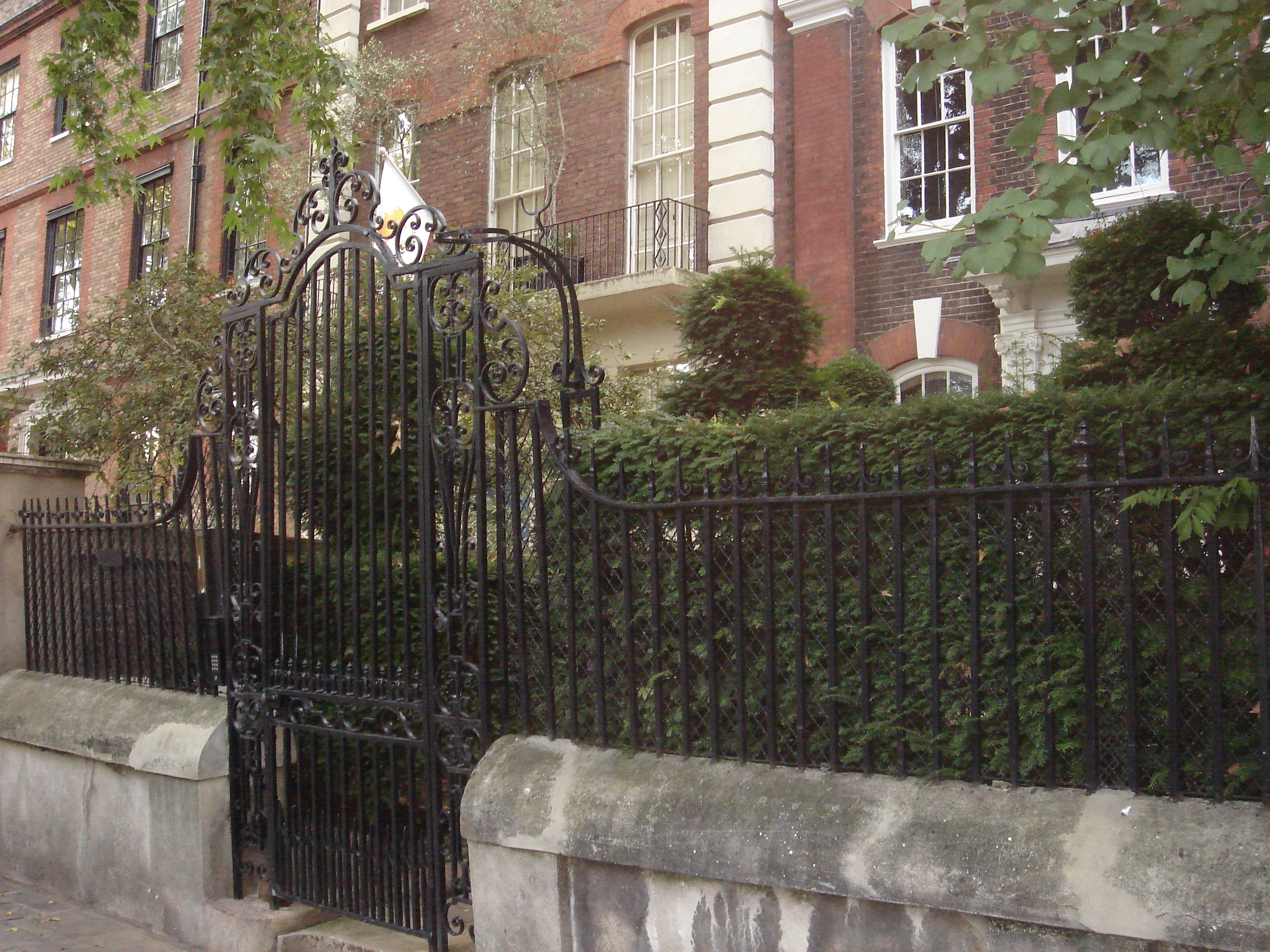
4 Cheyne Walk

== See also ==
- 6 Cheyne Walk
