= Argyll House, Chelsea =

Argyll House (Chelsea)
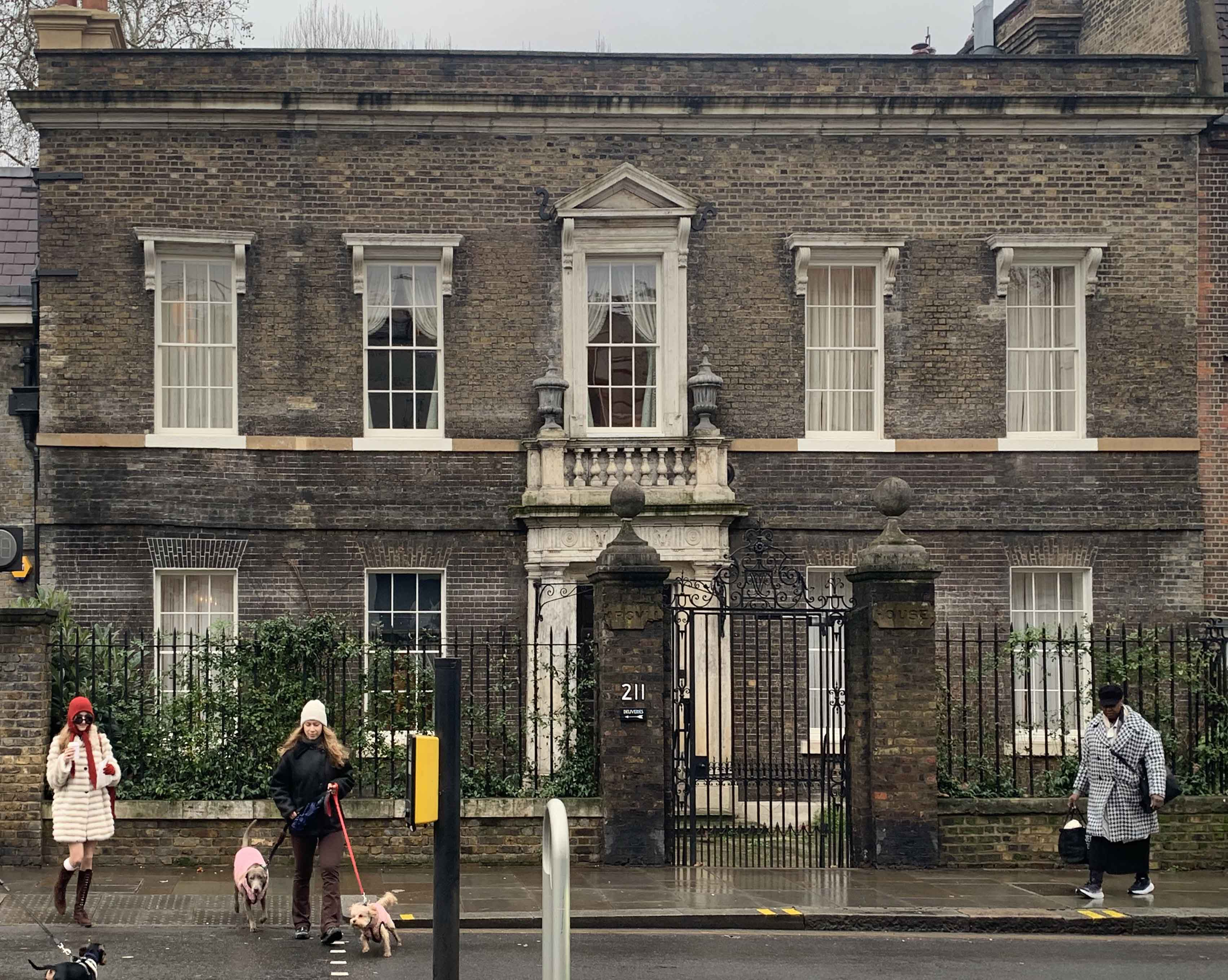
- Argyll House in January 2026
- Interactive map of the Argyll House (Chelsea) area
- Alternative names: Argyle House

General information
- Type: House
- Architectural style: Palladian architecture
- Location: Chelsea, 211 King's Rd, London, England
- Coordinates: 51°29′12″N 0°10′13″W
- Completed: 1723

Technical details
- Structural system: Brick, timber

Design and construction
- Architect: Giacomo Leoni

References
- Listed Grade II

Argyll House is a historic building in Chelsea, London. It is named after John Campbell, 4th Duke of Argyll, who lived there during the last two years of his life from 1769 to 1770. The house was built in the early 18th century and is located at the corner of the King's Road and Oakley Street. It is a Grade II* Listed building, owing to its historic significance and Palladian dimensions, designed by Giacomo Leoni. It was built in 1723 soon after Londoners had successfully petitioned the King to allow them to use what had previously been his private road. Argyll House is located next door to a number of other listed buildings including 213 and 215 King's Road and 217 King's Road. It is believed that Wallis Simpson was first introduced to the future King Edward VIII at Argyll House in 1935.

== History ==
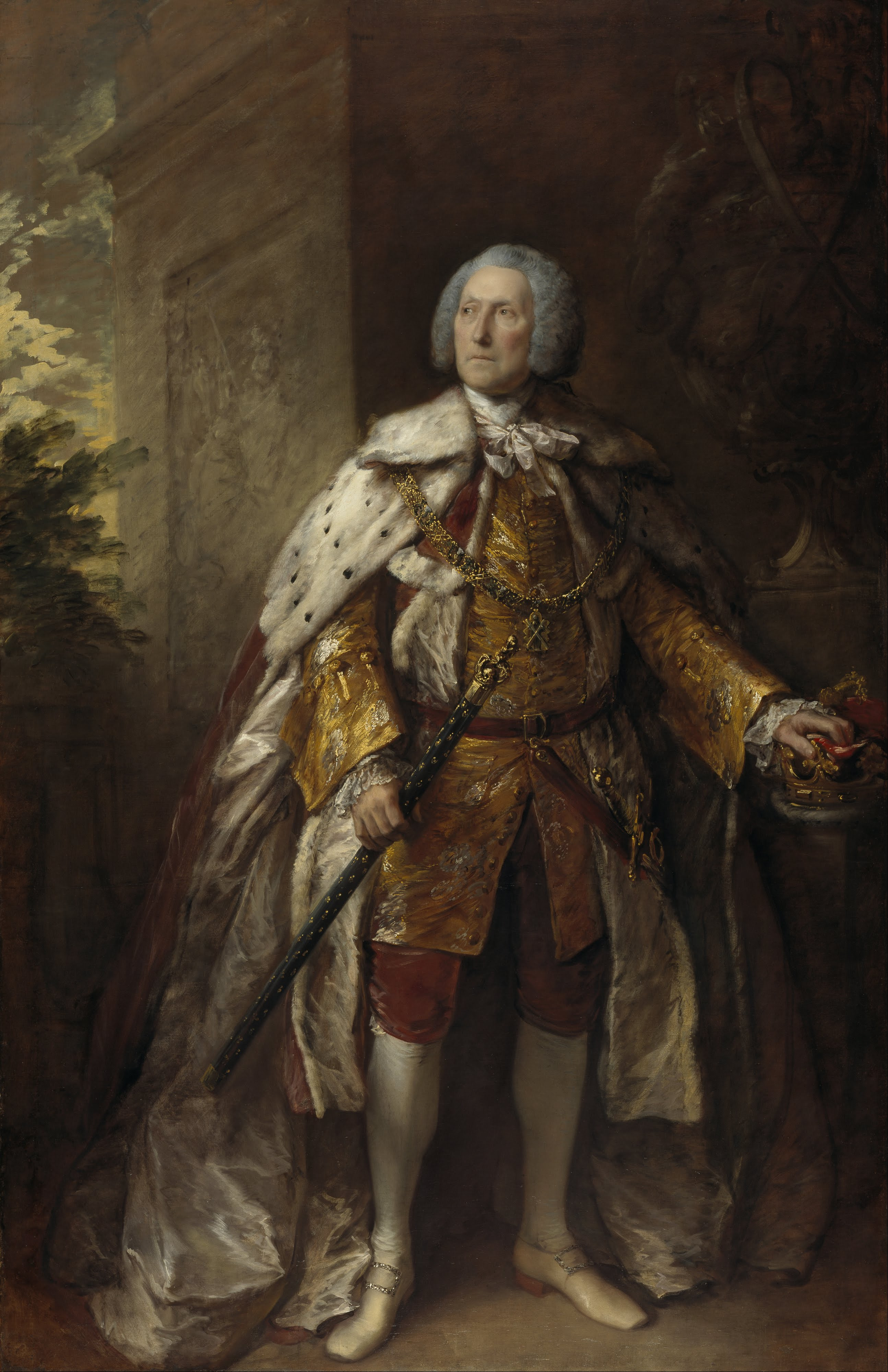
John Campbell, 4th Duke of Argyll (c.1693 - 1770) by Thomas Gainsborough

Argyll House was designed by the Venetian architect Giacomo Leoni. It was built in 1723 on the corner of Kings' Road and Oakley Street. The house takes its name from John Campbell, 4th Duke of Argyll, who lived there during the last two years of his life from 1769 to 1770.

Argyll House was at the centre of London society in the early twentieth century, when it was owned by Arthur Colefax and his wife Lady Sybil Colefax, a socialite and interior designer. Argyll House Guests at this time included Fred Astaire, George Gershwin, Noël Coward, Virginia Woolf and Winston Churchill. It is believed that Ernest Simpson and Wallis Simpson were first introduced to the Prince of Wales, the future King Edward VIII, at Argyll House in 1935.

As of September 2018 the house is owned by the family of the Fifth Marquis of Normanby.

== Significance ==
John Summerson, speaking to the Chelsea Society in 1949, called it, "Chelsea's most Palladian building." Argyll House was listed Grade II* on 24 June 1954.

== See also ==
- 213 and 215 King's Road
- 217 King's Road
- World's End, Chelsea
