= Keith Irvine =

Scottish-American interior designer (1928–2011)

Keith Briscoe Irvine (14 October 1928, Aberdeen, Scotland – 31 May 2011, Carmel, New York) was an American-based interior designer of Scottish descent.

He trained at the Kingston Art School, then did his military service in the Seaforth Highlanders in Malaysia during the Malayan Emergency. He then graduated from The Royal College of Art, London, England in 1955. After graduating he wrote to John Fowler of Colefax & Fowler, writing " You are the only person in the world I want to work for". John Fowler said to him " What have you been doing at that college for three years? You know nothing!". Three weeks later, Imogene Taylor of Colefax & Fowler called to offer him a position. His first celebrity job was an apartment in Eaton Square for Sir Laurence Olivier and Vivian Leigh, as well as working on their country house. After a couple of years of working with John Fowler and Nancy Lancaster, he realized that he was never going to climb any higher at Colefax & Fowler.

John Fowler " lent" Irvine out to Mrs. Henry Parish II for a job in Johannesburg, who, when the job was finished, offered Keith a job in New York and $40.00 a week. In 1957 he travelled to New York. Nine months later, he left to start his own firm.

When Irvine first arrived in New York he had searched for an apartment share in the New York Times, and ended up meeting Robin Roberts . Before things could really settle Keith had a partner and firm, Roberts & Irvine . Finding it difficult to find the French and English fabrics that were a staple in Keith Irvine's decorating style, Roberts and Irvine created the fabric house Clarence House. Tom Fleming became an assistant as the business took off. Before the year was out the firm split ( Keith claimed that with the influx of "top drawer" clients, Roberts had become a "liability" as he didn't "move readily in 'polite society'", Roberts took Clarence House, and Keith left to start Keith Irvine & Co. Tom Fleming stayed on with him and became a partner on 1 January 1967 and Irvine & Fleming was born. Many successful designers started their careers as Irvine's assistant, such as Tom Fleming, Mario Buatta, Sam Blount, Gary Zarr, Richard Keith Langham, Greg Jordan, Edwin Jackson, and Jason Bell.

Keith Irvine's celebrity clients included Leonard Bernstein, William F. Buckley Jr., Cary Grant, Rex Harrison, Vivien Leigh, Laurence Olivier, Jacqueline Kennedy Onassis, Ted Kennedy, Jerome Robbins, Diana Ross, Alfred Gwynne Vanderbilt Jr., and Wallis, Duchess of Windsor, and many more.

Keith Irvine died on 31 May 2011, and was survived by his wife, author and former fashion designer, Chippy Irvine; his daughters, and a grandchild.
