= Colefax =

Colefax may refer to:

- Colefax Group plc, a designer and distributor of furnishing fabrics and wallpaper based in London
- Arthur Colefax, Sir, (1866–1936), British patent lawyer and politician
- Sibyl Colefax, Lady (née Halsey; 1874–1950), English interior decorator and socialite
