= Daylesford House =

Country house near Daylesford, England

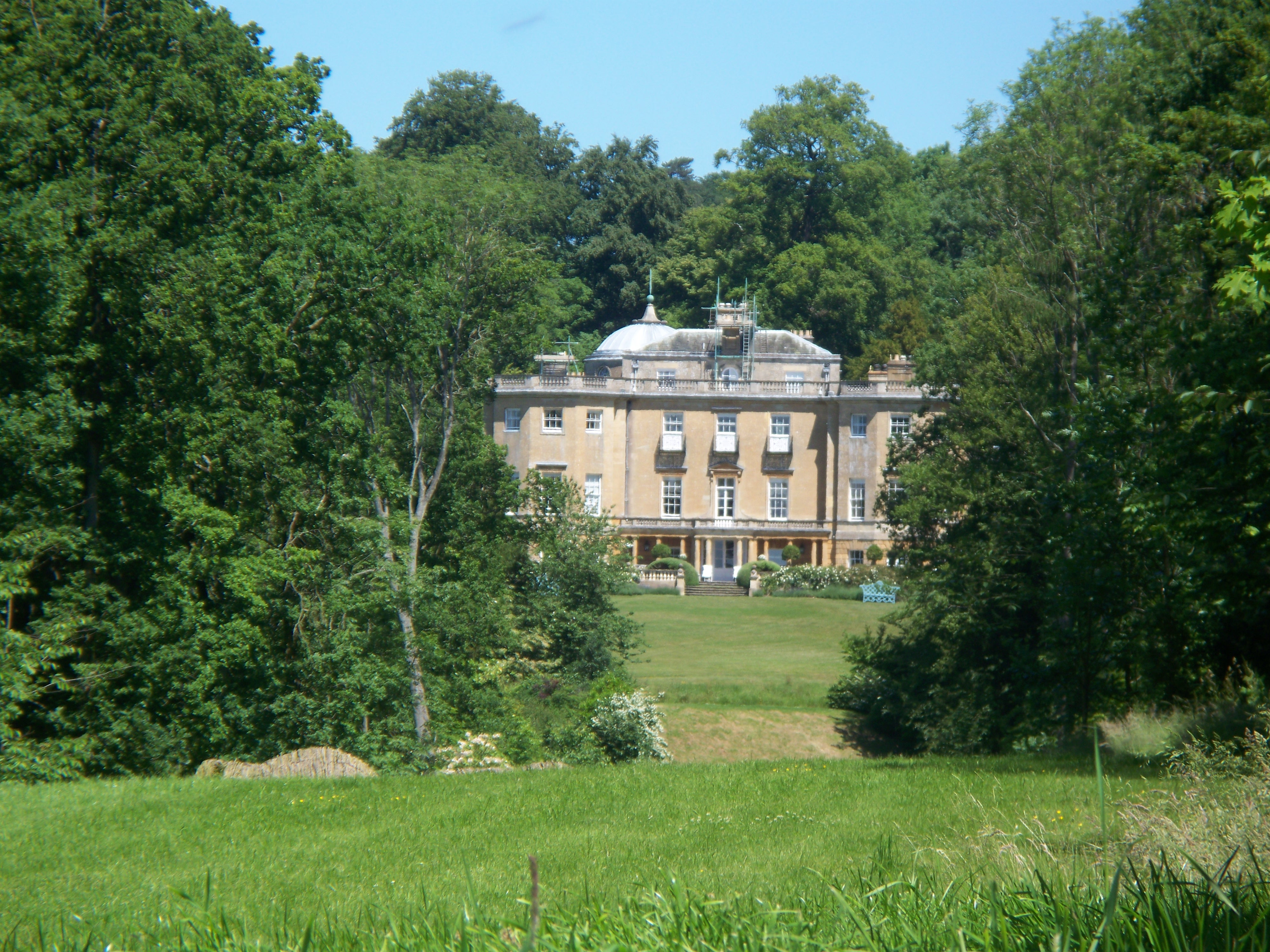
- Daylesford House

- Location in Gloucestershire
- 51°56′10″N 01°37′54″W
- Location: Daylesford, Gloucestershire, England

Daylesford House is a Georgian country house near Daylesford, Gloucestershire, England, on the north bank of the River Evenlode near the border with Oxfordshire, 5 miles (8.0 km) east of Stow-on-the-Wold and 5 miles (8.0 km) west of Chipping Norton. The village of Daylesford lies nearby to the west, Adlestrop to the north, Cornwell to the east, and Kingham to the south,

The house has been listed Grade I on the National Heritage List for England since 1960, and its gardens were subsequently Grade II* listed on the Register of Historic Parks and Gardens in 1986. The grounds include an orangery in late 18th century Gothic style, which has a separate Grade I listing. The stable block and ice house in the grounds are also separately Grade II listed.

== History ==
The former manor house of Daylesford was acquired in 1788 by Warren Hastings, former Governor-General of India, along with an estate of 650 acres (260 ha), for £54,000. It became the family home where he lived with his wife and stepson. Warren Hastings was descended from the Hastings family that had owned the manor from the 12th to 14th century, and then again from the 15th century until it was sold in 1715 by Hastings's grandfather to a merchant from Bristol, Jacob Knight. Knight began the construction of a new house in about 1730, but the new house remained unfinished when both Knight and his eldest son John died in 1788. Hastings had previously offered twice the value of the land to get the house back, and he finally acquired the estate in 1788 from a younger son Thomas Knight.

The shell was remodelled by Hastings from around 1788 to 1793 to designs by Samuel Pepys Cockerell, architect to the East India Company, to create a broadly Neoclassical house with some features inspired by Indian architectural styles. Cockerell took the Indian motifs further at Sezincote House, built for his brother Sir Charles Cockerell nearby.

After his death in 1818, Hastings was buried at St Peter's church in Daylesford nearby, and his widow Marian Hastings died there in 1837, and then by her son (Hastings' stepson) Sir Charles Imhoff until he sold it in 1853 to stockbroker Harman Grisewood. During Grisewood's period of ownership, alterations were made to the interiors and exteriors by Robert Trollope. After Grisewood's death in 1874, the house was acquired by R. Nichol Byass, and then it was sold in 1884 to Charles Edward Baring Young.

Daylesford House was occupied by US soldiers in the Second World War and left in a dilapidated state. The house and estate were acquired by Esmond Harmsworth, 2nd Viscount Rothermere in 1946. He restored the house with the help of the architect Philip Jebb and the interior decorator John Beresford Fowler. It was subsequently acquired by Hans Heinrich Thyssen-Bornemisza, Baron Thyssen-Bornemisza de Kászon for £600,000 in the late 1970s. Thyssen hired the Italian designer Lorenzo Mongiardino to redecorate the interior at a cost almost equal to the purchase price of the house. Thyssen subsequently estimated that he had spent £3 million on Daylesford, having renovated houses on the estate and increased the surrounding landholding to 12,000 acres. Thyssen described the expenditure as "...endless, and the weather was appalling, so we only went in the winter so at least we knew what to expect". It was sold in 1986 to Sir Anthony Bamford. Bamford is a major financial donor to the Conservative Party and in July 2022 hosted the wedding celebrations of the then prime minister Boris Johnson and his wife Carrie at the house. Daylesford remains a private home and is not open to the public. Its gardens are occasionally opened under the National Garden Scheme.

== House ==
The exterior of the house exhibits a plain style of Neoclassicism, based on Palladio, with some fussy French details. The house has an "H" plan, with a central block of three stories, and wings of two stories, constructed from yellowish Stanway limestone ashlars.

The south front was originally the main entrance, with canted bays at either end, reached by a drive that swept past the main west front. The main front was originally to the west, at the centre of which is a projecting semicircular bay, with four Ionic pillars and French Neoclassical garland swags around the architrave, topped by a shallow dome with pointed Coade stone finial, and wings projecting to either side. The oriental-inspired dome predates the publication of architectural aquatints of Thomas Daniell and William Daniell in 1796, and the domes of Sezincote and Brighton Pavilion. The main entrance was moved to the east front in the 19th century, with the addition of a late 19th century extension with projecting Tuscan porch and portico, and a flat roof.

The interior is decorated in a plain Classical style, with two fireplaces by Thomas Banks and one by John Bacon with Indian motifs. Hasting's original decoration scheme made frequent use of gold and crimson, and displayed his collection of oriental-style furniture. The main rooms face south and west, with views downhill over the park, and the services are located on the wood-shrouded northern side. A circular boudoir in the dome, facing west, was the main state bedroom, has a high domed ceiling, and a segmental bay.

A curved stable block is located near the house. The house has been listed Grade I on the National Heritage List for England since 1960.

== Gardens ==
Hastings also laid out the gardens and grounds, which were landscaped by John Davenport. To the west of the house is a lawn with views across a ha-ha to the park, and there are terraces to the south and east. The main formal approach was from Daylesford village to the south-west, through a park of approximately 120 hectares (300 acres), with many mature trees and areas of woodland, two lakes (one of which has an island, formerly the site of a decorative temple), and a walled kitchen garden. A garden of approximately 10 hectares (25 acres) surrounds the house, with mainly 19th century planting. Some of the stonework in the grounds may be derived from the Grey Geese of Adlestrop, a collection of stones (possibly a Neolithic monument) found on the top of Adelstrop Hill nearby. The gardens are listed at Grade II* listed on the Register of Historic Parks and Gardens in 1986. A stable block and icehouse in the grounds have separate Grade II listings.

=== Orangery ===
About 200 metres (660 ft) east of the house is an orangery which was constructed in 1789–90. Sources offer contradictory suggestions as to the architect. David Verey and Alan Brooks, in their Gloucestershire I: The Cotswolds volume in the Pevsner Buildings of England series, revised and reissued in 2000, suggest John Davenport. Historic England's listing for the house's park and garden follows this, suggesting that the attribution to Davenport is "almost certain[..]". The Historic England listing record for the orangery, however, makes no mention of Davenport, and suggests it is "probably" by Cockerell. (Note: The Historic England listing also records the orangery as dating from the early and late 19th century, but other sources date it to the end of the 18th.) In Gothick style, the seven-bay building is constructed from ashlars, with tall pointed windows facing south over the park, a pediment above the central three bays, round wings at either end, and battlements with pinnacles. Many details are based on the pattern books of Batty Langley.

== Sources ==
- Christie, Christopher (2000). The British Country House in the Eighteenth Century. Manchester University Press. ISBN 9780719047251.
- Litchfield, David R.; Schmitz, Caroline (2006). The Thyssen Art Macabre. Quartet Books. ISBN 9780704371194.
- Verey, David; Brooks, Alan (2000) [1970]. Gloucestershire 1: The Cotswolds. The Buildings of England. New Haven, US and London: Yale University Press. ISBN 978-0-140-71098-4. OCLC 633122306.
