= Mario Buatta =

American interior decorator (1935–2018)

Mario Buatta (October 20, 1935 – October 15, 2018) was an American interior decorator.

== Early life and education ==
Buatta was born in West Brighton, Staten Island, New York, the son of Felice Buatta, a violinist and bandleader whose stage name was Phil Burton. He was educated at Curtis High School, briefly studied architecture at Wagner College and Cooper Union, after which he worked as an interior decorator for department stores while taking classes in design at Pratt Institute, Columbia University, and, in the summer of 1961, at the Parsons School of Design in Europe. He later received guidance from English designer John Fowler, who greatly influenced him.

== Career ==
Buatta worked for Elisabeth C. Draper and then for Keith Irvine, and started his own business in 1963. He designed interiors for clients including Mariah Carey, Henry Ford II, Malcolm Forbes, Barbara Walters, Nelson Doubleday, Samuel Irving Newhouse, Sr., Charlotte Ford, and Billy Joel. In 1988, he and Mark Hampton oversaw the interior redecoration of Blair House in Washington, D.C. His most extensive work was Carolands, a 92-room chateau located in Hillsborough, California. In addition to his work for clients, he licensed a wide range of products, including a telephone.

Known as the "Prince of Chintz" for his use of lush floral prints, and also as the "King of Clutter", Buatta was greatly influenced by English interior design, especially the Regency period, and known for rooms that evoked the English country house.

Buatta was unusual in the interior design profession in working almost alone, and described himself as "married to [his] business". He was a mainstay of the Kips Bay Decorator Showhouse and from 1977 to 1991 chaired The Winter Show, greatly increasing its prominence as an antiques and design venue.

== Personal life and death ==
Buatta lived in a townhouse in Manhattan, and also owned the 1845 William H. Mason house in Thompson Hill, Connecticut. The house, listed as part of a historic district by the National Register of Historic Places, fell into disrepair, leading to protests of "demolition by neglect".

He died in New York City on October 15, 2018, at the age of 82.
