= Church of St Peter, Daylesford =

Church in Daylesford, Gloucestershire, England

Coordinates: 51.9309°N 1.6479°W

Church of St Peter
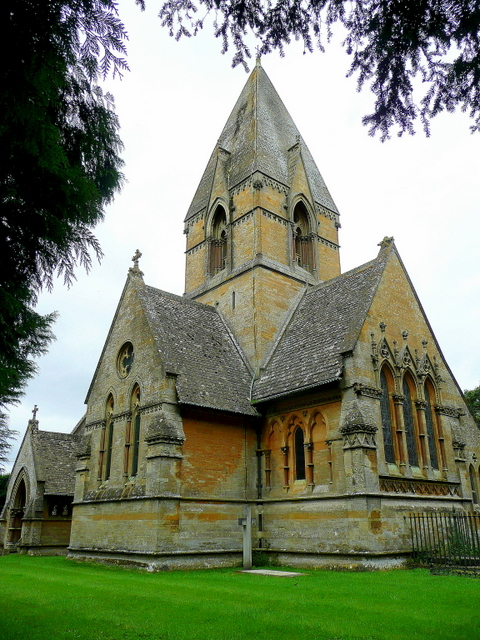

- Denomination: Church of England

Architecture
- Heritage designation: Grade I listed building
- Designated: 25 August 1960

Administration
- Province: Canterbury
- Diocese: Gloucester

The Anglican Church of St Peter at Daylesford in the Cotswold District of Gloucestershire, England, was rebuilt in 1860. It is a grade I listed building.

== History ==
The original church on the site was Norman. The church was rebuilt in 1816 by Warren Hastings who owned the nearby Daylesford House. It was again rebuilt to the designs of J. L. Pearson in 1859–63.

The church is within the benefice of Kingham, Daylesford and Churchill with Sarsden but since 2017 has been owned by the St Peter's, Daylesford Charitable Trust. Occasional services held by both the Church of England and Roman Catholic Church.

It is on the Heritage at risk published by Historic England because of the condition of the roof and sandstone colonnades.

== Architecture ==
The limestone cruciform building has a central unbuttressed tower and stone slate roofs. It consists of a nave, chancel, north and south transepts, and a vestry.

There are metal screens in the transepts. The stained glass includes windows by William Wailes and Clayton and Bell.
