= Sezincote House =

Centre of a country estate in Sezincote, Gloucestershire, England

Coordinates: 51.9775°N 1.7512°W

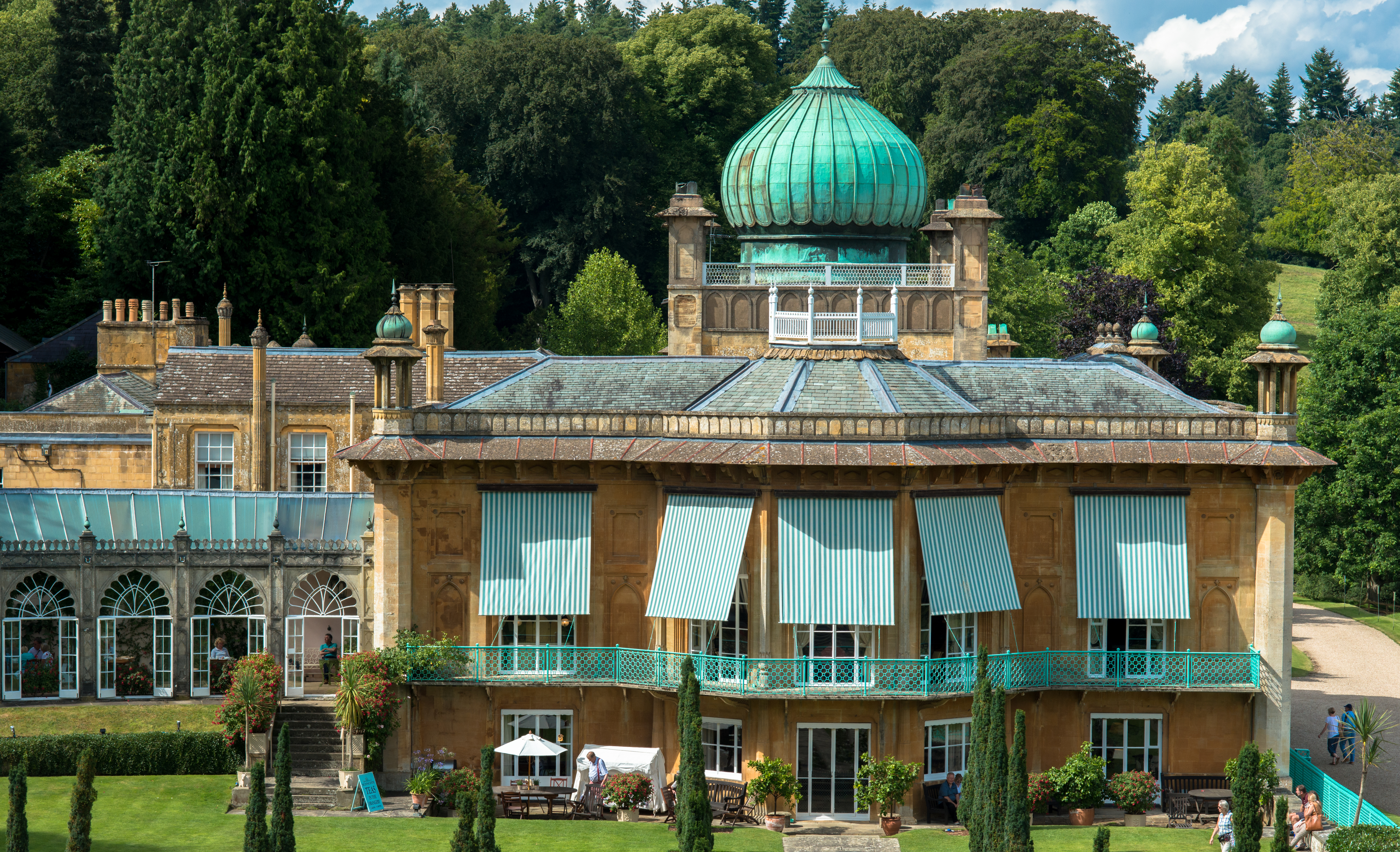
- Interactive map of the Sezincote House area

General information
- Architectural style: Neo-Mughal
- Location: Sezincote, Gloucestershire, England
- Completed: 1805
- Client: Charles Cockerell

Design and construction
- Architect: Samuel Pepys Cockerell

Website
- Sezincote

Sezincote House (pronounced seas in coat) is the centre of a country estate in the civil parish of Sezincote, in the county of Gloucestershire, England. The house was designed by Samuel Pepys Cockerell, built in 1805, and is a notable example of Neo-Mughal architecture, a 19th-century reinterpretation of 16th and 17th-century architecture from the Mughal Empire.

Sezincote is dominated by its red sandstone colour, typical in Mughal architecture, but features a copper-covered dome instead of the typical white marble. The fenestration is composed of a sequence of extra-large windows with an arch-shape at the top. The arch, however, is not a simple or typical design, but instead a shell-like fan that is evidence of the Mughal influence. The interior design is more typical European style.

The landscape was designed by Humphry Repton. It is essentially a renaissance-style garden with elements of Hindu style, as seen in the crescent bridge with columns.

== Site and commission ==
The house is in countryside 1 1/2 miles (2.4 km) from Moreton-in-Marsh, "set on high ground in the shelter of the Cotswolds". Colonel John Cockerell bought the estate in 1795 on his return from Bengal where he had been in the service of the East India Company (EIC). After his death in 1798, his youngest brother, Sir Charles Cockerell, inherited the property who then "employed another brother, Samuel Pepys Cockerell, to build him a house in the Indian manner."

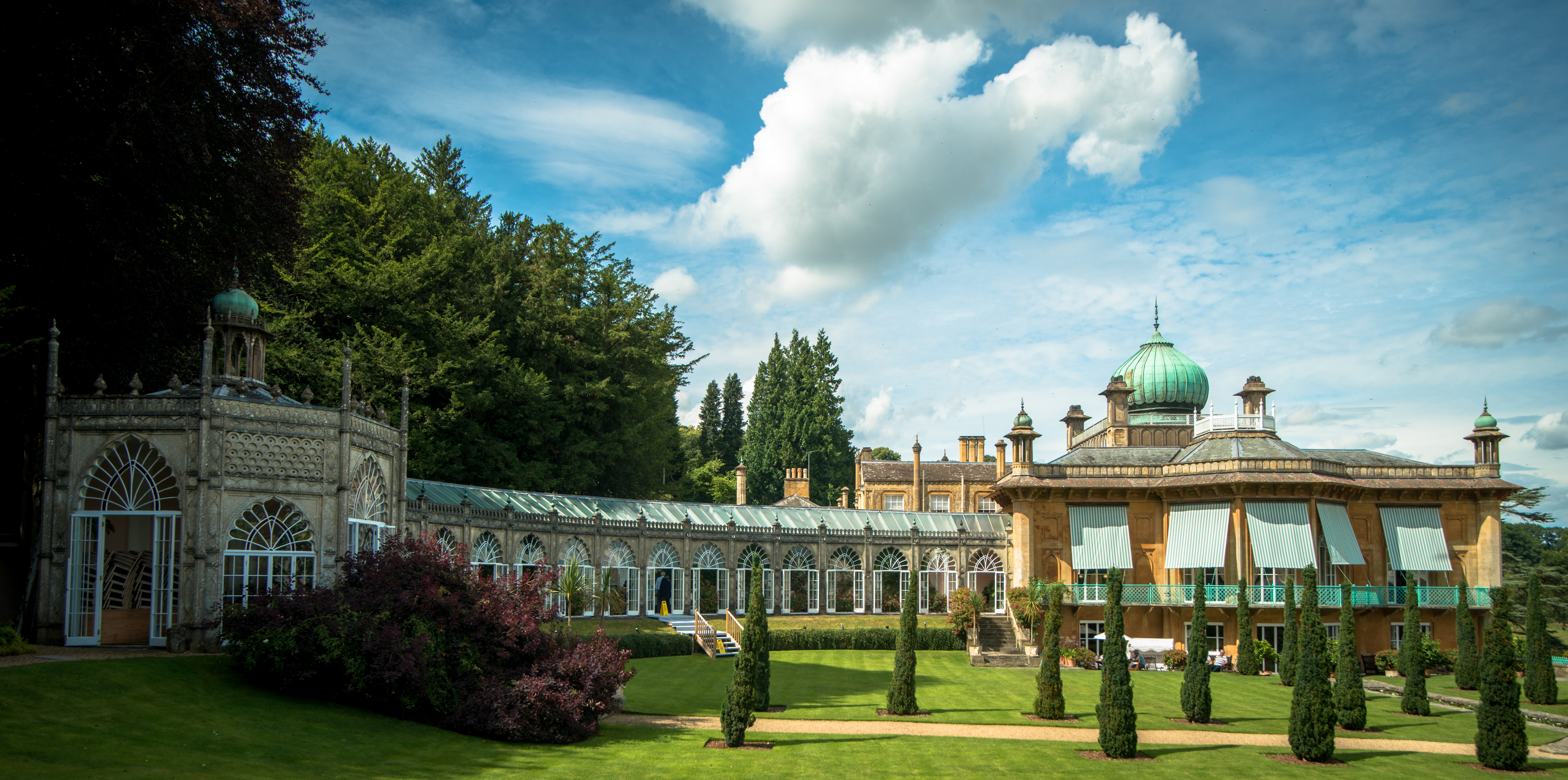
The house and orangery, from the south

Samuel Pepys Cockerell had worked as a surveyor for the EIC and as an apprentice to Sir Robert Taylor, where John Nash was also apprenticed. In spite of his tenure as Surveyor to the East India Company, Cockerell never travelled to India; his encounters with Mughal architecture, a building style that flourished in India in the 16th century, were strictly through the medium of drawings and engravings, such as those by Thomas Daniell (who designed the garden for his "old Indian ally" Sir Charles Cockerell and its temple, bridge, dairy and farm buildings) and his nephews.

Cockerell had already experimented cautiously with Indian elements at Daylesford, Gloucestershire, built for Warren Hastings, first governor-general of British India, nearby. Here the style is characterized by a striking revival of Islamic architecture in northern India, where Persian, Indian and various provincial styles were fused to produce works of great refinement. Favoured materials included white marble and red sandstone. A notable example is the Taj Mahal, completed in 1648 by the Emperor Shah Jahan.

== Architecture ==
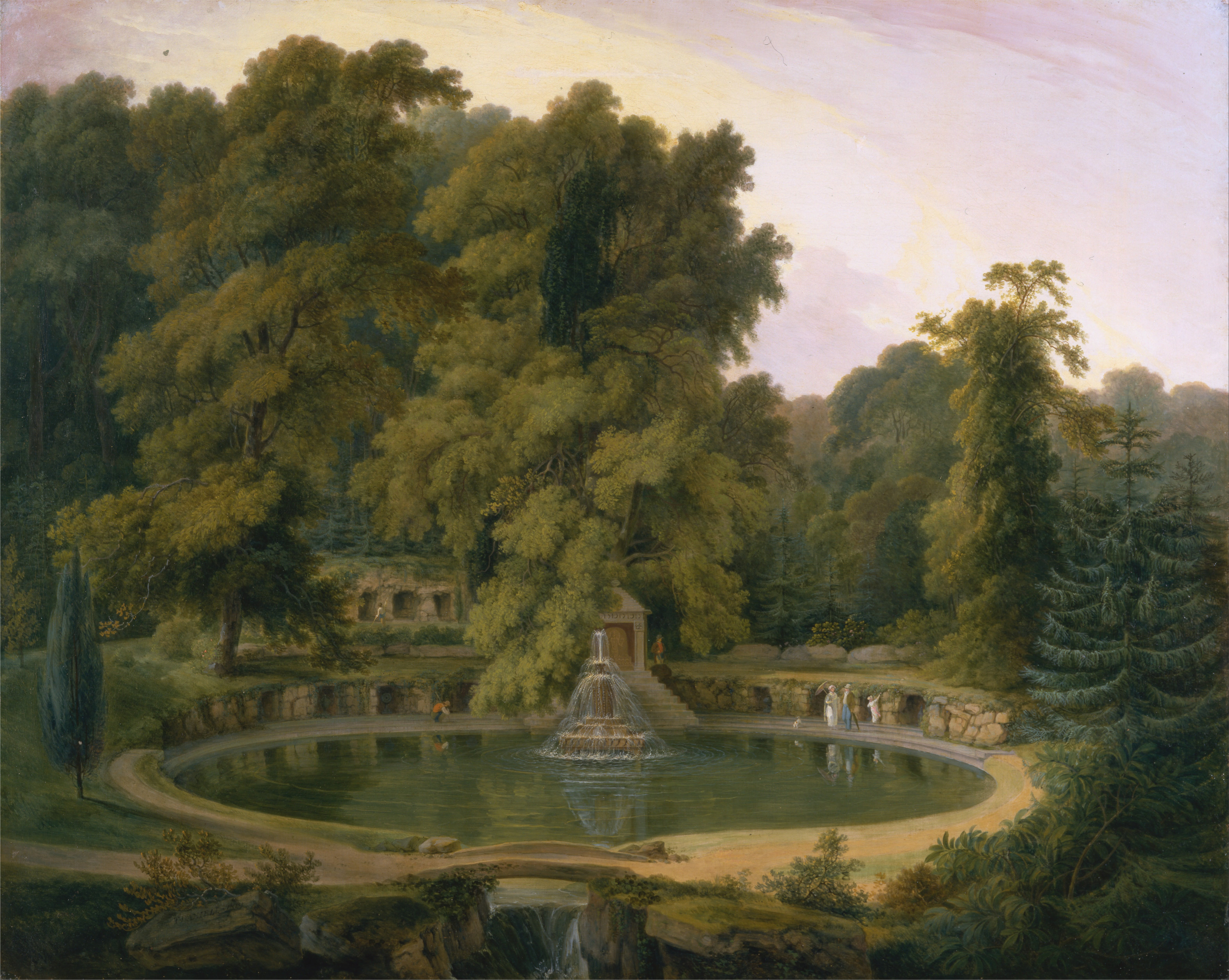
Thomas Daniell - Temple, Fountain and Cave in Sezincote Park, 1819

The architecture of the estate can be described as a British re-interpretation in Georgian architecture of classic Mughal forms. Emperor Akbar, who ruled the empire from 1556 to 1605, "deliberately mixed Islamic and Hindu elements in architecture in an effort to culturally integrate" his kingdom. It has a green onion shaped dome, umbrella-shaped chhatris and overhanging chajjas, Mughal gardens, serpent fountains, a Surya temples, Shiva lingams and has Nandi bulls guarding the estate.

== Construction ==
The house is made of stone, taken from a nearby quarry and may have been artificially stained. Traditional Mughal construction materials would include red sandstone and white marble. Sezincote uses copper, however, on the dome. It is a Grade I listed building.

== Sources ==
- Oxford Dictionary of National Biography: Thomas Daniell (1749–1840)
