= Sezincote (settlement) =

Coordinates: 51.976°N 1.752°W

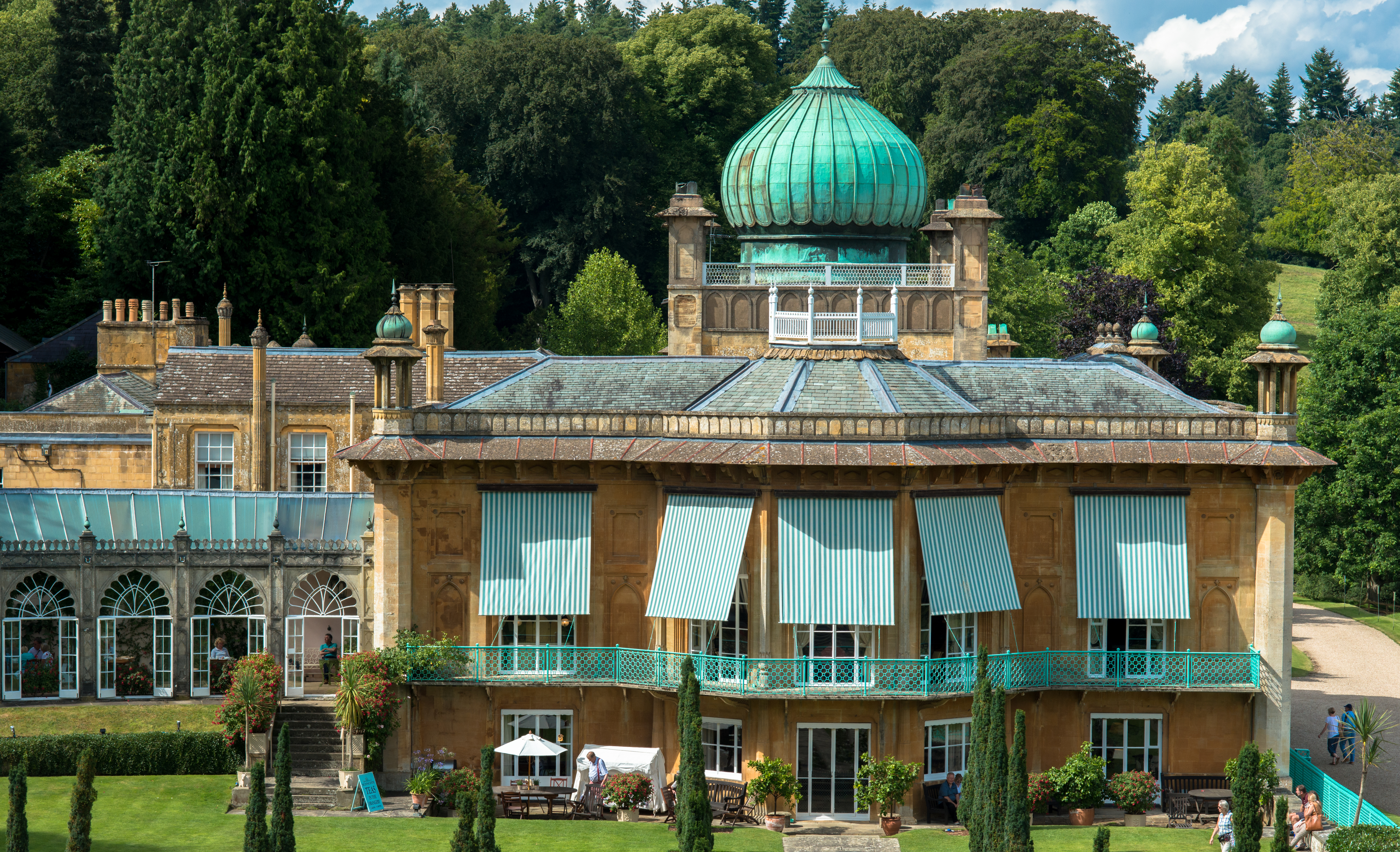
- Sezincote House

- Location within Gloucestershire
- Area: 5.830 km^{2} (2.251 sq mi)
- Population: 90 (2001 census)
  - Density: 15/km^{2} (39/sq mi)
- Civil parish: Sezincote
- District: Cotswold
- Shire county: Gloucestershire
- Region: South West
- Country: England
- Sovereign state: United Kingdom
- Police: Gloucestershire
- Fire: Gloucestershire
- Ambulance: South Western
- UK Parliament: North Cotswolds

Sezincote or Seasoncote is a settlement and civil parish comprising Sezincote House and its estate, situated about 3 miles from Stow-on-the-Wold in the Cotswold district of Gloucestershire, England. In 2001 the parish had a population of 90. The parish touches Bourton-on-the-Hill, Condicote, Cutsdean, Longborough and Moreton-in-Marsh. Sezincote has a parish meeting.

== Landmarks ==
There are 26 listed buildings in Sezincote. Sezincote once had a church called St Bartholomew's but it closed about 1712 and was later demolished.

== History ==
The name "Sezincote" means 'Gravelly cottage'. Sezincote was recorded in the Domesday Book as Cheisnecot(e)/Chi(i)esnecote. No traces of the deserted medieval village of Sezincote have been found in the grounds of Sezincote.
