= Marian Hastings =

Scottish Jacobite supporter (1747–1837)

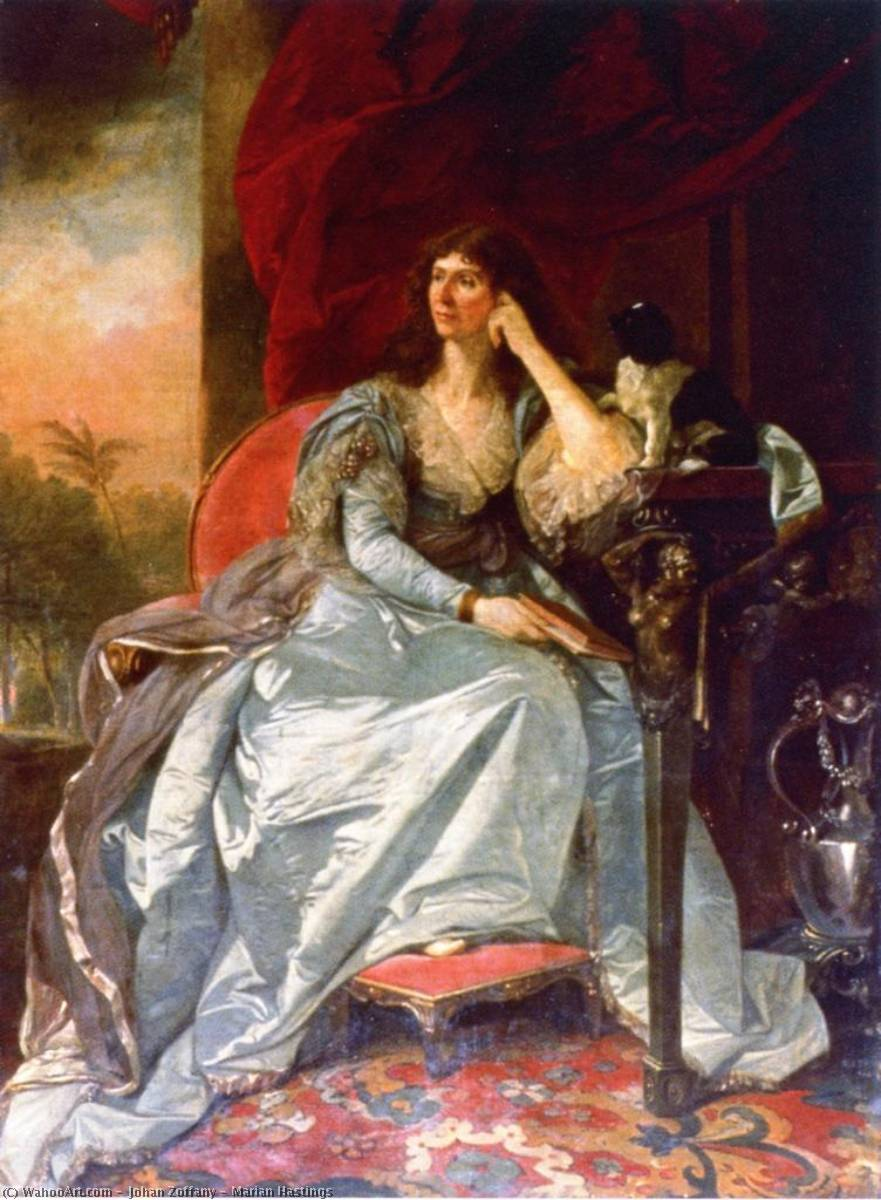
- by Johann Zoffany
- Born: 2 February 1747; Nuremberg
- Died: 1837 (aged 89–90); Daylesford House

Marian Hastings (1747–1837), born Anna Maria Apollonia Chapuset and called Marian von Imhoff, Baroness von Imhoff during her first marriage, was the wife of Warren Hastings, the British governor-general of Bengal in 1772–1785. A native of Nuremberg, she met Hastings on a ship bound for India in 1769 while still married to her first husband, Baron Christoph Carl Adam von Imhoff. Hastings and Marian fell in love, while the Baron von Imhoff returned to Europe in 1772–73 and received a divorce from Marian in 1776. Hastings wed Marian in 1777 and adopted her two sons by her first marriage. She left for England for her health in 1784 and was joined by her husband the next year. Her son Charles inherited their house and estate.

== Life ==
Hastings is believed to have been born in Nuremberg in 1747. One source says on the 2 February. Her parents were Johann Jakob and Caroline Friederike (born Grundgeiger or Krongeiger) and she had a younger brother named Johann Paul Thomas. Her father died in 1758.

She married Carl von Imhoff who was a painter and became the German Baroness Marian von Imhoff in the 1760s. In 1768 she came to England with her husband and two sons after Elizabeth Schwellenberg who was a mistress of the robes to Queen Charlotte arranged for their emigration. Her husband found work with the East India Company as a cadet in their Madras Company. He could be a soldier but his major skill was painting miniatures.

She and her husband were on board the Duke of Grafton at Dover in March 1769 en route for India. When a fellow passenger Warren Hastings became ill, Marian began to care for him. Hastings was travelling to Madras where he was to be the city's deputy ruler. He was a widower as Hastings' first wife, Mary, had died ten years before.

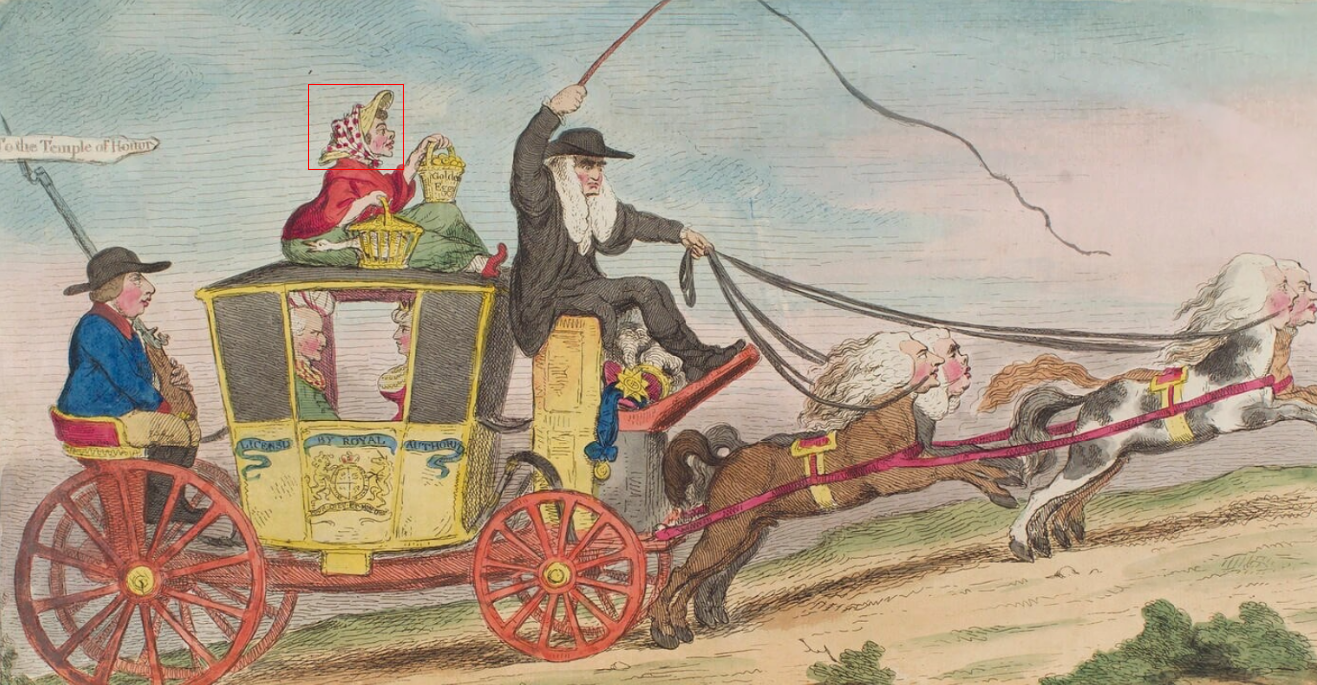
"Coaches" a 1788 cartoon by James Gillray. Warren and Marian Hastings are inside the coach

They fell in love and they began an affair, seemingly with her husband's consent. The divorce took a long time and it was not until 1777 when news came from Germany that Hastings was finally able to marry her in August 1777 in Calcutta. She had returned to her maiden name before the wedding where she described herself as a single woman. Theirs was a happy wedding, Warren was his own man, but he took her views into consideration. She seems to have kept some secrets as Warren estimated her fortune at one point as £40,000 but others estimate it to be over £100,000.

In the 1780s they were living near Calcutta where they had a country home at Alipore. George Thompson, who was Warren Hastings secretary in Calcutta, advised his boss in 1784 that he and his wife should sit for a painting. Thompson said that if it was a good likeness then an engraving should be made as there many poor likenesses of Hastings in circulation. The German painter Johann Zoffany created a painting of them but it was not delivered in 1784 when she left India because of her health. Warren joined her in Britain in 1785.

In 1788 she appeared in two satirical prints by the satirical cartoonist James Gillray.

Her husband died in 1818 at Daylesford. A memorial was erected to him in Westminster Abbey by M.A.Hastings.

== Death and legacy ==
She died in 1837 at Daylesford House and her son inherited the house.

In 2018 her personal seal that was made from a Colombian emerald in a Mughal style in 1783 or 1784 was auctioned by Bonhams. It sold for about £180,000.
