= 213 and 215 King's Road =

Houses in Chelsea, London

Coordinates: 51°29′12″N 0°10′14″W

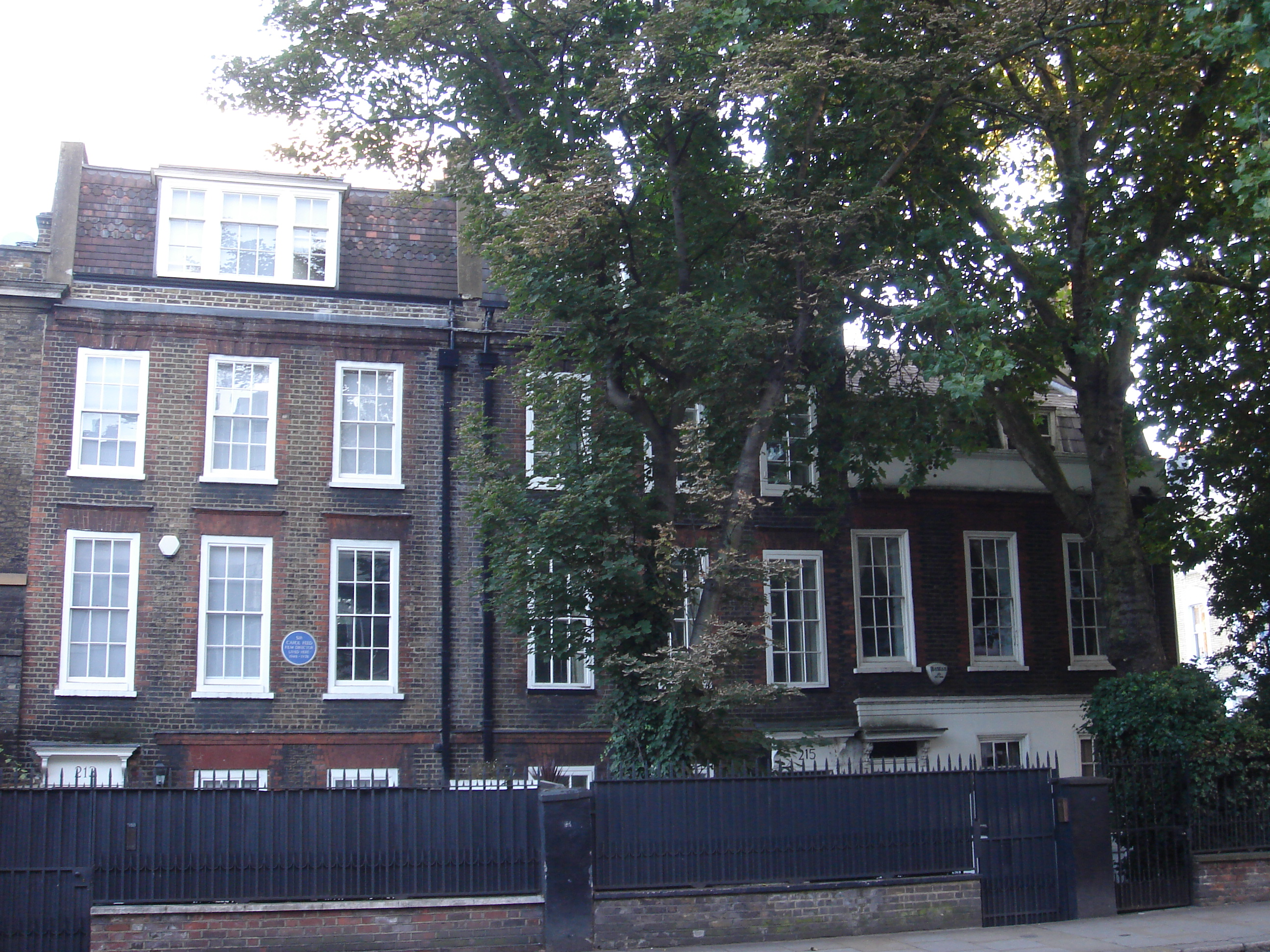
213–217 King's Road

213 and 215 King's Road SW3 are a pair of terraced houses on King's Road, Chelsea, London, built in 1720. English Heritage has designated them a Grade II* listed building.

In the 1920s, No. 213 was inhabited by leading interior decorator Syrie Maugham. There, in 1927 she created her "all white room", decorated in various shades of white, which became widely known and imitated in fashionable circles. Her husband, the novelist Somerset Maugham, briefly also lived there. A rival interior decorator, Sibyl Colefax, lived next door to her at Argyll House, No. 211.

213 has a blue plaque to film director Sir Carol Reed, who lived there with his wife Penelope Dudley-Ward from 1948 until his death in 1976. For a brief time in the late 1950s, singer Judy Garland leased the 213 from Carol Reed, living there with her husband Sid Luft and three children. In 1973 they were joined by Carol Reed's wife's cousin Belinda Lambton and her son Ned, after her husband Antony Lambton went to live in Italy with his mistress. Her visitors at number 213 included Leigh Bowery, Mick Jagger and Jerry Hall, Jools Holland and his band, and Shimi Lovat.

215 was the residence in 1771 of the composer Thomas Arne and has a tablet commemorating Dame Ellen Terry, who lived there from 1904 to 1920.

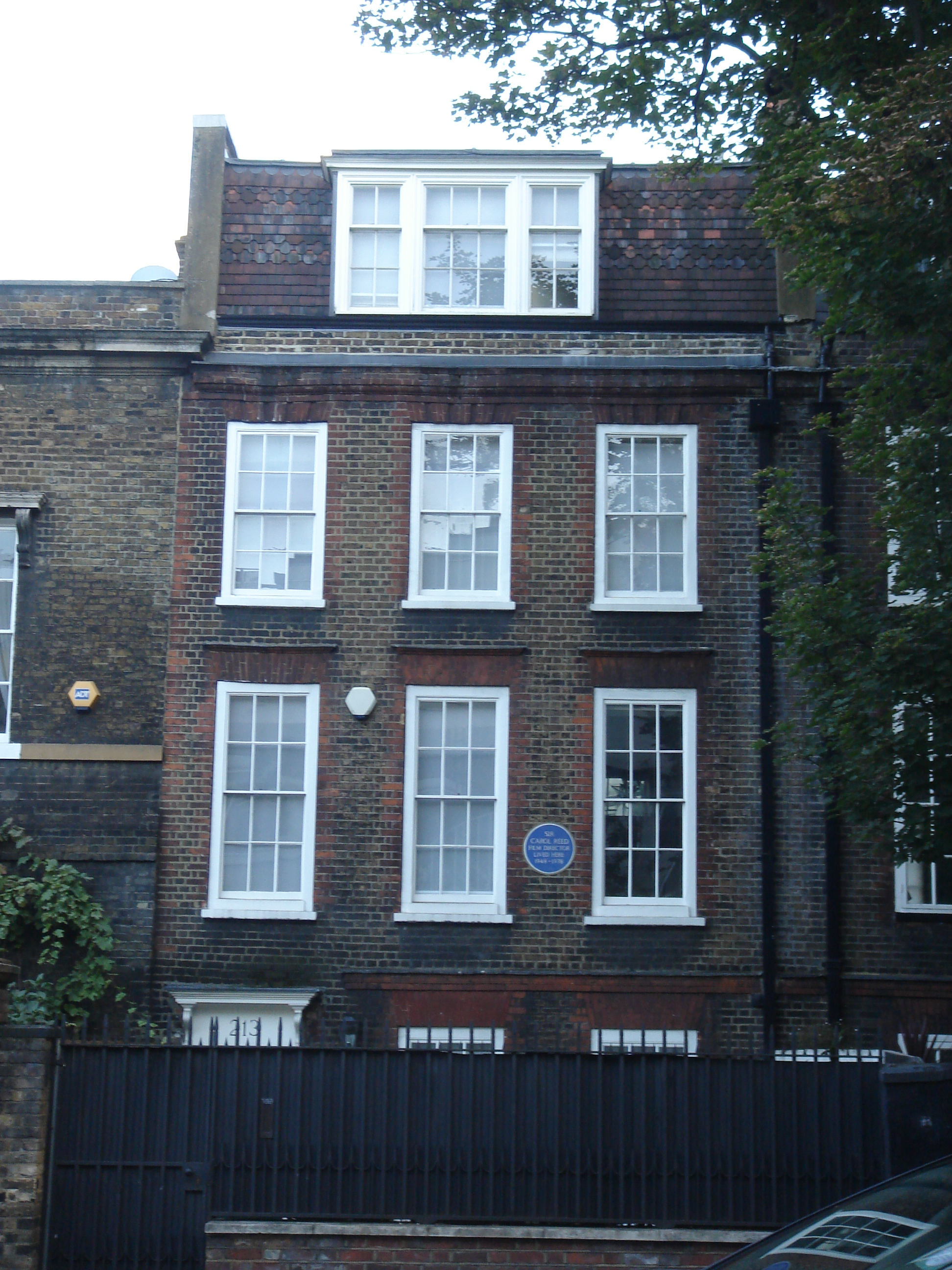
213 King's Road

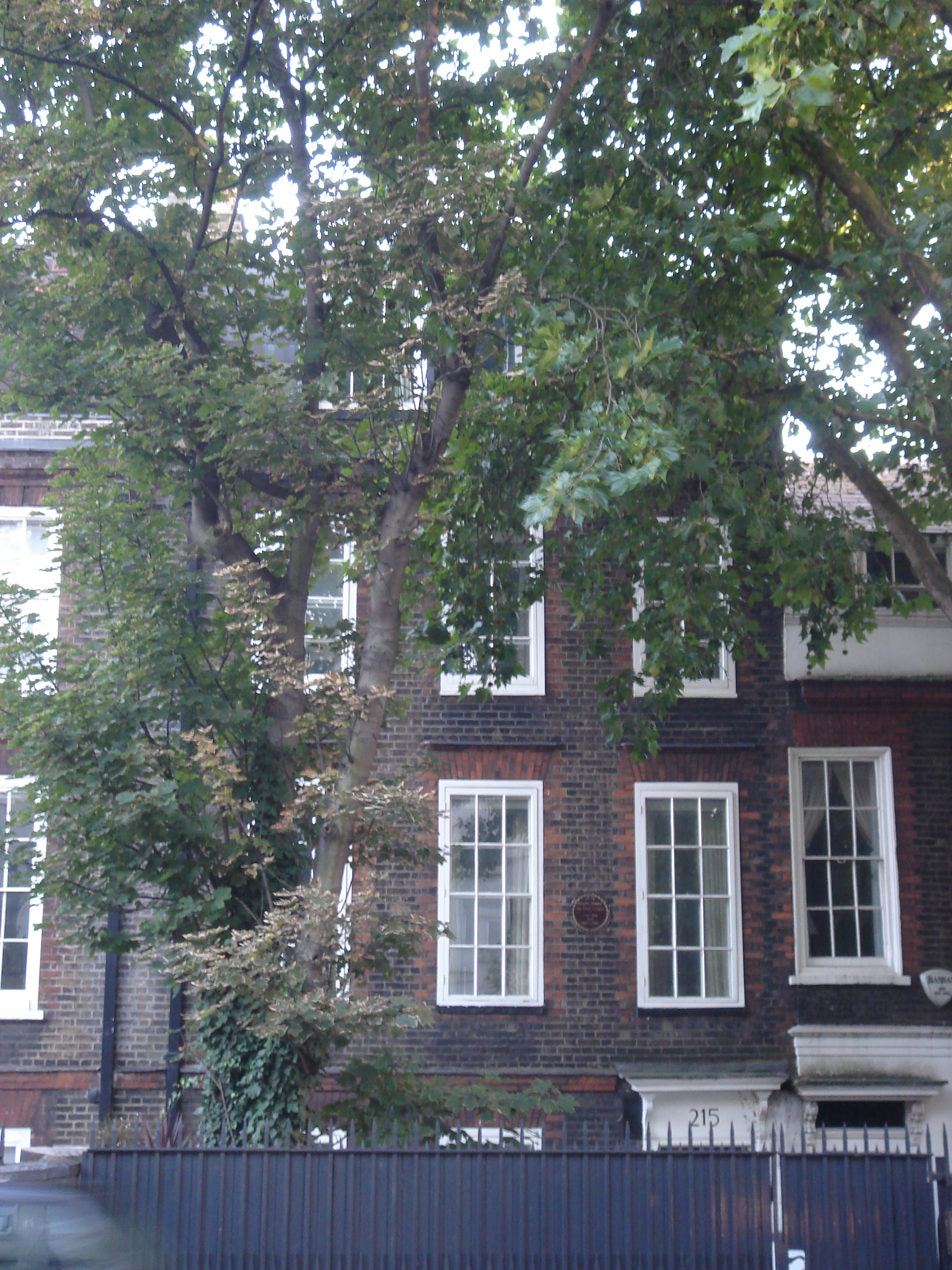
215 King's Road

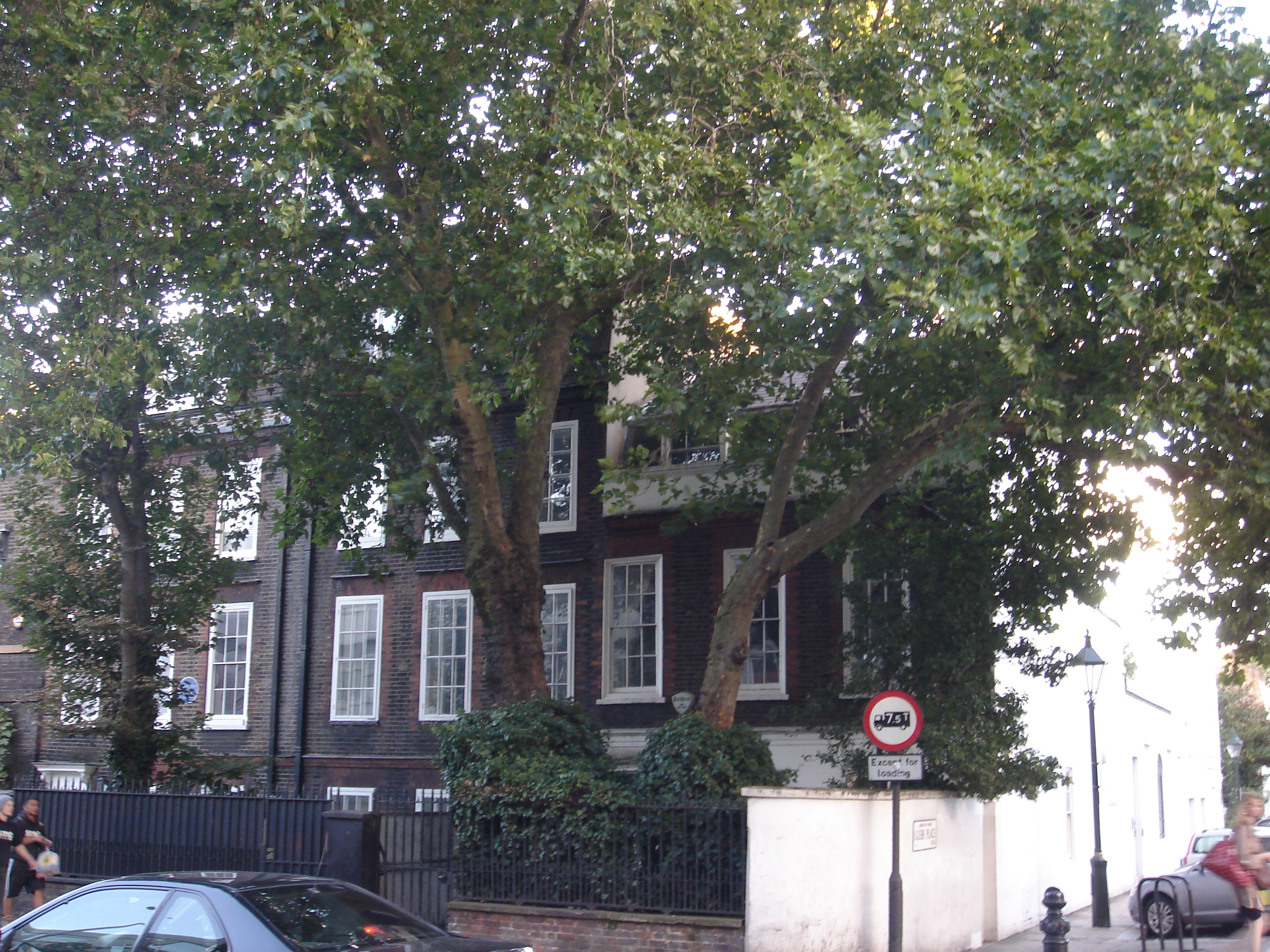
213–217 King's Road
