= 217 King's Road =

Grade II* listed house in London, England

Coordinates: 51°29′12″N 0°10′14″W

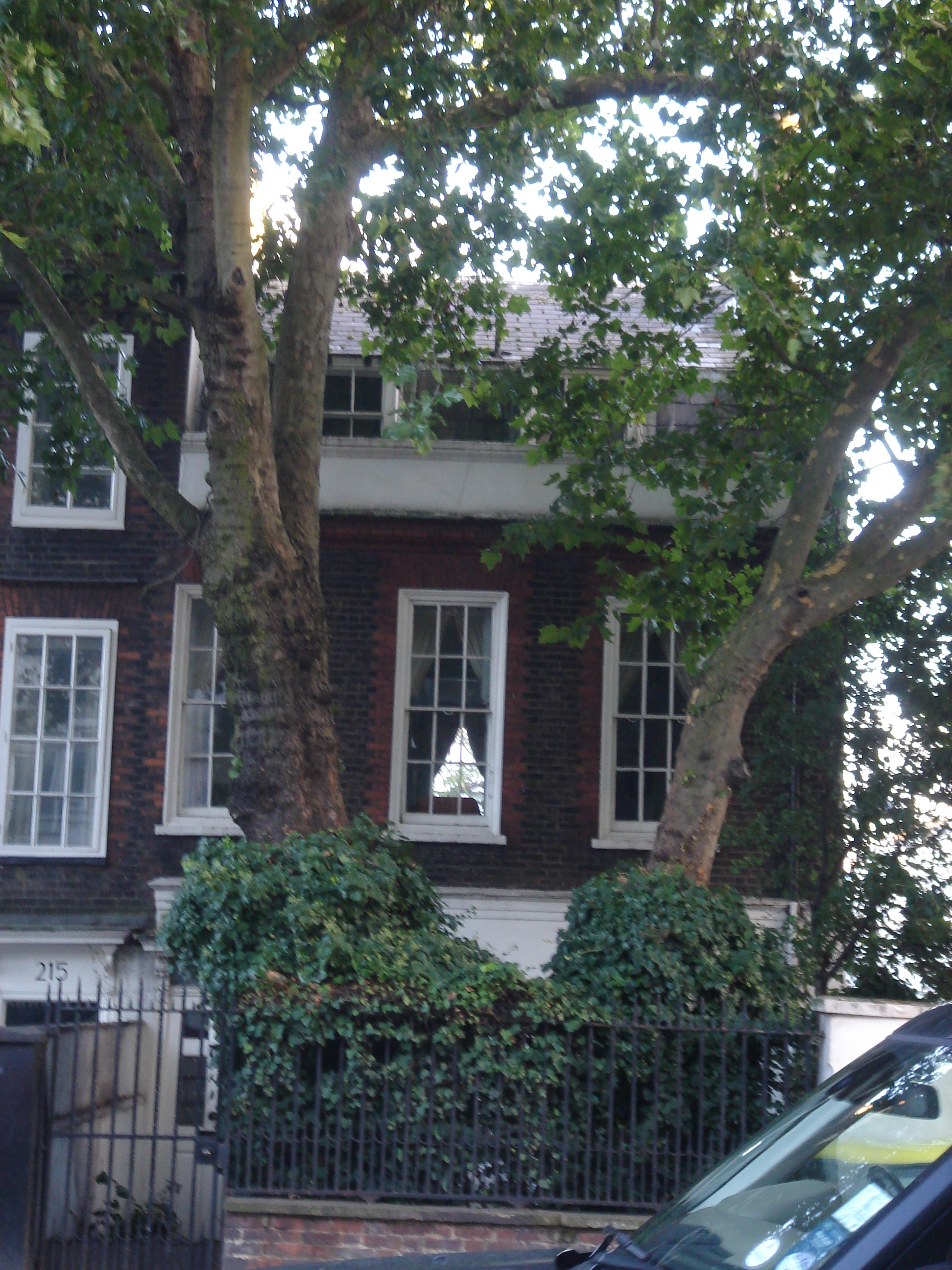
217 King's Road

217 King's Road is a Grade II* listed house on King's Road, Chelsea, London, built in about 1750.

From 1775 to 1777 it was the residence of James Hutton (3 September 1715 to 1795), founder of the Moravian Church of the British Province. (see: Peter Boehler, Benjamin Ingham, Nicolaus Zinzendorf)
