= Colefax Group =

Luxury fabric and wallpaper company in the UK

Colefax Group plc
- Company type: Public limited company
- Traded as: LSE: CFX
- Industry: Luxury fabric and wallpaper company
- Headquarters: United Kingdom
- Area served: United Kingdom, United States, and Europe
- Key people: David Green (Chief Executive)
- Revenue: £80.48 million (2017)
- Operating income: £2.94 million (2017)
- Website: www.colefaxgroupplc.com

Colefax Group plc is a designer and distributor of furnishing fabrics and wallpaper, based in London, United Kingdom.

== History ==
The business was founded in the 1930s by Sibyl, Lady Colefax (1874–1950). In 1938, she was joined in the business by John Fowler, and the business became known as Colefax & Fowler. In 1944, the business, managed by Fowler, took a lease on 39 Brook Street, Mayfair where it remained until December 2016. Also in 1944, Colefax sold the business to Nancy Tree (Nancy Lancaster as she became in 1948) for a sum in the order of £10,000.

The group now has offices in the United States, France, Germany and Italy. It owns the brands Colefax and Fowler, Cowtan and Tout, Jane Churchill, Larsen and Manuel Canovas.
