= Nancy Lancaster =

US-British interior designer and socialite (1897–1994)

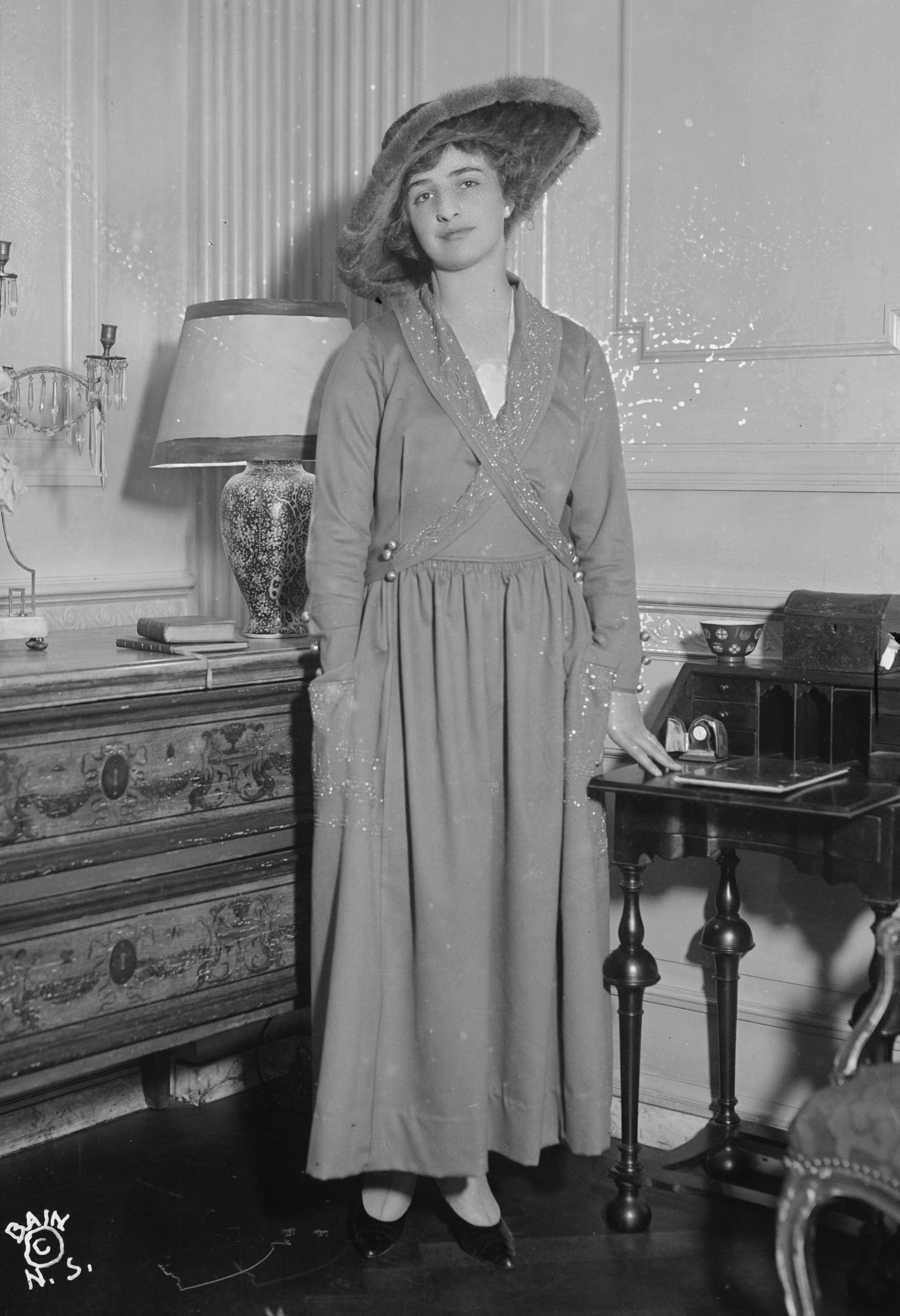
- Nancy Perkins in 1916
- Born: Nancy Keene Perkins; 10 September 1897; Mirador, Virginia, U.S.
- Died: 19 August 1994 (aged 96); Little Haseley, Oxfordshire, England
- Resting place: Emmanuel Episcopal Church Cemetery, Greenwood, Albemarle County, Virginia, U.S.
- Occupations: Interior designer, interior decorator, socialite
- Spouses: Henry Field (m. 1917; died 1918) Ronald Tree (m. 1920; div. 1947) Claude Lancaster (m. 1948; div. 1953)
- Children: 3, including Jeremy Tree

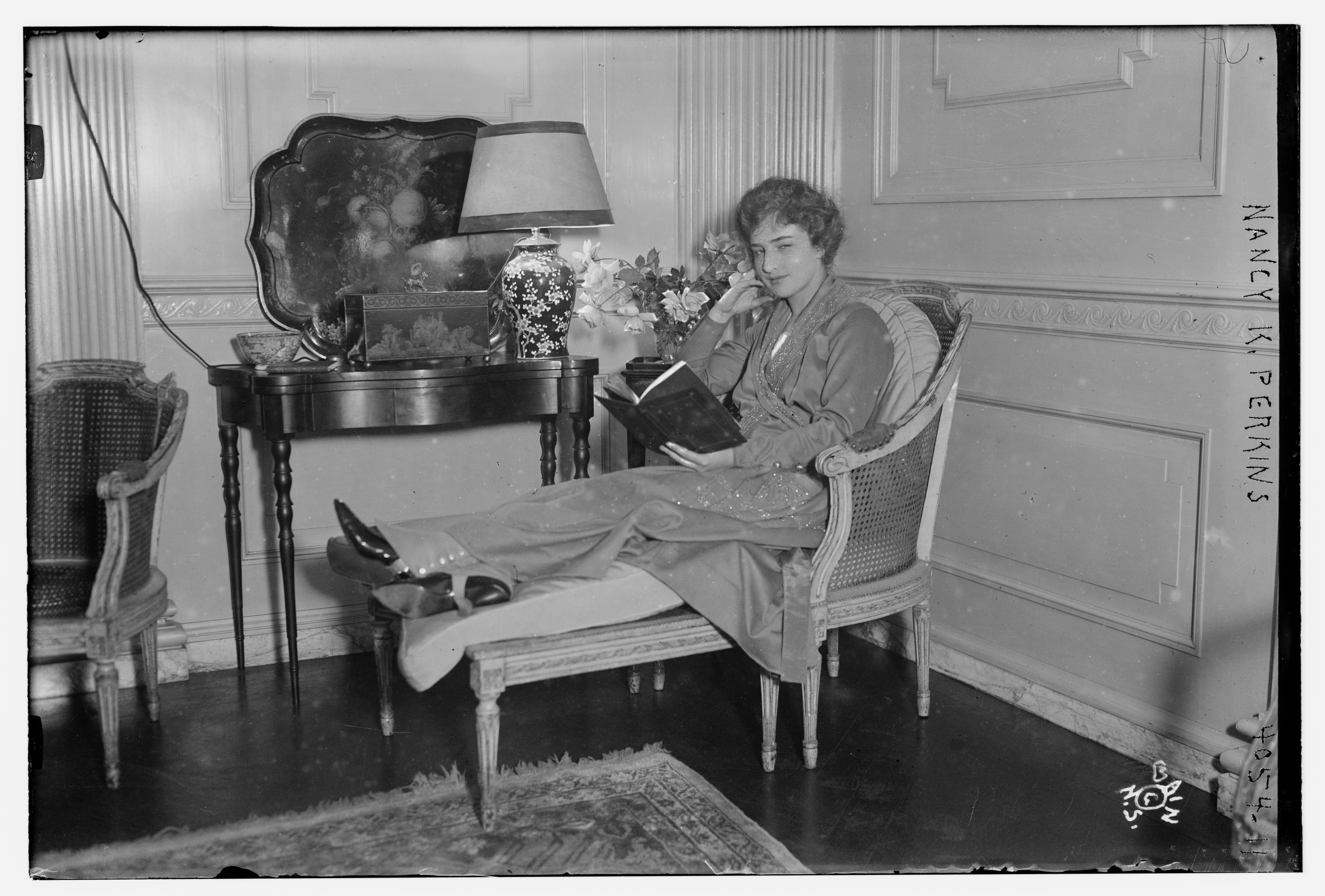
Nancy Perkins in 1916

Nancy Lancaster (10 September 1897 – 19 August 1994) was a 20th-century tastemaker and the owner of Colefax & Fowler, an influential British decorating firm that codified what is known as the English country house look.

== Biography ==
She was born Nancy Keene Perkins as the elder daughter of Thomas Moncure Perkins, a Virginia cotton broker, and his wife Elizabeth Langhorne, a daughter of Chiswell Langhorne. Her birthplace was Mirador, the estate farm of her maternal grandfather, in Greenwood, near Charlottesville, Virginia. She was brought up in Richmond, Virginia and New York City. Nancy Lancaster had four maternal aunts, of whom the most notable were Nancy, Lady Astor, a British politician, and Irene Gibson, wife of artist Charles Dana Gibson, who popularized the Gibson Girl. Her cousin Joyce Grenfell was a celebrated British monologuist and actress. Nancy was graduated from Foxcroft School in Middleburg, Virginia in 1915, which was founded by her distant cousin, Charlotte Haxall Noland.

== Personal life ==
=== First marriage ===
Nancy was first married, on February 7, 1917, to Henry Field, a grandson of Marshall Field, the wealthy founder of the Chicago department store. He died five months later on July 8, 1917 at age 22 at Presbyterian Hospital in New York City following an operation.

=== Second marriage ===
In 1920 Nancy married journalist and investor Ronald Tree (1897–1976), a cousin of her first husband. After moving to England in 1927, they had two sons, Michael Lambert Tree (1921-1999) and Jeremy Tree (1925-1993), and a daughter, Rosemary, who died at birth in 1922. Michael married Lady Anne Cavendish, a daughter of Edward Cavendish, 10th Duke of Devonshire.

At first the Trees took a 10-year repairing lease on Kelmarsh Hall near Market Harborough in Northamptonshire, which Nancy redecorated with help from Mrs Guy Bethell of Elden Ltd. In 1933, the Trees bought Ditchley Park near Charlbury in Oxfordshire, and it was the decoration of this house which earned Nancy the reputation of having "the best taste of almost anyone in the world." She worked on it with Sibyl Colefax (Mrs Bethell having died) and the French decorator Stéphane Boudin of the Paris firm Jansen.

In November 1933, Ronald Tree became the Conservative Party member of Parliament for Harborough. Tree was among a small group who saw the rising Nazi party in Germany as a threat to Britain, and he became a member of a clique of anti-appeasement MPs (who included Eden, Duff Cooper and others) who would meet at his house in Queen Anne's Gate. Winston Churchill was not part of this group, but he and his wife Clementine dined at Ditchley on numerous occasions from 1937.

On the outbreak of war, the authorities were concerned by the vulnerability to enemy air attack of both Churchill's country house Chartwell and the Prime Minister's retreat of Chequers especially, as Churchill romantically termed it 'When the Moon is High'. Churchill had use of the Paddock bunker in Neasden, but only used it on one occasion for a cabinet meeting, before returning to his Cabinet War Room bunker in Whitehall. However, this created additional difficulties on clear nights when a full moon was predicted - so the authorities looked for an alternative site north of London. Tree offered Churchill use of Ditchley which, thanks to its tree coverage and lack of visible access road made it an ideal site Churchill was happy with. Churchill first went to Ditchley in lieu of Chequers on 9 November 1940, accompanied by Clementine and his daughter Mary. By late 1942, America had entered the war and the security at Chequers had improved, including covering the road with turf. The last weekend Churchill attended Ditchley as his official residence was Tree's birthday on 26 September 1942. Churchill's last visit was for lunch in 1943.

Churchill gave Tree a job in the Ministry of Information, where he met American co-worker Marietta Peabody FitzGerald. The two began an affair. After Tree lost his seat in the 1945 election, Tree and Peabody divorced their respective partners and married on 26 July 1947. In 1949, their only child was born, the 1960s supermodel Penelope Tree.

=== Third marriage ===
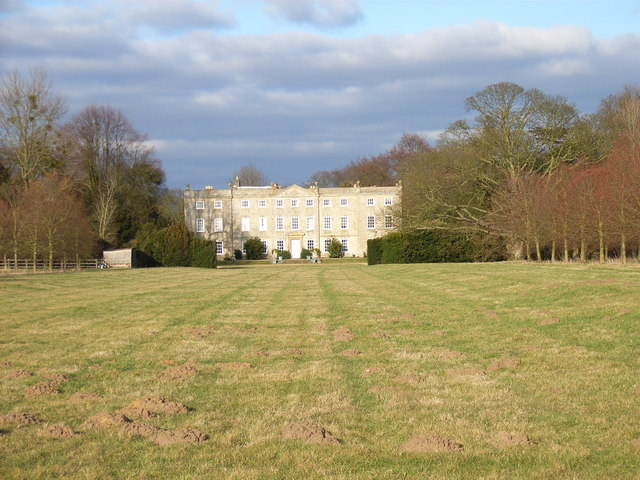
Haseley Court Little Haseley, Oxfordshire

Nancy married, thirdly, in 1948, Lieutenant Colonel Claude Lancaster (1899–1977), a former military officer, country squire and member of Parliament who owned Kelmarsh Hall near Market Harborough, Northamptonshire. Renowned today for its gardens, it is a popular tourist site and said to be Nancy Lancaster's favorite home of all, despite their divorce after only five years in 1953. The couple had been having an affair for years prior to their marriage. Nancy Lancaster later claimed that it was the suffocating, day-to-day intimacy of marriage that made her realise why they were successful as lovers and ill-suited as husband and wife.

In 1950, Nancy was forced to sell her beloved Mirador and in 1954 she bought Haseley Court near Oxford. She renovated and decorated the house with the help of her business partner, John Fowler (1906–1977). They also created the famous Yellow Room at Avery Row, Mayfair. After a fire in 1971, she sold the main house at Haseley and moved into the coach house, where she lived for the rest of her life. The garden she created at Haseley was particularly famous for its sense of style. The renowned British interior designer David Hicks (1929–1998) called Nancy Lancaster "the most influential English gardener since Gertrude Jekyll." Referred to as the doyenne of interior decorators (something she never was, nor ever claimed to be) and smart gardeners, she together with John Fowler created much of the English country house look.

== Death ==
Nancy Lancaster died in 1994 and is buried in Virginia, between her first husband and the infant daughter from her second marriage.

Obituary from Independent, August 24, 1994
