= John Beresford Fowler =

English interior designer (1906–1977)

John Beresford Fowler (20 June 1906 – 27 October 1977) was an English interior designer.

== Early life ==
Fowler was born in Lingfield, Surrey, son of Robert Richard Fowler, clerk of the course at the fashionable Lingfield Park Racecourse, and Blanche Beresford, née Forster. He moved with his family to Bedford Park, London following his father's death in 1915. He was educated Tormore prep school, and at Felsted School. He left school aged 16 in 1923.

== Career ==
He joined the decorating and antiques firm Thornton Smith, where he painted Chinese-style wallpaper (sold as 18th century originals), and learned other paint decoration techniques, such as marbling and graining. He moved to work in the studio of decorator Margaret Kunzer, and started to decorate furniture for Peter Jones. He established his own business on the Kings Road in Chelsea in 1934, and then went into business with Sybil Colefax, founding Colefax & Fowler. His short sightedness made him medically unfit for military service in the Second World War, but he became an air raid warden and hospital orderly. The decorating business went through a slump during the privations of wartime and post-war austerity, and the business was bought by Nancy Tree (then married to Ronald Tree, and later to Claude Lancaster), principally so they would redecorate her house at Haseley Court. Their personalities clashed: Nancy Astor described them as "the most unhappy unmarried couple in England".

He leased the Hunting Lodge at Odiham in Hampshire from the National Trust in 1947, and his simple but elegant decorative scheme made a great impact. As wartime restrictions relaxed, the decorating business prospered, and Fowler was involved in the redecoration of dozens of substantial country houses and town houses, including Radbourne Hall, Daylesford House, Tyninghame House and Grimsthorpe Castle. He collaborated with John Cornforth to write English Decoration in the 18th Century, published in 1976. He considered himself an "haute couture decorator" but aimed for simple or humble elegance.

He also worked on decorative schemes for Buckingham Palace, Holyroodhouse, Chequers, Chevening, Christ Church, Oxford, and the Bank of England.

He was appointed a Commander of the Order of the British Empire in 1973 and retired in 1975 but had been an adviser to the National Trust since the 1950s and continued to provide them with his advice. He worked on at least 30 of the National Trust's properties, including in particular Clandon Park, Sudbury Hall and Erddig.

== Later life ==
He died of cancer. He never married. After his death his home at Odiham was leased by interior designer Nicky Haslam.
