= Sibyl Colefax =

English interior decorator and socialite (1874–1950)

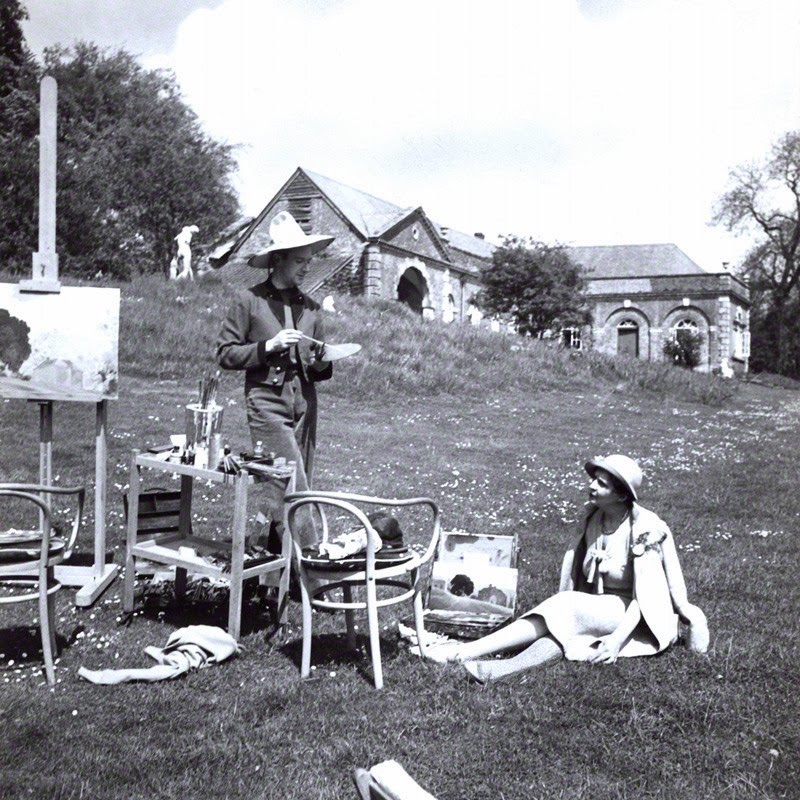
Sibyl, Lady Colefax with Cecil Beaton

Sibyl Sophie Julia, Lady Colefax (née Halsey; 1874 – 22 September 1950) was an English interior decorator and socialite in the first half of the twentieth century.

== Biography ==
Colefax was born at Wimbledon. Her father was William Stirling Halsey, of the Indian Civil Service, and her mother was Sophie Victoria, daughter of the businessman and politician James Wilson. Her mother's sister, Emily, married the eminent constitutionalist Walter Bagehot. She lived in Cawnpore, India, until the age of 20 when she went on the Grand Tour. In 1901, she married patent lawyer Arthur Colefax, who was briefly the MP for Manchester South West in 1910. They set up home at Argyll House, King's Road, Chelsea and at Old Buckhurst in Sussex. Widely admired for her taste, after she had lost most of her fortune in the Wall Street crash she began to decorate professionally, using her formidable address book for contacts. She was able to purchase the decorating division of the antique dealers Stair and Andrew of Bruton Street, Mayfair and established Sibyl Colefax Ltd in partnership with Peggy Ward, the Countess Munster. On her retirement, following a family tragedy, Ward advised her to take on John Fowler as her partner, which she did in April 1938. The advent of war cut short this partnership. During the Second World War, she organised a soup kitchen and continued to entertain. She often held small lunch parties at The Dorchester known as 'Ordinaries' after which the guest would receive a small bill.

She had an affair with Virginia Woolf, and corresponded with Woolf's husband upon Woolf's death in 1941.

In 1944, the business, managed by John Fowler, took a lease on 39 Brook Street, Mayfair where it remained until December 2016. Also in 1944 Sibyl Colefax sold the business to Tree for around £1,0000. She renamed the business Sibyl Colefax and John Fowler Ltd, the name continuing today as the decorating division of the Colefax Group Plc.

Colefax died at her home in Lord North Street, Westminster on 22 September 1950. Harold Nicolson penned an affectionate tribute that appeared in The Listener. She was the inspiration, according to the art historian John Richardson, for the designer Mrs Beaver in Evelyn Waugh's A Handful of Dust, and for Mrs Aldwinkle in Aldous Huxley's Those Barren Leaves. In the 1940s she was referred to frequently by the diarist and socialite politician Henry "Chips" Channon, who described her as "charming, gentle and sad".

== See also ==
- Interior designer
