= Warren Hastings =

Governor-General of Bengal, 1773–1785

The Right Honourable Warren Hastings FRS
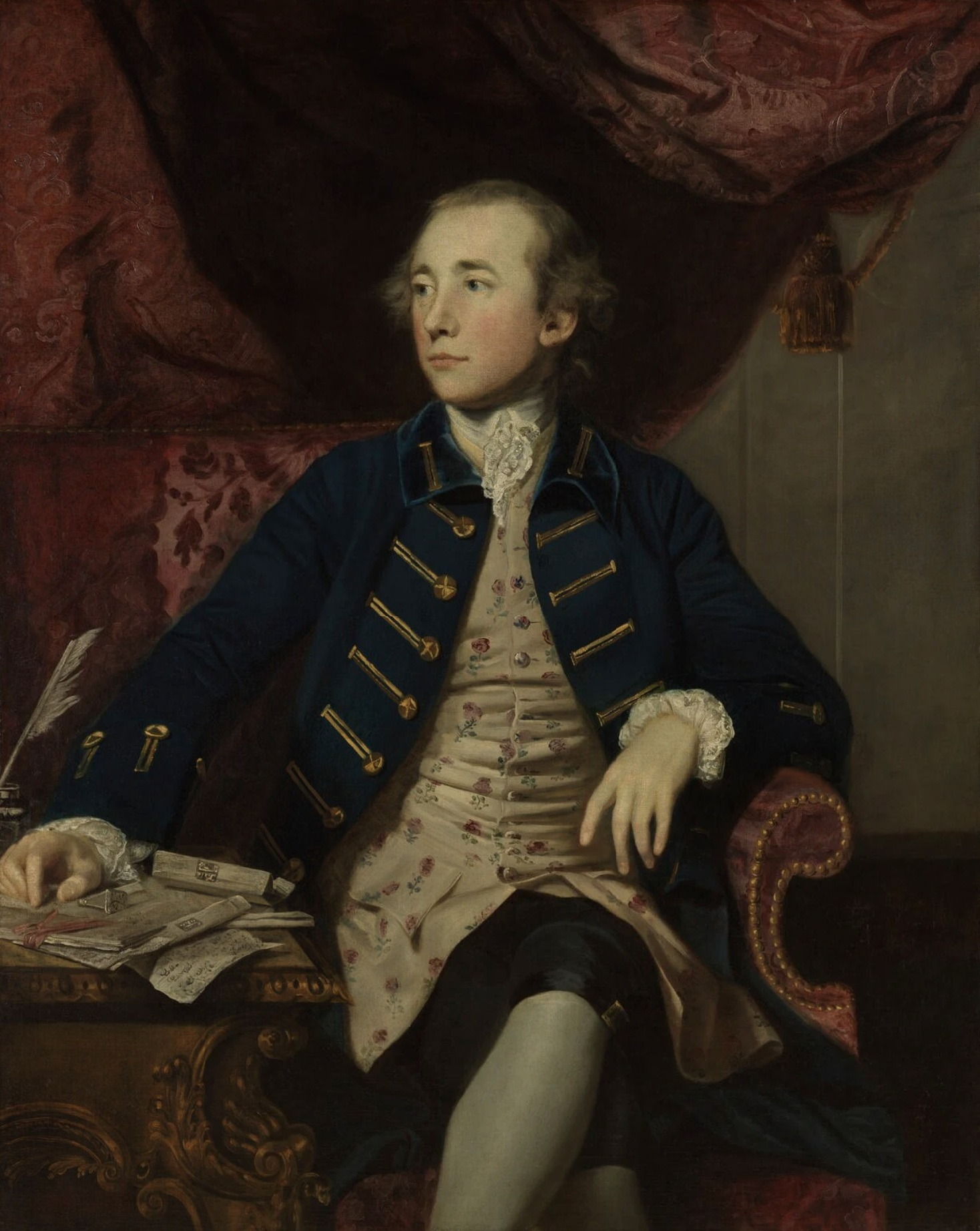
- Portrait by Sir Joshua Reynolds, 1766–1767

Governor-General of the Presidency of Fort William
- In office 20 October 1773 – 8 February 1785
- Monarch: George III
- Preceded by: Position created
- Succeeded by: Sir John Macpherson, Bt; As acting Governor-General

Governor of the Presidency of Fort William (Bengal)
- In office 28 April 1772 – 20 October 1773
- Preceded by: John Cartier
- Succeeded by: Position abolished

Personal details
- Born: 6 December 1732 Churchill, Oxfordshire, England
- Died: 22 August 1818 (aged 85) Daylesford, Worcestershire, England
- Spouse(s): Mary Buchanan (m. 1756; died 1759) Marian Hastings (m. 1777)
- Education: Westminster School

Warren Hastings (6 December 1732 – 22 August 1818) was a British colonial administrator, who served as the first governor of the Presidency of Fort William (Bengal), the head of the Supreme Council of Bengal, and so the first governor-general of Bengal in 1772–1785. He and Robert Clive are credited with laying the foundation of the British Empire in India. He was an energetic organizer and reformer. In 1779–1784, he led forces of the East India Company against a coalition of native states and the French. In the end, the well-organised British side held its own, while France lost influence in India. In 1787, he was accused of corruption and impeached, but he was eventually acquitted in 1795 after a long trial. He was made a privy councillor in 1814.

== Early life and education ==
Warren Hastings was born in Churchill, Oxfordshire in 1732 to Reverend Penyston Hastings and his wife Hester (née Warren), who died soon after he was born. Within nine months of Warren's birth, his father remarried and moved to Barbados, leaving behind Warren and his elder sister Anne. Young Warren was raised by his grandfather (also called Penyston) and attended a charity school in Daylesford, Gloucestershire. Eventually, he was taken in by his uncle, Howard Hastings, and moved with him to London in 1740.

Hastings attended Westminster School, where he coincided with the future prime ministers Lord Shelburne and the Duke of Portland and with the poet William Cowper. He quickly excelled as a top scholar but was forced to leave at sixteen, when his uncle died. He joined the British East India Company in 1750 as a writer (clerk) and sailed out to India, reaching Calcutta in August 1750. There he built up a reputation for diligence and spent his free time learning about India and mastering Urdu and Persian. His work won him promotion in 1752 when he was sent to Kasimbazar, a major trading post in Bengal, where he worked for William Watts. While there he gained further experience in the politics of East India.

British traders still relied on the whims of local rulers, so the political turmoil in Bengal was unsettling. The elderly moderate Nawab Alivardi Khan was likely to be succeeded by his grandson Siraj ud-Daulah, but there were several other claimants. This made British trading posts throughout Bengal increasingly insecure, as Siraj ud-Daulah was known to harbour anti-European views and to be likely to launch an attack once he took power. When Alivardi Khan died in April 1756, the British traders and a small garrison at Kasimbazar were left vulnerable. On 3 June, after being surrounded by a much larger force, the British were persuaded to surrender to prevent a massacre. Hastings was imprisoned with others in the Bengali capital, Murshidabad, while the Nawab's forces marched on Calcutta and captured it. The garrison and civilians were then locked up under appalling conditions in the Black Hole of Calcutta.

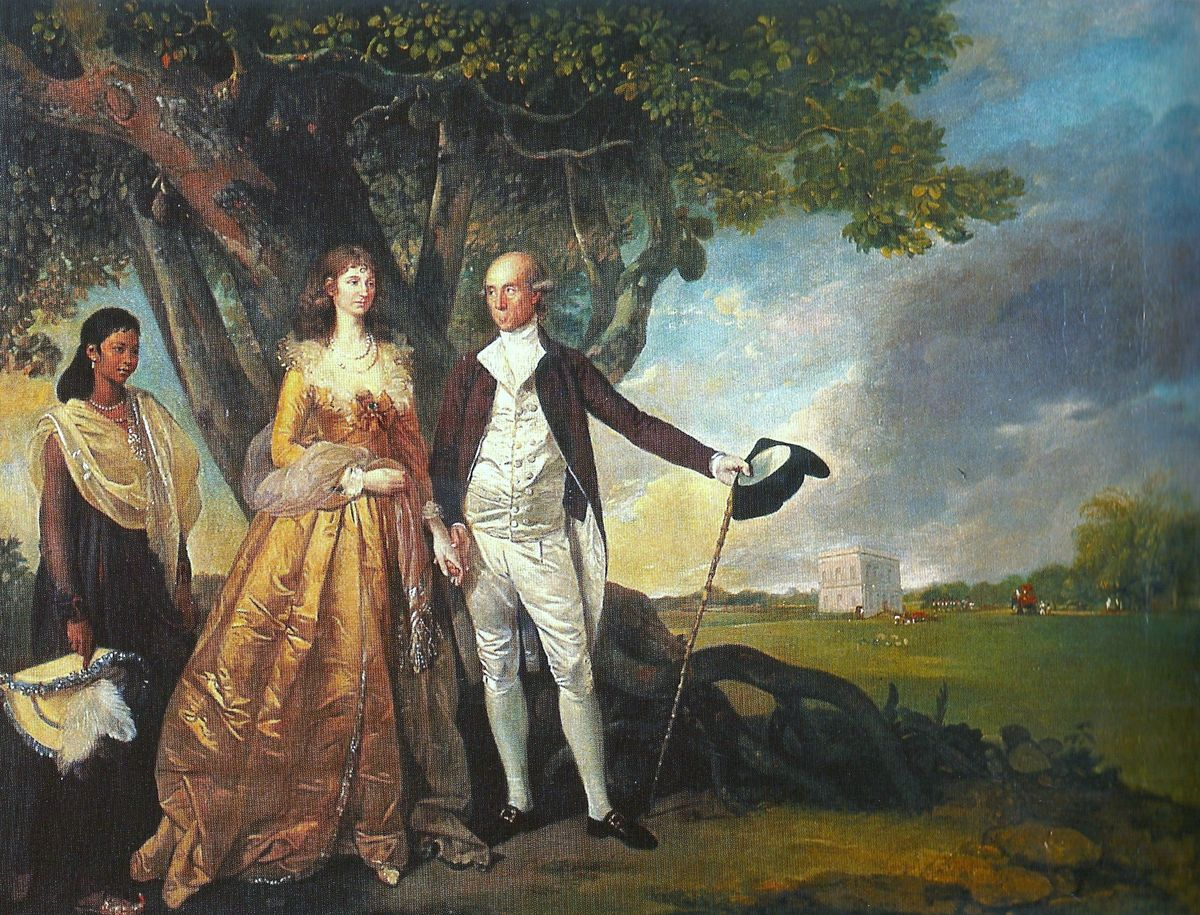
c. 1784 painting of Hastings with Marian in their garden at Alipore by Johan Zoffany

For a while, Hastings remained in Murshidabad and was even used by the Nawab as an intermediary; but, fearing for his life, he escaped to the island of Fulta, where several refugees from Calcutta had taken shelter. While there, he met, fell in love with, and married Mary Buchanan, the widow of Captain John Buchanan (one of the victims of the Black Hole of Calcutta). Shortly afterwards a British expedition from Madras under Robert Clive arrived to rescue them. Hastings served as a volunteer in Clive's forces as they retook Calcutta in January 1757. After this swift defeat, the Nawab urgently sought peace, and the war came to an end. Clive was impressed with Hastings when he met him and arranged for his return to Kasimbazar to resume his pre-war activities. Later in 1757, fighting resumed, leading to the Battle of Plassey, where Clive won a decisive victory over the Nawab. Siraj ud-Daulah was overthrown and replaced by his commander-in-chief Mir Jafar, who initiated policies favourable to the East India Company traders, before falling out with them and being overthrown.

== Rising status ==
In 1758, Hastings became the British resident in the Bengal capital of Murshidabad – a major step forward in his career – at the instigation of Clive. His role in the city was ostensibly that of an ambassador, but as Bengal came increasingly under the dominance of the East India Company, he was often given the task of issuing orders to the new Nawab on behalf of Clive and the Calcutta authorities. Hastings personally sympathised with Mir Jafar and regarded many of the demands placed on him by the company as excessive. Hastings had already developed a philosophy that was grounded in trying to establish a more understanding relationship with India's inhabitants and their rulers, and he often tried to mediate between the two sides.

During Mir Jafar's reign, the East India Company exerted an increasingly large role in the running of the region, and effectively took over the defence of Bengal against external invaders when Bengal's troops proved insufficient for the task. As he grew older, Mir Jafar became gradually less effective in ruling the state, and in 1760, EIC troops ousted him from power and replaced him with Mir Qasim. Hastings expressed his doubts to Calcutta over the move, believing they were honour-bound to support Mir Jafar, but his opinions were overruled. Hastings established a good relationship with the new Nawab and again had misgivings about the demands he relayed from his superiors. In 1761, he was recalled and appointed to the Calcutta council.

=== Conquest of Bengal ===
Hastings was personally angered when investigating trading abuses in Bengal. He alleged that some European and British-allied Indian merchants were taking advantage of the situation to enrich themselves personally. Persons travelling under the unauthorised protection of the British flag engaged in widespread fraud and illegal trading, knowing that local customs officials would be cowed into not interfering with them. Hastings felt this was bringing shame on Britain's reputation and urged the authorities in Calcutta to put an end to it. The Council considered his report but ultimately rejected Hastings' proposals. He was fiercely criticised by other members, many of whom had themselves profited from the trade.

Ultimately, little was done to stem the abuses, and Hastings began to consider quitting his post and returning to Britain. His resignation was only delayed by the outbreak of fresh fighting in Bengal. Once on the throne, Qasim proved increasingly independent in his actions, and he rebuilt Bengal's army by hiring European instructors and mercenaries who greatly improved the standard of his forces. He gradually felt more confident, and in 1764, when a dispute broke out in the settlement of Patna, he captured its British garrison and threatened to execute them if the East India Company responded militarily. When Calcutta dispatched troops anyway, Mir Qasim executed the hostages. British forces then went on the attack and won a series of battles culminating in the decisive Battle of Buxar in October 1764. After this, Mir Qasim fled into exile in Delhi, where he died in 1777. The Treaty of Allahabad (1765) gave the East India Company the right to collect taxes in Bengal on behalf of the Mughal emperor of that time Shah Alam.

Hastings resigned in December 1764 and sailed for Britain the following month. He left deeply saddened by the failure of the more moderate strategy that he had supported, but which had been rejected by the hawkish members of the Calcutta Council. Once he arrived in London, Hastings began spending far beyond his means. He stayed at fashionable addresses and had his picture painted by Joshua Reynolds even though, unlike many of his contemporaries, he had not amassed a fortune while in India. Eventually, having run up enormous debts, Hastings realised he needed to return to India to restore his finances, and applied to the East India Company for employment. His application was initially rejected as he had made many political enemies, including the powerful director Laurence Sulivan. Eventually, an appeal to Sulivan's rival Robert Clive secured Hastings the position of deputy ruler at the city of Madras. He sailed from Dover in March 1769. On the voyage on board, the Duke of Grafton became ill, and he was cared for by the German Baroness Marian von Imhoff (1749–1837) and her husband. He fell in love with the Baroness, and they began an affair, seemingly with her husband's consent. Hastings' first wife, Mary, had died in 1759, and he planned to marry the Baroness once she had obtained a divorce from her husband. The process took a long time and it was not until 1777 that news of the divorce came from Germany, and Hastings was finally able to marry her.

=== Madras and Calcutta ===
Hastings arrived in Madras shortly after the First Anglo-Mysore War of 1767–1769, when the forces of Hyder Ali had threatened the capture of the city. The Treaty of Madras (4 April 1769) ended the war but failed to settle the dispute, and three further Anglo-Mysore Wars followed (1780–1799). During his time at Madras, Hastings initiated reforms of trading practices which cut out the use of middlemen and benefited both the Company and the Indian labourers, but otherwise the period was relatively uneventful for him.

By this stage, Hastings shared Clive's view that the three major British presidencies (settlements) – Madras, Bombay and Calcutta – should be brought under single rule rather than being governed separately as they currently were. In 1772, he was appointed to be the governor of Calcutta, the most important of the presidencies. In Britain, moves were underway to reform the divided system of government and establish single rule across all of British-controlled regions in India, with its capital in Kolkata (Calcutta). Hastings became the first governor general in 1773.

While governor, Hastings launched a major crackdown on bandits operating in Bengal, which proved largely successful. He also faced the severe Bengal famine, which resulted in between two and ten million deaths.

== Governor-General ==
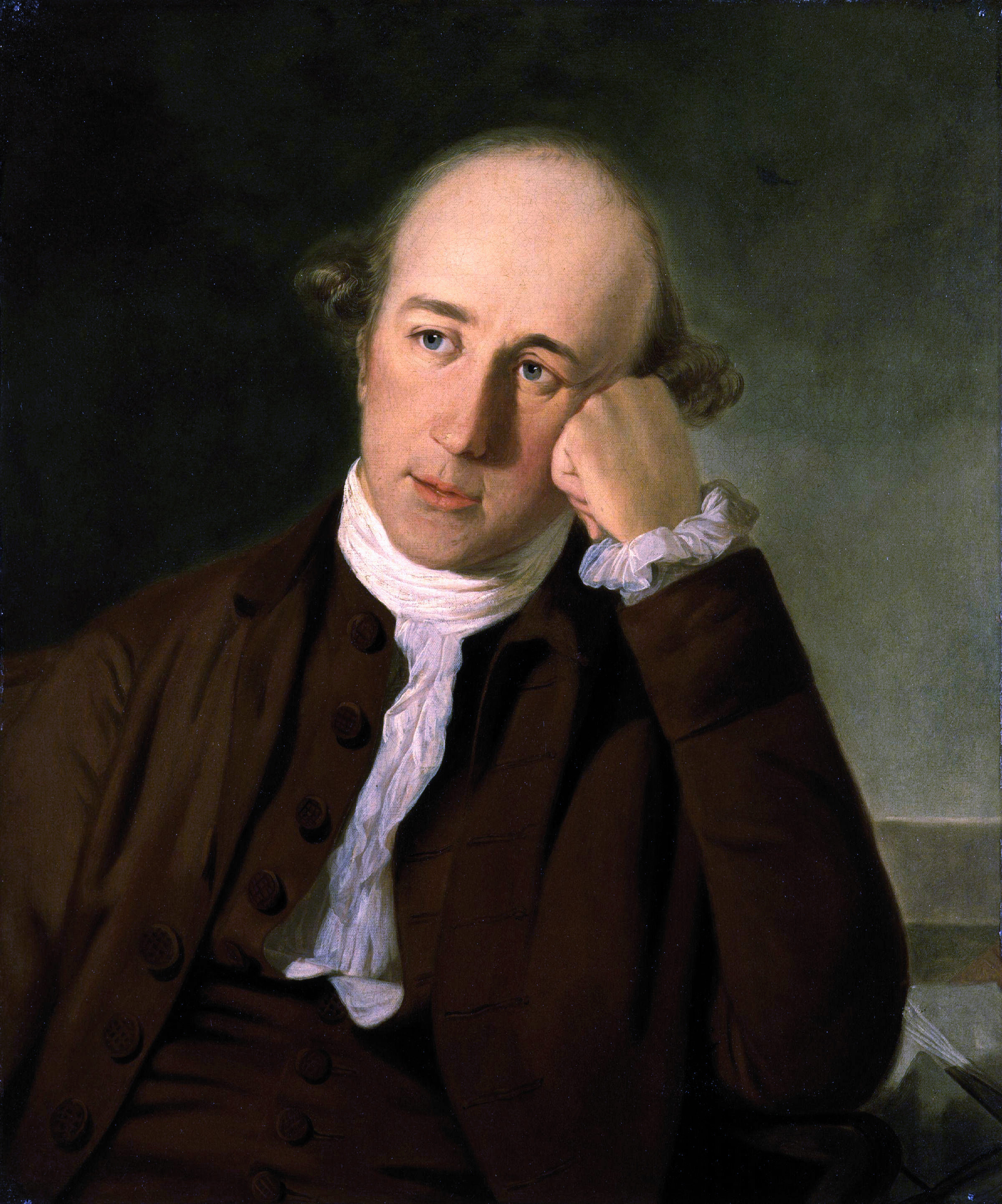
Portrait of Hastings by Tilly Kettle

The Regulating Act 1773 brought the presidencies of Madras and Bombay under Bengal's control. It raised Hastings from Governor to the new post of Governor-General, but limited his power by making the governor-general one member of a five-man Supreme Council. This was so confusingly structured that it was difficult to tell what constitutional position Hastings actually held.

According to the Scottish historian William Dalrymple:

He got quickly to work, beginning the process of turning the EIC into an administrative service. Hastings' first major change was to move all the functions of government from Murshidabad to Calcutta ... Throughout 1773, Hastings worked with extraordinary energy. He unified currency systems, ordered the codification of Hindu laws and digests of Muslim law books, reformed the tax and customs system, fixed land revenue and stopped the worst oppression being carried out on behalf of private traders by the local agents. He created an efficient postal service, backed a proper cartographical survey of India by James Rennell and built a series of public granaries, including the great Gola at Patna, to make sure the famine of 1770-71 was never repeated ... Underlying all Hastings' work was a deep respect for the land he had lived in since his teens ... Hastings genuinely liked India, and by the time he became Governor spoke not only good Bengali and Urdu but also fluent court and literary Persian.

In 1774, Hastings assumed control of the East India Company's opium monopoly. The same year, he sent Company troops to support the wazir of Oudh, Shuja-ud-Daula, in a campaign against the Rohillas, a people of Afghan origin. The Company troops were paid by the wazir for their assistance. This short campaign, while enlarging the company's main ally in northern India, was the first of several wars that harmed Hastings's reputation.

=== War in India ===
In 1777, during the American War of Independence (1775–1783), the Americans had captured a British field army at the Battle of Saratoga during the Saratoga campaign. This emboldened the French to sign a military alliance with the new United States of America and declare war on Great Britain. The French concentrated in the Caribbean islands and in India.

The presidencies of Madras and Bombay became involved in serious quarrels with the greatest of the native states. Madras with the formidable Hyder Ali of Mysore and with the Nizam of Hyderabad, and Bombay with the Marathas. France sent a fleet under Admiral Pierre André de Suffren. The combination meant Hastings faced a formidable challenge, with only Oudh as an ally. In six years of intense and confused fighting, from 1779 to 1784, Hastings sent one army marching across India to help Bombay, and another to Madras. His greatest achievement was in breaking up the hostile coalition. By 1782 he made peace with the Marathas. The French fleet had been repeatedly delayed. Suffren finally arrived in 1782 to discover that the Indian coalition had fallen apart, that Hastings had captured all the French ports, and Suffren could achieve nothing. When the wars ended in 1784, British rule in India had not changed, but the French position was now much weaker. The East India Company now had an efficient system in operation. However, Hastings's multiple wartime operations needed large sums of money and London sent nothing. His methods of using the local treasuries later became the main line of attack in the impeachment brought against him.

=== Bhutan and Tibet ===
In 1773, Hastings responded to an appeal for help from the Raja of the princely state of Cooch Behar to the north of Bengal, whose territory had been invaded by Zhidar, the Druk Desi of Bhutan the previous year. Hastings agreed to help on the condition that Cooch Behar recognise British sovereignty. The Raja agreed and with the help of British troops they pushed the Bhutanese out of the Duars and into the foothills in 1773.

The Druk Desi returned to face civil war at home. His opponent, Jigme Senge, the regent for the seven-year-old Shabdrung (the Bhutanese equivalent of the Dalai Lama), had supported popular discontent. Zhidar was unpopular for his corvée tax (he sought unreasonably to rebuild a major dzong in one year), as well as for his overtures to the Manchu emperors, who threatened Bhutanese independence. Zhidar was soon overthrown and forced to flee to Tibet, where he was imprisoned, and a new Druk Desi, Kunga Rinchen, was installed in his place. Meanwhile, the Sixth Panchen Lama, who had imprisoned Zhidar, interceded on behalf of the Bhutanese with a letter to Hastings, imploring him to cease hostilities in return for friendship. Hastings saw the opportunity to establish relations with both the Tibetans and the Bhutanese and wrote a letter to the Panchen Lama proposing "a general treaty of amity and commerce between Tibet and Bengal".

In February 1782, news reached the headquarters of the EIC in Calcutta of the reincarnation of the Panchen Lama. Hastings proposed sending a mission to Tibet with a message of congratulations, designed to strengthen amicable relations established by Bogle on his earlier visit. With the assent of the EIC Court of Directors, Samuel Turner was appointed chief of the Tibet mission on 9 January 1783 with fellow EIC employee Samuel Davis as "Draftsman & Surveyor". Turner returned to the Governor-General's camp at Patna in 1784 where he reported he had been unable to visit the Tibetan capital at Lhasa, but received a promise that merchants sent there from India would be encouraged.

Turner was instructed to obtain a pair of yaks on his travels, which he duly did. They were transported to Hastings's menagerie in Calcutta and on the Governor-General's return to England, the yaks went too, although only the male survived the difficult sea voyage. Noted artist George Stubbs subsequently painted the animal's portrait as The Yak of Tartary and in 1854 it went on to appear, albeit stuffed, at The Great Exhibition at Crystal Palace in London.

Hastings's return to England ended any further efforts to engage in diplomacy with Tibet.

== Impeachment ==
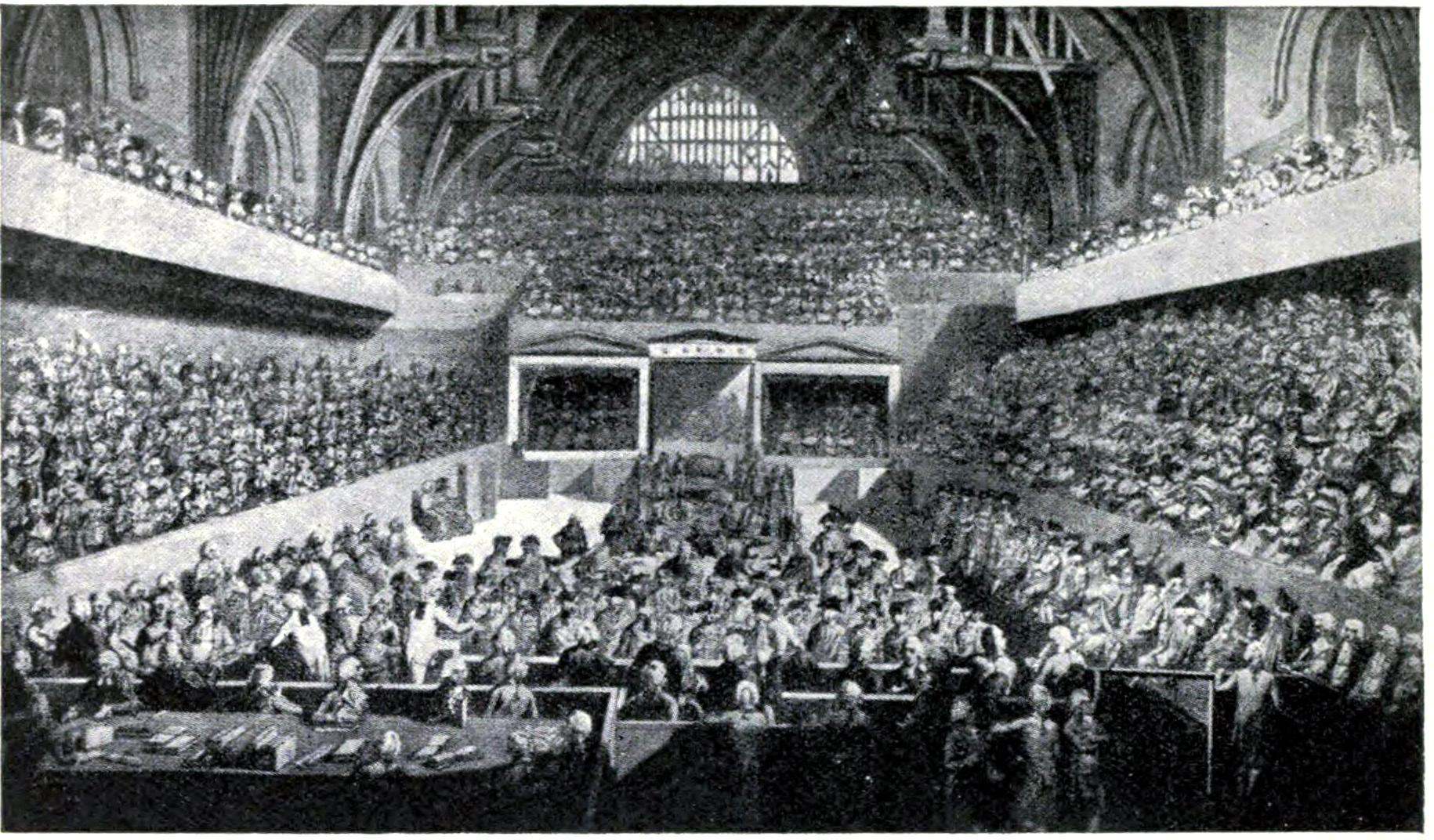
The trial of Warren Hastings in Westminster Hall, 1788

In 1785, after 10 years of service, during which he helped extend and regularise the nascent British rule created by Clive of India, Hastings resigned. He was replaced by the Earl Cornwallis; Cornwallis served as Commander-in-Chief of British India and Governor of the Presidency of Fort William, also known as the Bengal Presidency.

On return to England, Hastings was impeached in the House of Commons for alleged crimes in India, notably embezzlement, extortion and coercion, and an alleged judicial killing of Maharaja Nandakumar. At first thought unlikely to succeed, the prosecution was managed by MPs including Edmund Burke, encouraged by Sir Philip Francis, whom Hastings had wounded during a duel in India, Charles James Fox and Richard Brinsley Sheridan. When the charges of the indictment were read, the 20 counts took Edmund Burke two full days to read. According to historian Mithi Mukherjee, the trial instituted debate between two radically opposed visions of empire – one based on ideas of power and conquest in pursuit of the exclusive national interests of the coloniser, and one represented by Burke, of sovereignty based on a recognition of the rights of the colonised.

Following the indictment by the House of Commons, Hastings was tried by his peers in the House of Lords; the trial started on 13 February 1788 and continued for 148 days of hearings over a period of seven years. These hearings continued at great personal cost to Hastings, who complained that he was being bankrupted by the cost of defending himself. He is rumoured once to have said that the punishment would have been less extreme had he pleaded guilty. The House of Lords acquitted him of all charges on 24 April 1795. The Company subsequently compensated him with £4,000 annually, retroactive to the date he returned to England, but did not reimburse his legal fees, which he claimed to have been £70,000. He collected the stipend for nearly 29 years. Throughout the years of the trial, Hastings lived in considerable style at his leased town house, Somerset House, Park Lane. He subsequently sold the lease at auction for £9,450.

Among many who supported him in print was the pamphleteer Ralph Broome. Others disturbed by the perceived injustice of the proceedings included Frances Burney.

Letters and journals of Jane Austen and her family, who knew Hastings, show that they followed the trial closely.

== Later life ==
Hastings' supporters from the Edinburgh East India Club and a number of other gentlemen from India gave a reportedly "elegant entertainment" for Hastings when he visited Edinburgh. There was a toast to "prosperity to our settlements in India" and a wish that "the virtue and talents which preserved them be ever remembered with gratitude."

In 1788, Hastings bought for £54,000 an estate at Daylesford, Worcestershire, including the site of the Hastings family's medieval seat. Thereafter he remodelled the house to designs by Samuel Pepys Cockerell with classical and Indian decoration and gardens landscaped by John Davenport. In 1801, he was elected a Fellow of the Royal Society.

In 1816, he rebuilt the Norman church, where he was buried two years later. Despite substantial compensation from the East India Company, Hastings was technically insolvent on his death.

== Administrative ethos and legacy ==
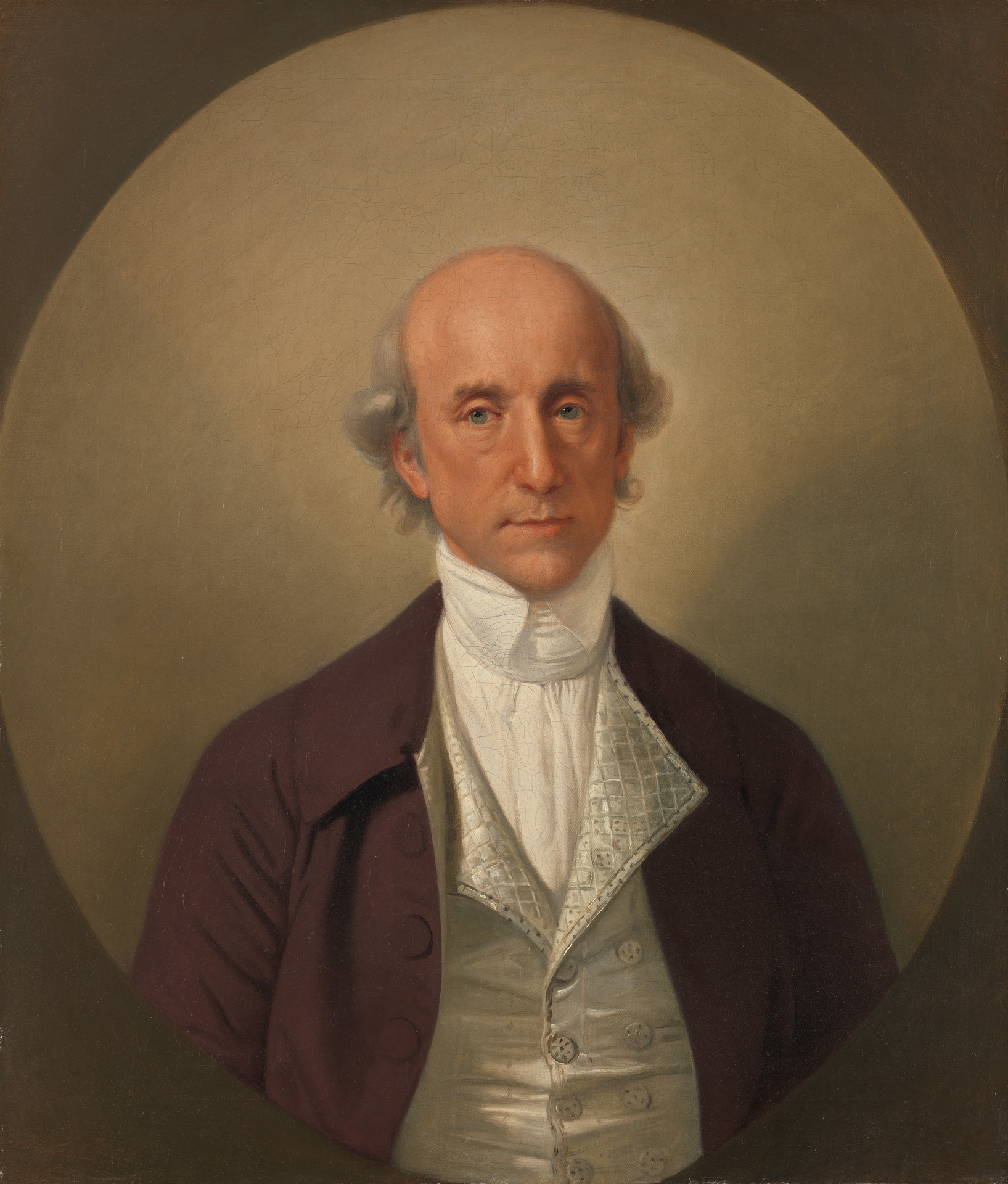
Hastings painted by Johann Zoffany, 1783–1784

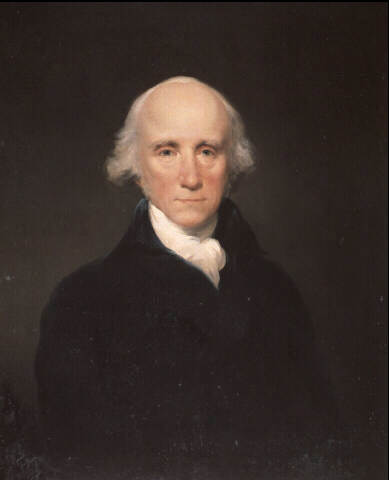
Hastings in the late 18th century, as painted by Lemuel Francis Abbott

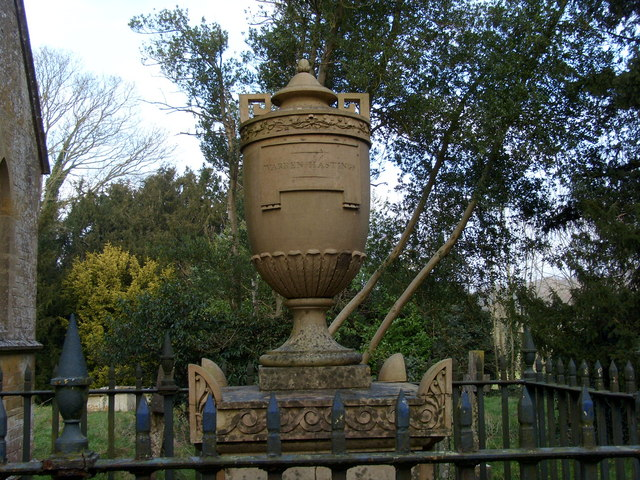
His memorial in Daylesford churchyard

In the last quarter of the 18th century, many senior administrators realised that to govern Indian society it was essential to learn its various religious, social, and legal customs and precedents. The importance of such knowledge to the colonial government was in Hastings' mind when he remarked in 1784, in his introduction to the English translation of the Bhagavad Gita by Wilkins:

Every accumulation of knowledge and especially such as is obtained by social communication with people over whom we exercise dominion founded on the right of conquest, is useful to the state... it attracts and conciliates distant affections; it lessens the weight of the chain by which the natives are held in subjection; and it imprints on the hearts of our countrymen the sense of obligation and benevolence.... Every instance which brings their real character... home to observation will impress us with a more generous sense of feeling for their natural rights, and teach us to estimate them by the measure of our own. But such instances can only be obtained in their writings: and these will survive when the British dominion in India shall have long ceased to exist, and when the sources which once yielded of wealth and power are lost to remembrance.

During Hastings' term as governor-general, much administrative precedent was set, which profoundly shaped later attitudes towards the government of British India. Hastings had great respect for the ancient scripture of Hinduism and set the British position on governance as one of looking back to the earliest precedents possible. This allowed Brahmin advisors to mould the law, as no Briton thoroughly understood Sanskrit until Sir William Jones, and even then, a literal translation was of little use: it needed to be elucidated by religious commentators well versed in the lore and its application. This approach accentuated the Hindu caste system and to an extent the frameworks of other religions, which had at least in recent centuries been somewhat more flexibly applied. So British influence on the fluid social structure of India can largely be seen as a solidification of the privileges of the Hindu caste system through the influence of exclusively high-caste Hindu scholars advising the British on their laws. Where British translators or interpreters read in the Arthashastra a caste system in India, the actual wording speaks of varna and jati: skin-colour and birth, i.e. clan, and it speaks of the four societal classes, not castes: from upper-class Brahmin to lower-class Shudra.

In 1781, Hastings founded Madrasa 'Aliya at Calcutta (transformed in 2007 into Aliah University by the Government of West Bengal). In 1784, he supported the foundation of the Bengal Asiatic Society, now the Asiatic Society of Bengal, by the oriental scholar Sir William Jones. This became a storehouse for information on the subcontinent and has remained in various institutional guises to the present day. Hastings' legacy as an administrator has been somewhat dualistic: as governor, he instituted reforms that would change the path India followed in subsequent years, but he retained the distinction of being also the "architect of British India and the one ruler of British India to whom the creation of such an entity was anathema."

== Legacy ==
The city of Hastings, New Zealand, and the Melbourne outer suburb of Hastings, Victoria, Australia, were named after him. There is also a road and the neighbourhood of Hastings, Kolkata in India named after him.

"Hastings" is the name of one of the four schoolhouses in La Martiniere Calcutta (Kolkata). It is represented by the colour red. "Hastings" is also the name of one of the four schoolhouses in Bishop Westcott Girls' School, Ranchi, again represented by the colour red. "Hastings" is a senior wing house at St Paul's School, Darjeeling, India, where all the senior wing houses are named after Anglo-Indian colonial figures.

RIMS Warren Hastings was a Royal Indian Marine troopship built by the Barrow Shipbuilding Co. and launched on 18 April 1893. The ship struck a rock and was wrecked off the coast of Réunion on the night of 14 January 1897.

== Literature ==
Hastings took an interest in seeing the Bhagavad Gita translated into English. His efforts led to a first translation by Charles Wilkins appearing in 1785. He wrote the introduction to it which appeared on 4 October 1784 in Benares.

"Warren Hastings and His Bull", a short story by the Indian writer Uday Prakash, was adapted for stage under the same title by the director Arvind Gaur. It presents Hastings's interaction with traditional India in a work of socio-economic political satire.

A short story by the Hindi author Shivprasad Singh 'Rudra' Kashikeya called Bahti Ganga features Chait Singh, then Raja of Banaras, in conflict with Hastings, who is imprisoned by the Raja, but escapes, though ordinary people of the city make fun of him.

The Hastings career is much discussed in the historical mystery novel, Secrets in the Stones, by Tessa Harris.

Hastings is named in Book 5 of George Eliot's novel Middlemarch, where his greed for Daylesford is compared to the character Joshua Rigg's greed for money.

Hastings was rumoured to be the biological father of Eliza de Feuillide, the daughter of Philadelphia Austen Hancock and a cousin of Jane Austen. Some scholars have seen parallels between Hastings and Colonel Brandon in Austen's Sense and Sensibility: both left for India at age 17; both may have had illegitimate daughters named Eliza; both participated in a duel. Linda Robinson Walker argues that Hastings "haunts Sense and Sensibility in the character of Colonel Brandon."

== See also ==
- Company rule in India
- Mughal Empire
- Shah Alam II

== Bibliography ==
- Dalrymple, William (2019). The Anarchy: The East India Company, Corporate Violence, and the Pillage of an Empire. Blooomsbury Publishing. pp. 238–239. ISBN 978-1-63557-395-4. excerpt
- Alfred Mervyn Davies, Strange Destiny: A Biography of Warren Hastings (G. P. Putnam's, 1935)
- Keith Feiling, Warren Hastings (Macmillan, 1954)
- Suresh Chandra Ghosh, The Social Condition of the British Community in Bengal: 1757–1800 (Brill, 1970)
- Philip Lawson, The East India Company: A History (Routledge, 2014)
- P. J. Marshall, The Impeachment of Warren Hastings (Oxford University Press, 1965)
- P. J. Marshall, "Hastings, Warren (1732–1818)", Oxford Dictionary of National Biography (Oxford University Press, 2004); online edn, Oct 2008 accessed 11 Nov 2014
- Penderel Moon, Warren Hastings and British India (Macmillan, 1949) online
- Patrick Turnbull, Warren Hastings. (New English Library, 1975)
- Younghusband, Francis (1910). India and Tibet: a history of the relations which have subsisted between the two countries from the time of Warren Hastings to 1910; with a particular account of the mission to Lhasa of 1904. London: John Murray.

=== Primary sources ===
- G. W. Forrest, ed., Selections from the State Papers of the Governors-General of India: Warren Hastings (2 vols.), Blackwell's, Oxford (1910)
- Sir George Forrest (1892). The Administration of Warren Hastings, 1772-1785. Calcutta: Office of the Superintendent of Government Print.
- G. R. Gleig (1841). Memoirs of the Life of Warren Hastings. Vol. I. London: Rich. Bentley.
- G. R. Gleig (1841). Memoirs of the Life of Warren Hastings. Vol. II. London: Rich. Bentley.
- G. R. Gleig (1841). Memoirs of the Life of Warren Hastings. Vol. III. London: Rich. Bentley.
- Warren Hastings (1782). A Narrative of the Insurrection which Happened in the Zemeedary of Banaris in August 1781. Calcutta: The Governor General.
- Warren Hastings (1782). A Narrative of the Late Transactions at Benares. London: J. Debrett.
- Warren Hastings (1786). Memoirs Relative to the State of India. London: J. Murray.
- Warren Hastings (1905). Sydney C. Grier (ed.). The Letters of Warren Hastings to His Wife. London: W. Blackwood.
- Sir Charles Lawson (1895). The Private Life of Warren Hastings: First Governor-General of India. London: S. Sonnenschein.
- Sir Charles Lawson (1897). The Private Life of Warren Hastings: press reviews. Madras: Madras Mail Press.
- Lionel James Trotter (1892). Warren Hastings. Oxford: Clarendon Press.

Government offices
New creation	Governor-General of India; 1773–1785	Succeeded by Sir John Macpherson, acting
