= Matricide =

Act of killing one's own mother

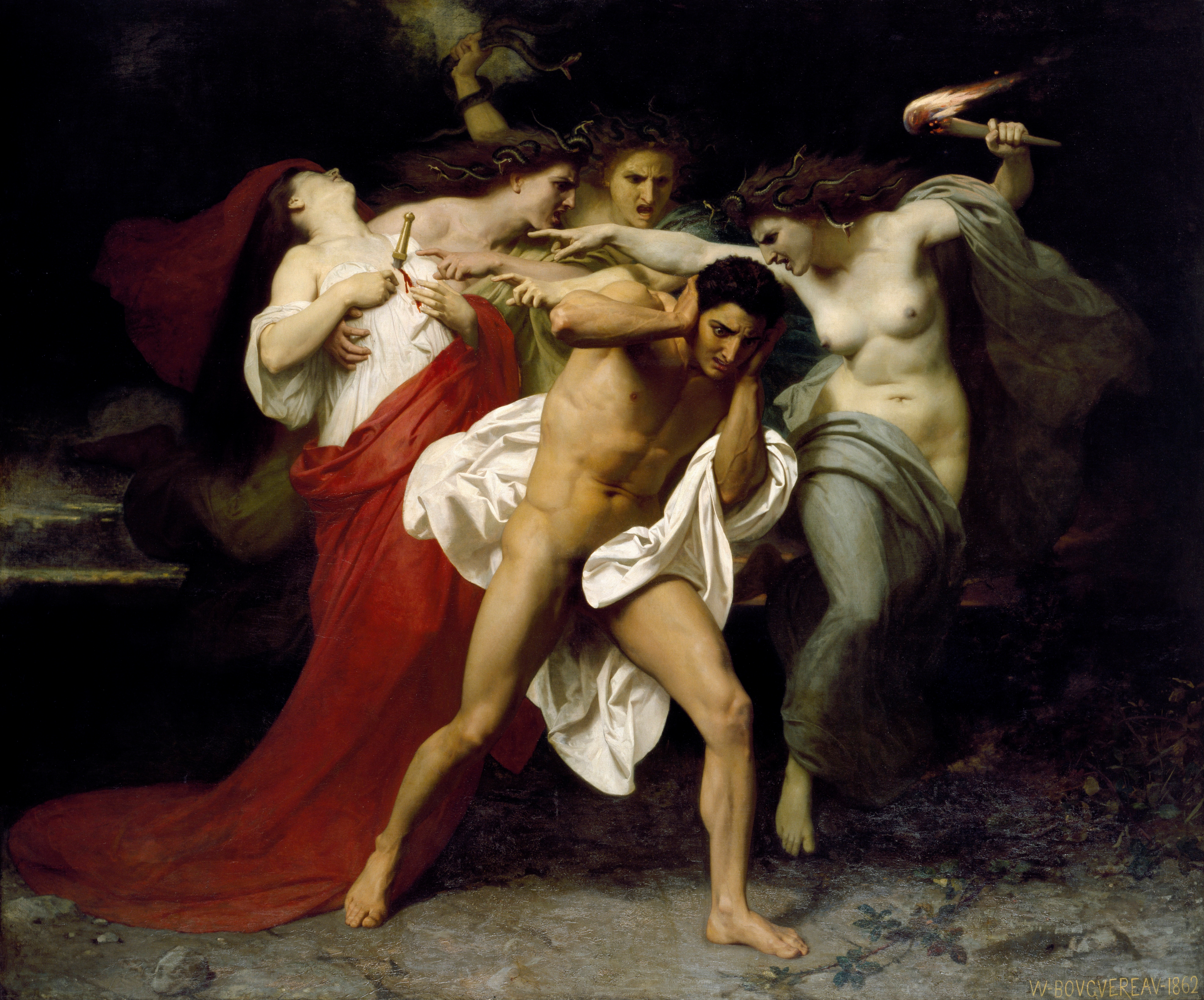
Orestes Pursued by the Furies by William-Adolphe Bouguereau. Orestes is tormented by the Furies for the murder of his mother Clytemnestra.

Matricide (or maternal homicide) is the act of killing one's own mother. The word matricide is derived from the Latin word mātricida, from māter (mother) and the suffix -cida (cutter or killer). Matricide is a sub-form of parricide. Throughout human history, matricide has been culturally considered one of the most heinous crimes.

Matricide is a rare form of murder, accounting for around 0.68% of homicides. In the United States, matricide represented less than 2% of homicides committed between 1976 and 1998. In the western world, matricide is less common than patricide, which accounts for less than 4% of murders in North America and Europe.

In the majority of cases, matricide is committed by adult sons, with psychotic disorders, most often schizophrenia. Matricides are usually not premeditated and take place in the mother's bedroom following a trivial dispute. Relationships between perpetrators of matricide and their mothers are usually ambivalent with frequent conflicts, typically described by perpetrators as a hostile-dependent relationship with a domineering mother.

Male perpetrators of matricide, regardless of age, most often act alone. Daughters under the age of 18 are the least common perpretrators of matricide and female juvenile perpetrators usually kill their mothers with an older male accomplice.

The killing of stepmothers by stepchildren represent only 5% of overall matricides. In these cases, perpetrators are usually younger, with 64% being under the age of 25, compared to 35% of perpetrators in matricides of biological mothers.

In Israel, matricide accounted for 20-33% of all femicides in 2025.

== Known or suspected matricides ==
- Amastris, queen of Heraclea, was drowned by her two sons in 284 BC.
- Cleopatra III was assassinated in 101 BC by order of her son, Ptolemy X Alexander I, for her conspiracy.
- Ptolemy XI of Egypt had his wife, Berenice III, murdered shortly after their wedding in 80 BC. She was also his stepmother and half-sister.
- In AD 59, the Roman Emperor Nero is said to have ordered the murder of his mother Agrippina the Younger, supposedly because she was conspiring against him.
- Mary Lamb, the mentally ill sister of essayist Charles Lamb, killed their invalid mother Elizabeth on 22 September 1796.
- Sidney Harry Fox killed his mother Rosaline on 23 October 1929 to gain from her insurance. He was executed by hanging in 1930.
- Battle of Okinawa, 1945: There are accounts in which Okinawan civilians killed their mothers to prevent them from being captured, raped, tortured, and/or killed by the invading American forces.
- The Parker–Hulme murder case of 1954, in which 16-year-old Pauline Parker bludgeoned her mother Honorah to death with the assistance of Parker's 15-year-old friend Juliet Hulme. This case was dramatized in the 1994 film Heavenly Creatures.
- Jack Gilbert Graham perpetrated the bombing of United Air Lines Flight 629 by planting explosives into the suitcase of his mother Gloria, who was killed onboard along with 43 others
- Henry Lee Lucas killed his mother Nellie in 1960 by stabbing her in the neck.
- Charles Whitman killed his mother Margaret and his wife shortly before committing the University of Texas tower shooting.
- John List murdered his mother Alma, as well as his wife and his three children, on November 9, 1971. He then evaded capture for 18 years until June 1, 1989, when he was apprehended after an episode of America's Most Wanted aired prompting his neighbor to call the police after recognizing him from the episode. On May 1, 1990, he was sentenced to five consecutive life terms in prison.
- Barbara Daly Baekeland was murdered by her son Antony Baekeland on November 11, 1972. She had allegedly raped him in order to "cure" his homosexuality. Savage Grace is a book and a movie based on this event.
- Edmund Kemper killed his mother Clarnell Strandberg and one of her friends on April 20, 1973. He had previously been convicted for killing his maternal grandparents and killed six female hitchhikers in the months preceding the final murders
- Ronald DeFeo Jr. killed his mother Louise, his father, and his four siblings during the 1974 Amityville murders, the aftermath of which inspired several horror works
- Bradford Bishop allegedly bludgeoned his mother Lobelia, as well as his wife and three children to death on March 1, 1976. He was indicted for murders and remains at large.
- Jim Gordon, a session musician who played drums with Eric Clapton band Derek and the Dominos, bludgeoned his mother Osa with a hammer and then stabbed her to death with a butcher's knife on June 3, 1983. In May 1984 he was sentenced to sixteen years to life in prison.
- Campo Elías Delgado killed his mother Rita and 28 others during the 1986 Pozzetto massacre.
- Susan Cabot, 1950s actress, was beaten to death in 1986 at her Hollywood home by her son Timothy Roman. He was convicted of involuntary manslaughter.
- Michael Ryan murdered his mother Dorothy during the 1987 Hungerford massacre
- David Brom murdered his mother Paulette, along with his father, younger brother, and sister, on February 18, 1988
- Peter Lundin murdered his mother Anna around April 1, 1991 in North Carolina. After serving his prison sentence, he moved to Denmark, where he murdered his girlfriend and her two children.
- Lyle and Erik Menendez killed their mother Kitty and their father in August 20, 1989.
- Luke Woodham killed his mother Mary Ann in October 1, 1997 before killing two more and wounding seven others in the 1997 Pearl High School shooting.
- Rehman Dakait is said to have killed his own mother.
- Kip Kinkel killed his mother Faith and his father before killing two fellow students in the 1998 Thurston High School shooting
- I. Kathleen Hagen, a prominent urologist, killed her mother Idella and her father in August 2000 and was acquitted on the grounds of insanity.
- Yukio Yamaji killed his mother on July 29, 2000. After his release, he raped and murdered two sisters in 2005. He was executed by hanging in 2009.
- Dipendra of Nepal was identified as the perpetrator in the Nepalese royal massacre, in which his mother Queen Aiswarya, father, brother, and sister, were killed. Dipendra died days later following a coma for a gunshot wound to the head. Conspiracies and controversy surrounds this claim.
- Erika di Nardo killed her mother Susanna Cassini and younger brother during the Novi Ligure murder on 21 February 2001.
- Sef Gonzales killed his mother Mary, as well as his father and sister on 10 July 2001.
- Sarah Marie Johnson was convicted in the murder of her parents, Diane and Alan Scott Johnson, on September 2, 2003.
- Daniel Petric fatally shot his parents, Susan and Mark Petric, on October 20, 2007.
- Erin Caffey and three other teenagers organized the Caffey family murders, killing her mother Penny and two younger brothers on March 1, 2008.
- Michael Kenneth McLendon began the Geneva County shootings by killing his mother Lisa at their home in Alabama, killing nine others before committing suicide
- Joanne Witt was murdered by her teenaged daughter Tylar and Tylar's boyfriend Steven Colver in June 11, 2009
- Nikki Whitehead was killed by her twin daughters Jasmiyah Kaneesha Whitehead and Tasmiyah Janeesha Whitehead on January 13, 2010.
- Bich Pan was killed in a home invasion organized by her daughter Jennifer, during which four accomplices shot Bich and her husband Hann. Jennifer Pan, along with three of the four accomplices, were sentenced to life imprisonment with the possibility of parole after 25 years.
- Tyler Hadley killed his parents Blake and Mary-Jo Hadley on July 16, 2011. He was sentenced to life in prison.
- Trey Sesler killed his mother Rhonda, his father and younger brother during the 2012 Waller killings. He told investigators his plan was to commit a school shooting at a near-by high school and that he killed his family so they would not be ashamed.
- Sujay Solomon Sutherson, who had a history of paranoid schizophrenia, killed his mother Mallika Jesudasan on 27 May 2012. He was sentenced to life imprisonment for manslaughter in 2015 and later died in prison in 2022
- Adam Lanza shot and killed his mother Nancy Lanza at their home before committing the Sandy Hook Elementary School shooting, killing 20 children and 6 other adults before killing himself on December 14, 2012.
- David Rodenbarger murdered his mother Michelle Haskins and 6-year-old sister Jillian Haskins in February 2013. Rodenbarger suffered from paranoid schizophrenia and died of suicide in 2020 while incarcerated.
- Dante, Paroy and Ibrahim Amil from Ampatuan, Maguindanao, Philippines who butchered and ate their 56-year-old mother Akrima in January 29, 2014. Hours later, the brothers, aged 35, 21 and 18 respectively, surrendered voluntarily to the police who arrived at their farm. Neighbors suspected that they were under the influence of drugs during the incident, yet local officials and investigators said that superstitious elders in the municipality believe that the Amil brothers were possessed by evil spirits. Such superstitions are forbidden in Islam, the religion of most inhabitants of the municipality. They had been subjected to rituals by a local shaman. There is a story that the brothers are associated with a cursed clan where ghouls came from, as the legend says that Ampatuan is a haven of ghouls.
- Tine Rømer Holtegaard was killed by her 15-year-old daughter Lisa Borch and her 29-year-old boyfriend Bakhtiar Mohammed Abdullah in the Kvissel murder on 8 October 2014
- Ashlee Martinson killed her mother Jennifer Ayers and her stepfather on March 7, 2015. She was sentenced to 23 years in prison.
- Dee Dee Blanchard was killed by her 23 year-old daughter Gypsy Rose Blanchard and her 26 year-old boyfriend Nicholas Godejohn on June 10, 2015. Dee Dee had falsely claimed that Gypsy had several disabilities and forced her to undergo unnecessary treatment as a form of medical child abuse.
- Robert and Michael Bever killed their mother April, along with their father and three younger siblings, during the Broken Arrow murders on July 22, 2015.
- Jake Davison killed his mother Maxine and four others before killing himself during the 2021 Plymouth shooting.
- Krešimir Pahoki killed his mother Anku Papp along with five other residents of a nursing home during the Daruvar shooting on July 22, 2024.
- Jesse Van Rootselaar shot and killed her mother Jennifer Strang and younger brother, killing six and injuring 27 at Tumbler Ridge Secondary School before committing suicide during the 2026 Tumbler Ridge shooting.
- Jay Mamari, 39, of Kabacan, North Cotabato, Philippines, stabbed his 59-year-old mother Floresma to death after a heated argument.
- Rhea Hormiguera, a 46-year-old school teacher, was bludgeoned to death by her 15-year-old son, who confessed his crime, following a heated argument after she reprimanded her son for repeated cutting classes, on October 30, 2026, in Panglao, Bohol, Philippines. The victim's body was found in the school's septic tank the following day, where the boy dumped after the incident he made four times using a hammer to take his mother's life. Investigators found out that the he had a Roblox account but have yet to establish a connection between the game and the crime. The boy was then taken under custody of social workers.

== See also ==
- List of types of killing
  - Avunculicide, the killing of one's uncle
  - Filicide, the killing of one's child
  - Fratricide, the killing of one's brother
  - Infanticide, the killing of an infant
  - Mariticide, the killing of one's husband
  - Nepoticide, the killing of one's nephew
  - Parricide, the killing of one's parents or another close relative
  - Patricide, the killing of one's father
  - Prolicide, the killing of one's offspring
  - Sororicide, the killing of one's sister
  - Uxoricide, the killing of one's wife
  - Suicide, the killing of oneself
  - "law concerning royal matricide" with the Edo people of the Kingdom of Benin, see Idia, the Iyoba of Benin
