= Samuel Adams Green =

American art dealer (1940–2011)

Sam Green
- Green by Cecil Beaton
- Born: Samuel McGee Green; May 20, 1940; Boston, Massachusetts, U.S.
- Died: March 4, 2011 (aged 70); New York City, U.S.
- Other name: Samuel Adams Green
- Occupations: Curator; art dealer; historical preservationist
- Partner(s): Barbara Daly Baekeland (1969–1969)

Samuel "Sam" Adams Green (born Samuel McGee Green; May 20, 1940 – March 4, 2011) was an American curator, art dealer, and arts administrator. He was an early advocate of Pop art and served as director of the Institute of Contemporary Art in Philadelphia and as a cultural adviser to New York City mayor John Lindsay. Green had notable friendships with artists and cultural figures including Andy Warhol, Cecil Beaton, John Lennon, Yoko Ono, and Greta Garbo. He devoted much of his career to the preservation of historic and sacred sites, and he founded the Landmarks Foundation in 1997.

== Early life ==
Samuel McGee Green was born in Boston, Massachusetts on May 20, 1940. Green would later go by Samuel Adams Green and claim to be a descendant of Samuel Adams, one of the Founding Fathers of the United States.

Green grew up in an academic environment and developed an early interest in art and architecture. His father, Samuel Magee Green, served as director of the New England Historical Society and as dean of fine arts at Wesleyan University. His cousin was Philadelphia art collector Henry Plumer McIlhenny. He attended the Rhode Island School of Design in Providence, but left after three semesters and moved to New York City, where he began working in the city's contemporary art galleries.

== Art career ==
=== Early career ===
At the age of 22, Green was introduced to the avant-garde art dealer Richard Bellamy, owner of the Green Gallery on 57th Street. Bellamy was amused by the coincidence of their surnames and hired Green to work at the gallery's front desk in 1963.

In 1963, artist Andy Warhol, visited the Green Gallery and mistook him for a member of the gallery owner's family because of their shared surname. The encounter began a friendship that continued throughout Warhol's career. Green recognized the potential of Warhol's emerging Pop art and subsequently became an important advocate for his work, while Warhol gained access through Green to collectors and members of New York's social and cultural circles. Around this time, Green appeared in Warhol's experimental films Batman Dracula (1964) and Soap Opera (1964).

Green also became acquainted with collectors Burton and Emily Tremaine, through whom he gained access to works by leading contemporary artists. After less than six months at the Green Gallery, Green arranged the loan of more than 50 contemporary artworks for an exhibition at the Davison Art Center at Wesleyan University in 1964. Through the influence of his father, Green secured the exhibition space and installed works by artists including Tom Wesselmann and Yayoi Kusama. Wesselmann's Great American Nude #39 was displayed above a Boston sideboard, while Kusama's Ten Guest Table, a dining table and chairs covered with phallic forms, replaced the Regency furniture normally displayed in the room.

=== Institute of Contemporary Art ===
In 1964, Green became director of the Institute of Contemporary Art (ICA) at the University of Pennsylvania in Philadelphia. That year he organized a major survey of Warhol's work, held from October 8 to November 21, 1965. The exhibition is notable for being Warhol's first solo museum exhibition. Green promoted the show as a large-scale cultural event, distributing thousands of invitations featuring Warhol's S&H Green Stamps. On the opening night, Warhol and his superstar Edie Sedgwick were mobbed by frenzied crowd and had to be helped out of the building.

Green wrote the foreword to John Rublowsky's 1965 book Pop Art, in which he described the movement as a "valued expression of our time."

After three years, in 1967 having been refused permission to organize a campus wide sculpture exhibition at the University of Pennsylvania, Green "abandoned the philistines" and created an exhibition in Philadelphia that included works by Barnett Newman, Tony Smith, and Philip Johnson. The resultant success allowed him to return to New York City's art scene as an acknowledged master of contemporary art installation.

=== New York cultural adviser ===
After leaving the ICA, Green was appointed a cultural adviser to New York City mayor John Lindsay. In October 1967, Green and Doris Freedman organized and curated Sculpture in Environment, an outdoor group exhibition of sculpture in public parks and plazas throughout New York City. The exhibition included Placid Civic Monument, Claes Oldenburg's first outdoor public monument, installed beside the Metropolitan Museum of Art. The conceptual performance involved a crew of gravediggers excavating a 6-by-3-foot rectangular hole in the ground.

Among his projects was the presentation of a monumental moai head from Easter Island in the plaza of the Seagram Building in Manhattan in 1968. Green worked with the International Fund for Monuments and sought to use the exhibition to draw attention to the preservation of Easter Island's archaeological heritage.

Green was also involved in the New York presentation of Barnett Newman's Broken Obelisk, as part of the city's Sculpture and Environment program. His public-art projects reflected his interest in combining contemporary art with architecture, urban space, and historic preservation.

Green "retired" from the modern art scene in 1970, at the age of 30. Thereafter, he concentrated on cultivating relationships with celebrities and members of the European aristocracy.

== Preservation work ==
Beginning in the 1970s and increasingly during the final decades of his life, Green became involved in the preservation of historic monuments and sacred sites. He worked to preserve various ancient art installations around the world, including Bhutanese monasteries and Buddhas carved in the mountainsides of Sri Lanka. To expand and sustain his work, in 1997 Green established the Landmarks Foundation, by the time of his death one of America's leading organizations for historic preservation.

In 1997, Green established the Landmarks Foundation, an organization devoted to the preservation of historic and sacred sites. His preservation work represented a continuation of his earlier interest in placing art and architecture in public settings. In 2007, Greed said: "The work I do now is not a reaction against a life spent mixing with the rich, it is a continuation of it. I put all the contacts I have made in my career to good use."

== Personal life ==
Green was known for his extensive friendships with artists, entertainers, and other prominent figures. Guy Trebay of The New York Times wrote: "Of all his varied roles, Mr. Green is likely to be best remembered as a social adventurer, a collector of people who approached the wealthy and famous with the ardor of a lepidopterist wielding a butterfly net." Andy Warhol similarly wrote in his diary: "Sam Green was in everybody's life, such a big part—he's had Yoko Ono and John Lennon and Cecil Beaton and Greta Garbo and me."

=== Cecil Beaton ===
In 1966, Green met British photographer Cecil Beaton through his cousin Henry Plumer McIlhenny, and subsequently became his traveling companion. In 1970, Green and Beaton travelled to Peru and Bolivia on a trip organized by Braniff International Airways, as Beaton began researching a book about his aunt, Jessie Suarez, later published as My Bolivian Aunt (1971). Later that year, Beaton joined Green in Paris before they travelled through the Dordogne region of France.

Through Beaton, Green became acquainted with members of European aristocratic and social circles. In late summer 1973, Beaton returned to Padua with Green to visit Countess Diana Phipps. They also traveled through Tuscany and attended the Volpi Ball in Venice, where guests included Audrey Hepburn, Andy Warhol, Helmut Berger, Bianca Jagger, Diana Vreeland, and Serge Lifar. In February 1974, Beaton traveled to Mexico and later Guatemala with Green. Green and interior designer Suzie Frankfurt interviewed Beaton at the Pierre Hotel in New York for the April 1978 issue of Interview.

Green described his friendship with Beaton as follows: "I adored his company and didn't care about the obvious conclusions. I revelled in his eruditeness, doted on his considering of who I actually was and what I might become. It was a mythical bachelor uncle handsome euphemistic nephew-type situation but (as far as I perceived) neither romantic nor sexual. Not that that wouldn't have been OK, but it wasn't; so that's not the correct conclusion. Fact is, Cecil never made a move on me."

=== Barbara Baekeland ===
In 1969, Green had a brief relationship with socialite Barbara Daly Baekeland, the wife of Brooks Baekeland, heir to the Bakelite fortune. Baekeland became intensely attached to him; on one occasion, she reportedly walked barefoot across Central Park in the snow wearing only a lynx coat to demand entry to his apartment. In 1972, she was stabbed to death by her son, Antony Baekeland, at a flat in Cadogan Square, London. Baekeland named Green as executor of her estate, and he was contacted by authorities in England regarding the case.

The murder was dramatized in the 2007 film Savage Grace, in which Julianne Moore portrayed Barbara and Hugh Dancy portrayed Green. Green praised Dancy's performance and resemblance to him but objected to the film's portrayal of his sexuality and its depiction of him engaging in a ménage à trois with Barbara and Antony, calling it "untrue and a slur." He subsequently took legal action against the filmmakers, which remained unresolved at the time of his death.

=== Candy Darling ===
Green met transgender actress Candy Darling in 1969, when he arranged Cecil Beaton's photoshoot with Andy Warhol at the Factory for Beaton's exhibition 600 Faces by Beaton 1928–69 at the Museum of the City of New York. The resulting photographs include Darling and several other Warhol superstars. Green initially found Darling unattractive, "looking like a man in drag," but noticed that Warhol treated her with particular attention. In April 1969, Women's Wear Daily reported that Green's membership at Raffles, a private dining club, had been revoked after his guests, Ultra Violet and Darling, began dancing together.

In 1971, Green and Darling appeared in the Jackie Curtis's play Vain Victory: The Vicissitudes of the Damned at La MaMa Experimental Theatre Club in Manhattan's East Village. Green was struck by Darling's transformation into a glamorous stage persona. He began courting her "in movieland, in fantasy," later recalling, "She already made it seem a little bit as if I were Sir Laurence Olivier and she was Marilyn Monroe." Green encouraged Darling's ambitions to become a major film and Broadway star. He also arranged a screening of Women in Revolt at Wesleyan University, where the ticket-sale proceeds provide Darling with financial support.

In 1972, Darling began staying at Green's duplex near Lincoln Center at 14 West 68th Street, occupying a separate apartment on the first floor. Green helped pay for her expenses, including dental bills and other necessities. During one of Green's trips out of town, his housekeeper Manuel changed the locks and refused to let him into the apartment once he returned. The incident occurred shortly after the death of Barbara Baekeland, with whom Green had previously had an affair. Green dismissed Manual, whom he said had become preoccupied with witchcraft. After Darling later became ill, she believed that Manual had placed a curse on her.

Darling sometimes referred to Green as her "husband" and implied that they were a couple, although Green had not intended for her to become a permanent resident. She temporarily left his apartment when his sister came to visit during the summer of 1973. Shortly after, Green asked Darling to move out because her dog was not housebroken and repeatedly made messes and damaged things in the apartment.

=== Greta Garbo ===
Green met the retired actress Greta Garbo while traveling with Cecil Beaton in 1970. Cécile de Rothschild introduced them at a party at her home in Saint-Raphaël on Garbo's 65th birthday on September 18. They met again the following winter in New York, and soon became close friends taking regular walks together. They shared a sense of humor and developed their own private jokes during their long walks around Manhattan. By 1972, Garbo had invited Green into her apartment, and he frequently accompanied her home after their walks.

They spoke almost every morning on the telephone discussing their activities, mutual friends, and subjects ranging from everyday matters to spiritualism. Green recorded their telephone conversations after informing Garbo that he routinely recorded calls as part of his work as an art dealer. They agreed that the recordings would not be used commercially or otherwise exploited.

Green introduced Garbo to his interests in alternative health and spirituality, including transcendental meditation. In April 1975, she agreed to two visits from a certified instructor affiliated with the Maharishi Foundation. He also introduced Garbo to fashion editor Diana Vreeland, and later arranged a private viewing of Halston's new collection in 1977. Despite Green's request for privacy, the visit was reported on the front page of Women's Wear Daily, prompting Garbo to complain that she could no longer go anywhere without attracting attention. In 1978, when Garbo needed treatment for a troublesome tooth but refused to visit a dentist's office, Green arranged for his dentist, Irving Schultz, to examine her outdoors on a bench near Central Park West and West 72nd Street.

Green also became Garbo's traveling companion. In summer 1973, they joined Rothschild and friends aboard the yacht Bibo on a crusie to Corsica. In October 1975, they traveled to County Donegal, Ireland with curator Joseph Rishel where they stayed at Green's cousin Henry McIlhenny's Glenveagh Castle, and also visited Beaton at his home in Wiltshire. In 1976, Garbo accepted Green's invitation to spend two weeks at his home on Fire Island. They subsequently traveled together to Paris and Klosters, Switzerland, in 1977, and to Green's home in Cartagena, Colombia, in 1978. In 1979, they visited Versailles and the Panthéon in Paris, and in September 1982, Green, Garbo, and Rosthschild cruised to a private island near Poros, Greece.

Their friendship ended in 1985 after the Globe published a cover story, based on information reportedly provided by Green's assistant, claiming that Garbo was planning to marry Green. Green had been in Colombia at the time and denied any involvement with the story. After returning, he called Garbo and she told him that he had "done a terrible thing" before hanging up the phone. Green later said that Garbo had also been falsely told that he played recordings of their private conversations at a party. Following Garbo's death, Green donated over 100 hours of recordings of their conversations to Wesleyan University in 1994.

=== Yoko Ono and John Lennon ===
Green reconnected with Japanese artist Yoko Ono in 1976, having first met her briefly in the 1960s through their mutual friend, tarot guru John Green. He became a close friend and adviser to Ono and her husband, musician John Lennon. In January 1977, Green helped arrange for the Lennons to attend the Jimmy Carter's United States presidential inauguration in Washington, D.C.

For Ono's birthday in 1977, Lennon asked Green to arrange for several fine stones to be brought to the Dakota, from which she selected a light-blue gem valued at $11,000. That March, Green accompanied Ono on a trip to South America, where he introduced her to a bruja known as Lena, a woman known for her witchcraft in Cartagena, Colombia. Later that year, when Lennon and Ono travelled to Japan, Green joined them for part of their stay and spent time with the couple and their son, Sean Lennon. In 1978, Green accompanied the Lennons when they travelled to Delaware County, New York, where they purchased of a farm.

In early 1979, Green learned from a colleague about an archaeological excavation in Egypt to unearth an ancient temple that was seeking additional funding to complete its work. He relayed the information to Ono, who provided funds for the excavation and began planning a visit to the site with Lennon and Green. While they were in Cairo, Green became concerned that their celebrity would attract the attention of Egyptian authorities and jeopardize the excavation. He enlisted art administrator Thomas Hoving and Charlie Swan to discourage Ono from proceeding, and she ultimately abandoned the plan.

In 1980, Green allegedly became romantically involved with Ono. According to accounts cited by Geoffrey Giuliano, Ono spent time with Green at his home on Fire Island while Lennon was in Bermuda. Artist Sam Havadtoy reportedly questioned Lennon about Ono's relationship with Green. Lennon suggested that Ono, like himself, might have occasional affairs, although the extent of his knowledge of their relationship was unclear. Following Lennon's murder in December 1980, Ono reorganized her inner circle, and Green was no longer closely involved in her affairs.

==== Lennon–Ono piano ====
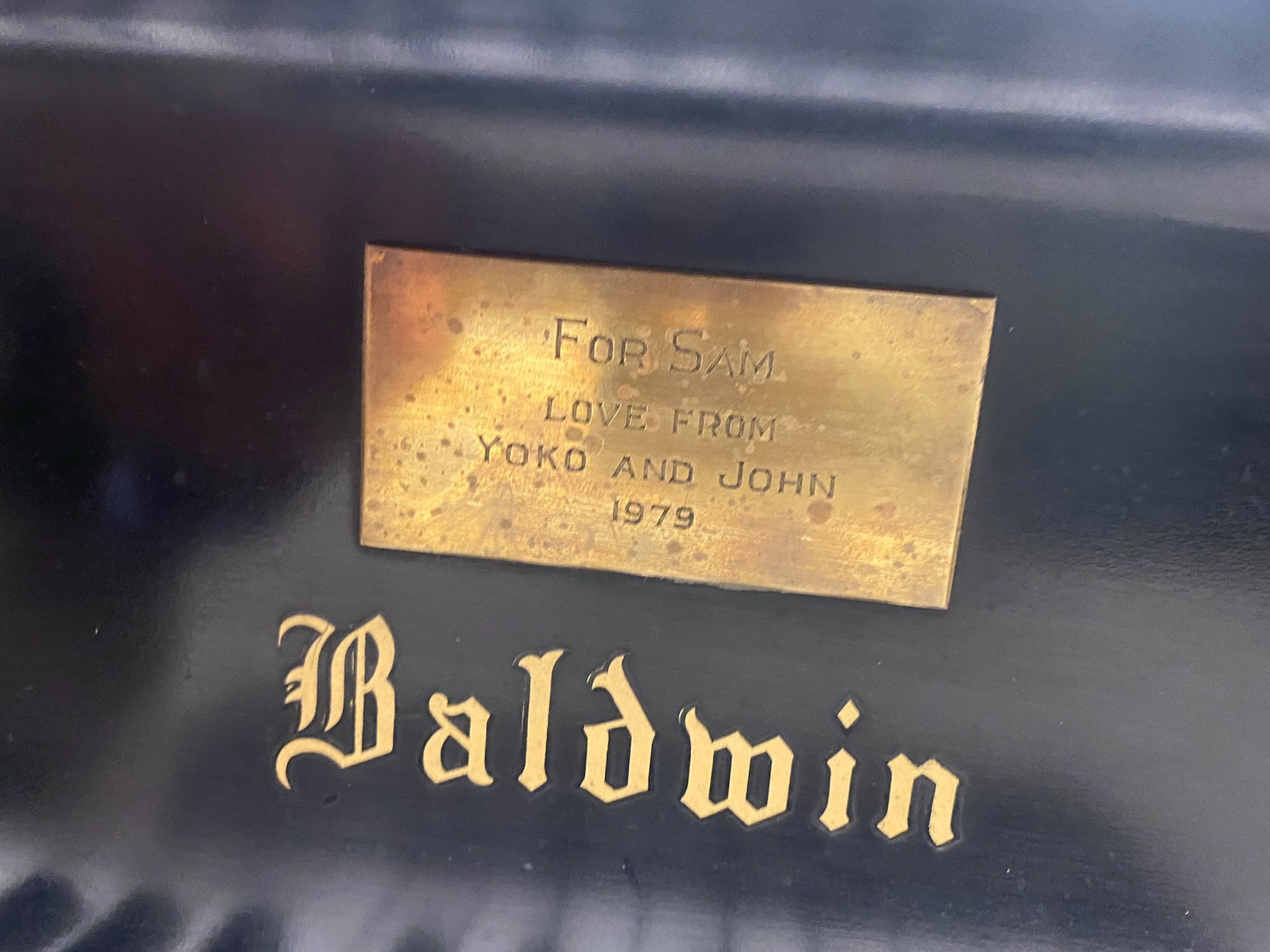
Gift Plaque on Piano gifted from John and Yoko to Sam Adams Green in 1979

In 1978, Lennon purchased a 1929 Baldwin concert grand piano. The following year, he and Ono gave the piano to Green. It bears a plaque reading "For Sam Love From Yoko and John 1979." Lennon played the piano when visiting Green.

Green loaned the piano to Warhol, who kept it at his studio from 1983 to 1986. Green subsequently loaned it to the New York Academy of Art, where it remained until 1999. The piano was sold without Green's knowledge or authorization, leading him to file a lawsuit against the academy in 2000 seeking its return or $1.7 million in damages.

The piano was eventually recovered, although Green did not regain ownership. Following provenance research conducted after Green's death, the instrument became known as the Lennon–Ono–Green–Warhol piano, reflecting its associations with Lennon, Ono, Green, and Warhol.

In 2023, Mercersburg Academy, which had acquired the piano through a deed of trust, consigned it to Alex Cooper Auctioneers in Baltimore for sale, with proceeds designated for student scholarships.

== Death ==
Green died at the age of 70 on March 4, 2011 in New York City.

At the time of Green's death, the ICA in Philadelphia was planning an exhibition based on his 1965 exhibition of Warhol's work. The exhibition titled "That's How We Escaped": Reflections on Warhol ran at the ICA from April 21 to August 7, 2011.

Green left his papers and audio recordings concerning notable figures including Cecil Beaton, Greta Garbo, John Lennon, Yoko Ono to Yale University.
