= Stuart House, London =

Townhouse in Knightsbridge, London

Stuart House
- Interactive map of the Stuart House area

General information
- Type: Residential
- Architectural style: Flemish-inspired, Pont Street Dutch
- Location: London, England
- Coordinates: 51°29′38″N 0°09′39″W
- Completed: 1884

Design and construction
- Architects: Frederick George Knight with Hunt & Steward

Listed Building – Grade II
- Official name: Stuart House
- Designated: 15 April 1969
- Reference no.: 1358111

Stuart House at 84 Cadogan Square is a large Grade II listed townhouse on Cadogan Square in the Knightsbridge area of London.

== History and description ==
Cadogan Square was laid out between 1877 and 1888. Part of the Cadogan Estate, it consists of tall red-brick townhouses in the "Pont Street Dutch" style.

Stuart House was a particularly large house built for Oscar Leslie Stephen, a director of the Great Northern Railway. It was designed in 1880 by Frederick George Knight with Hunt & Steward and built between 1882 and 1884. In-keeping with the rest of the area architecturally, it features a large central Dutch gable, with terracotta sculptural reliefs depicting the life of Mary, Queen of Scots.

In 2021 the house was put on sale with an asking price of £35 million.

== See also ==
- 4 Cadogan Square
