= 68 Cadogan Square =

Building in Cadogan Square, London, England

Coordinates: 51°29′40″N 0°09′40″W

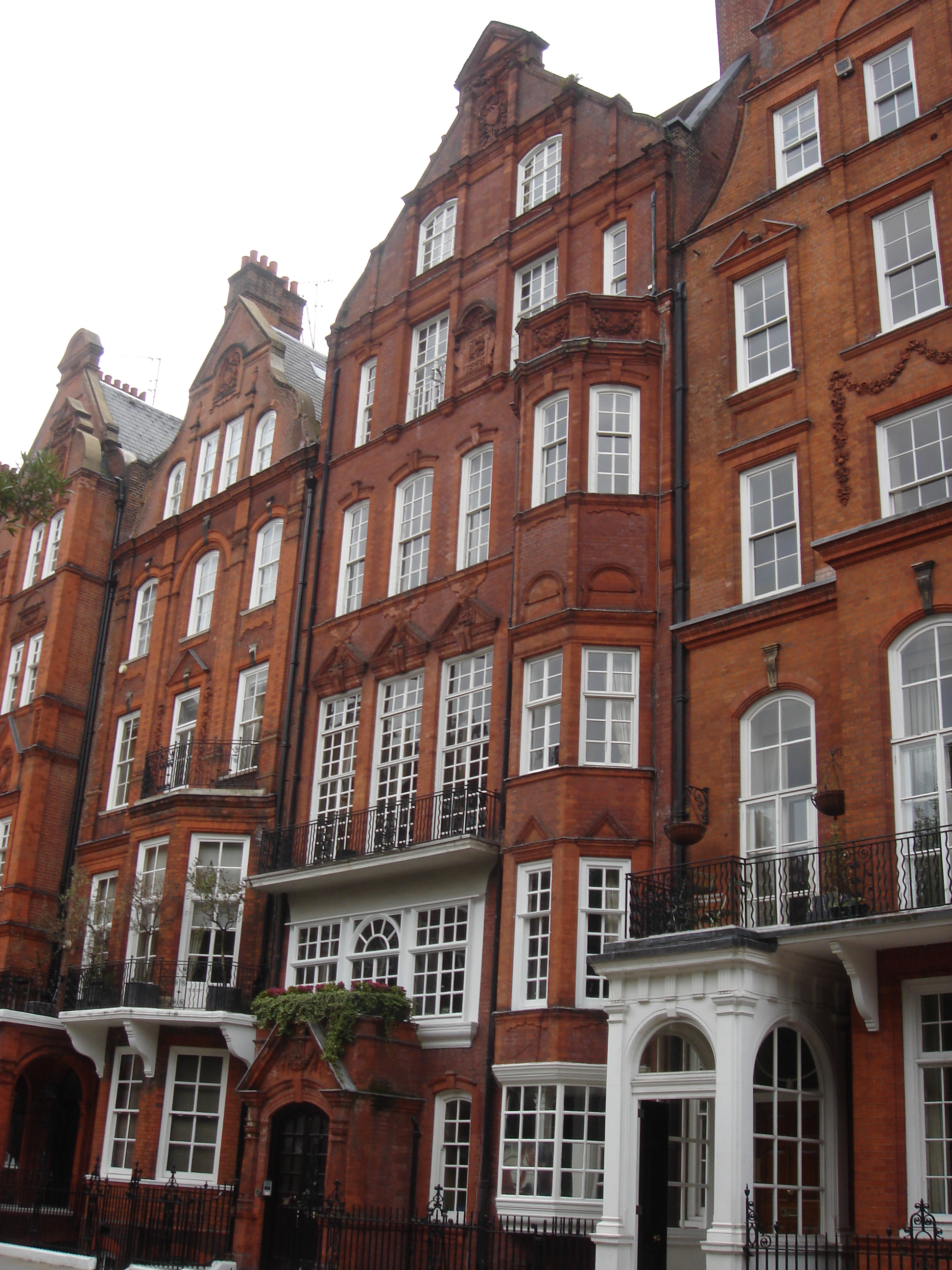
68 Cadogan Square

68 Cadogan Square is a Grade II* listed house in Cadogan Square, London SW1.

The house was built in the British Queen Anne Revival style in 1878, and the architect was Richard Norman Shaw. It is now the location of Sussex House School.

It appears in the James Bond movies Skyfall (2012) and Spectre (2015).
