= Amil brothers murder case =

2014 murder case in Ampatuan, Maguindanao, Philippines

- The Amil brothers at the scene in the aftermath of their mother's murder in Ampatuan, Maguindanao
- Date: January or February 2014
- Location: Purok Nabadtog, Barangay Kamasi, Ampatuan, Maguindanao, Philippines
- Victim: Akrima "Musala" Amil (56)
- Perpetrators: Dante Amil, Paroy Amil, and Ibrahim Amil
- Charges: Murder
- Motive: Suspects claimed they were attempting to remove an illness they believed was caused by an evil spirit

In late January or February 2014, at Purok Nabadtog in Barangay Kamasi, Ampatuan, Maguindanao, Philippines, 56-year-old Akrima "Musala" Amil was killed by her three sons, Dante, Paroy, and Ibrahim Amil. The brothers were accused of mutilating her body and consuming parts of it, according to investigators. They later said they were trying to remove an illness they believed had been caused by an evil spirit.

The incident attracted national attention after investigators reported that parts of the victim's body had been eaten. Esquire Philippines described the case as one of the notable crimes in Maguindanao in the years following the Ampatuan massacre in 2009.

== Background ==
The incident occurred in Purok Nabadtog, Barangay Kamasi, Ampatuan, a predominantly Moro community in Maguindanao. The suspects were identified as brothers Dante Amil (aged 35), Paroy Amil (aged 21), and Ibrahim Amil (aged 18). The three lived with their mother, Akrima Amil, who was 56 years old at the time of her death. Community leaders said that the brothers had no previous criminal records in their barangay. Some residents attributed the incident to beliefs about evil spirits and local folklore, while others suspected that illegal drug use may have influenced the crime.

== Murder ==
In 2014, neighbors reported hearing screams and other unusual sounds coming from the Amil family's residence over several days. After residents alerted local authorities, officers went to the house and discovered the body of Akrima Amil. According to investigators, the brothers had restrained their mother and attacked her with machetes. Authorities reported that the victim's body had been mutilated. Her throat had been slit, and her eyeballs, internal organs, and other body parts were missing. Investigators and personnel from the municipal health office stated that parts of the victim's body had been consumed raw.

The brothers denied intentionally killing their mother. One of the suspects said that they were attempting to treat her condition, which they believed was caused by possession by an evil spirit. Police officials said that the suspects' explanation was linked to local beliefs involving spirits, although such beliefs were not accepted by many members of the predominantly Muslim community.

== Arrest ==
The three brothers surrendered after barangay tanod went to the family farm in Ampatuan following the incident. Police chief Senior Inspector Ronald De Leon said that charges would be filed against them and that investigators were considering whether drugs played a role in the crime. The suspects were also investigated over claims from neighbors that they may have been under the influence of illegal substances during the attack. Authorities also questioned the suspects' father as part of the investigation. Police further said they were investigating whether the family had a history of mental illness and whether it may have contributed to the crime.

== Aftermath ==
Following the incident, some residents believed that the stories of curses and supernatural beings about the Amil family was true according to the local legends. Anwar Emblawa, a municipal councilor from nearby Datu Abdullah Sangki, rejected these explanations, describing them as superstition. In a 2024 retrospective, Esquire Philippines described the Amil brothers murder case as one of the most notorious crimes committed in Maguindanao following the killing and occurred several years after the Ampatuan massacre in the same province.
