= Landmarks Foundation =

Defunct non-profit organization

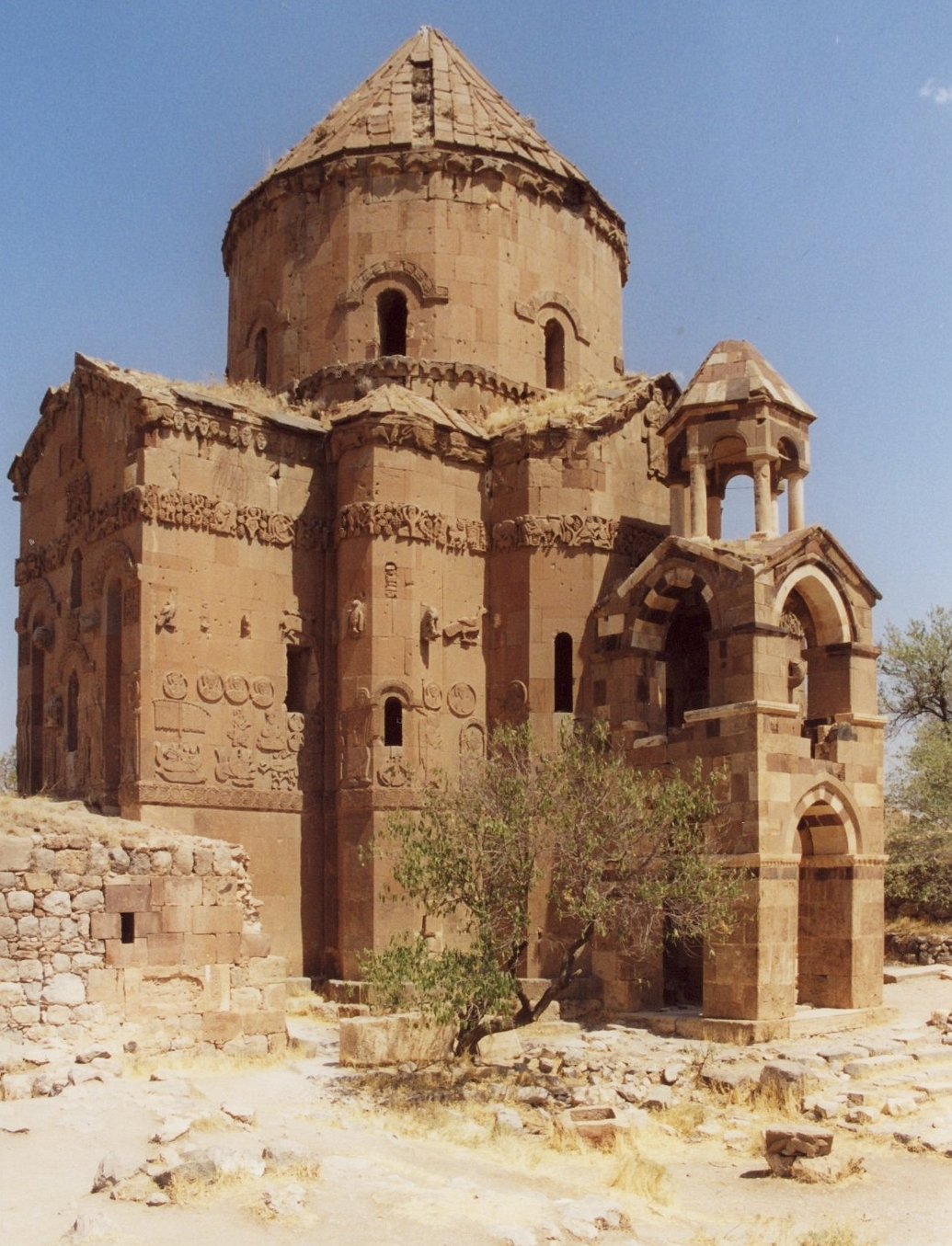
The Cathedral of the Holy Cross on Lake Van in Turkey was one of Landmarks Foundation's preservation projects

Landmarks Foundation, founded in 1997 by Samuel Adams Green and based in New York City, was a non-profit organization created to conserve sacred sites and landscapes around the world. The foundation motto was "protecting sacred sites globally."

The following defines what the Landmarks Foundation was founded to ward and why:

Whether locations are in current use today or relics left by vanished ancestors, these sacred places are tangible and sometimes intangible focal points for the beliefs, rituals and religions that define human societies. These structures and integral natural settings are threatened by economic expansion, desecration, pollution and neglect as well as by natural disasters and erosion. Just like the natural world, mankind's spiritual heritage is in need of dedicated protection.

The Landmarks Foundation directs funding and technical expertise to local groups that cannot protect their sacred cultural heritage without assistance. Selection of specific projects is based on cultural significance and degree of jeopardy. In describing their methods, a spokesperson for Landmarks Foundation remarked that "Piecemeal restoration is no substitute for a master plan ...".

Sites to which the Landmarks Foundation has lent its efforts towards protecting include the following:

- the stone spheres of Costa Rica
- the Moai of Easter Island
- the Kaleshwar Temple Complex in India
- the Misión Santa Catarina Virgen y Mártir and Huichol sacred sites in Mexico
- the ruined city of Ani and the Cathedral of the Holy Cross on Lake Van in Turkey
- the Sajama Lines of Bolivia

The Landmarks Foundation relied upon donations for its funding. Robert F. Kennedy Jr., Robert de Rothschild, Princess Elizabeth, and Mesrob II are among its members and supporters. The Landmarks Foundation's advisory board was a multi-national assembly of conservation experts from around the world.
