= Leo Baekeland =

Belgian chemist (1863–1944); inventor of Bakelite

Leo Baekeland HonFRSE
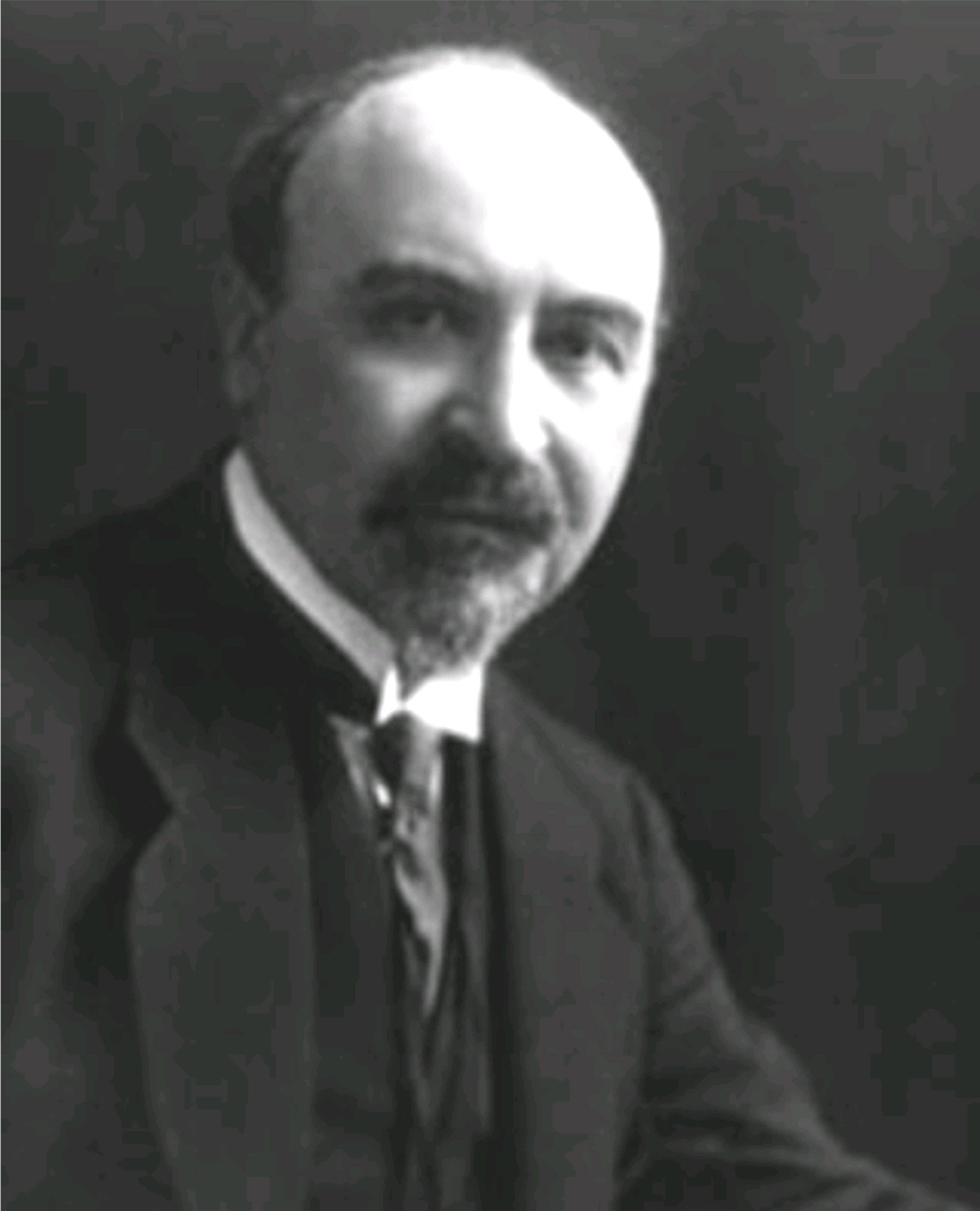
- Baekeland in 1916
- Born: Leo Hendrik Baekeland; November 14, 1863; Ghent, Belgium
- Died: February 23, 1944 (aged 80); Beacon, New York, U.S.
- Education: University of Ghent
- Occupations: Chemist, inventor
- Known for: Plastics research, Bakelite, Novolac, Velox photographic paper
- Spouse: Céline Swarts (m. 1889)
- Children: 3
- Relatives: Barbara Daly Baekeland (granddaughter-in-law); Antony Baekeland (great-grandson)
- Awards: John Scott Medal (1910); William H. Nichols Medal (1910); Willard Gibbs Award (1913); Perkin Medal (1916); Franklin Medal (1940)

Leo Hendrik Baekeland (/ˈbeɪklænd/ BAYK-land; Dutch: [ˈleːjoː ˈɦɛndrɪɡ ˈbaːkəlɑnt]; November 14, 1863 – February 23, 1944) was a Belgian chemist. Educated in Belgium and Germany, he spent most of his career in the United States. He is best known for the inventions of Velox photographic paper in 1893, and Bakelite in 1907. He has been called "The Father of the Plastics Industry" for his invention of Bakelite, an inexpensive, non-flammable and versatile plastic, which marked the beginning of the modern plastics industry.

== Early life ==
Leo Baekeland was born in Ghent, Belgium, on November 14, 1863, the son of a cobbler, Charles Baekeland, and a house maid, Rosalia Merchie. His siblings were: Elodia Maria Baekeland; Melonia Leonia Baekeland; Edmundus Baekeland; Rachel Helena Baekeland and Delphina Baekeland.

He told The Literary Digest: "The name is a Dutch word meaning 'Land of Beacons.'" He spent much of his early life in Ghent, Belgium. He graduated with honours from the Ghent Municipal Technical School and was awarded a scholarship by the City of Ghent to study chemistry at the Ghent University, which he entered in 1880. He acquired a PhD maxima cum laude at the age of 21. After a brief appointment as Professor of Physics and Chemistry at the Government Higher Normal School in Bruges (1887–1889), he was appointed associate professor of chemistry at Ghent University in 1889.

== Personal life ==
Baekeland married Céline Swarts (1868–1944) on August 8, 1889, and they had two children. One of their grandsons, Brooks, married Barbara Daly in 1942 and they had one child. Hugh Karraker, one of their great-grandsons, devoted the last years of his life raising awareness of Baekeland's impact on modern life. He produced an hour-long documentary, All Things Bakelite, which was shown at film festivals and on PBS stations nation-wide.

== Career ==
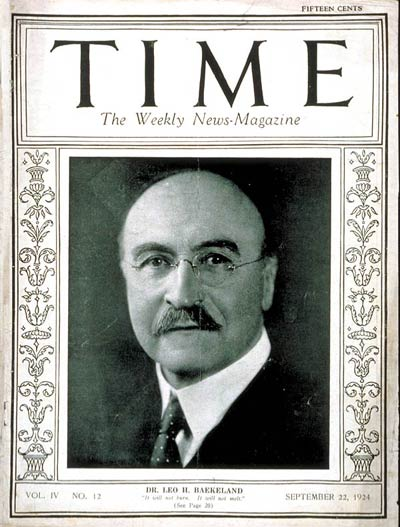
Time cover, September 22, 1924

In 1889, Baekeland and his wife Céline took advantage of a travel scholarship to visit universities in England and the United States. They visited New York City, where he met Professor Charles F. Chandler of Columbia University and Richard Anthony, of the E. and H.T. Anthony photographic company. Professor Chandler was influential in convincing Baekeland to stay in the United States. Baekeland had already invented a process to develop photographic plates using water instead of other chemicals, which he had patented in Belgium in 1887. Although this method was unreliable, Anthony saw potential in the young chemist and offered him a job.

Baekeland worked for the Anthony company for two years, and in 1891, set up in business for himself working as a consulting chemist. However, a spell of illness and disappearing funds made him rethink his actions and he decided to return to his old interest of producing a photographic paper that would allow enlargements to be printed by artificial light. After two years of intensive effort, he perfected the process to produce the paper, which he named "Velox"; it was the first commercially successful photographic paper. At the time, the US was suffering a recession and there were no investors or buyers for his proposed new product, so Baekeland became partners with Leonard Jacobi and established the Nepera Chemical Company in Nepera Park, Yonkers, New York.

In 1899, Jacobi, Baekeland, and Albert Hahn, a further associate, sold Nepera to George Eastman of the Eastman Kodak Co. for $750,000. Baekeland earned approximately $215,000 net through the transaction.

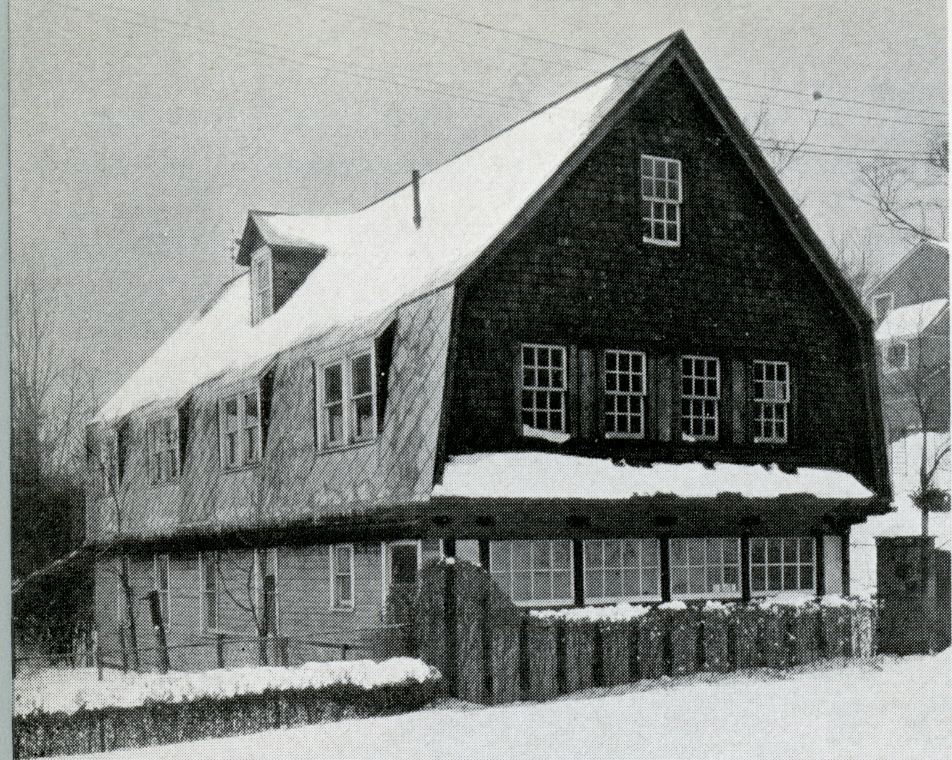
Baekeland's Yonkers Laboratory

With a portion of the money he purchased "Snug Rock", a house in Harmony Park, Yonkers, New York, where he set up his own well-equipped laboratory. There, he later said,

"in comfortable financial circumstances, a free man, ready to devote myself again to my favorite studies... I enjoyed for several years that great blessing, the luxury of not being interrupted in one's favorite work."

One of the requirements of the Nepera sale was, in effect, a non-compete clause: Baekeland agreed not to do research in photography for at least 20 years. He would have to find a new area of research. His first step was to go to Germany in 1900, for a "refresher in electrochemistry" at the Technical Institute at Charlottenburg.

Upon returning to the United States, Baekeland was involved briefly but successfully in helping Clinton Paul Townsend and Elon Huntington Hooker to develop a production-quality electrolytic cell. Baekeland was hired as an independent consultant, with the responsibility of constructing and operating a pilot plant. Baekeland developed a stronger diaphragm cell for the chloralkali process, using woven asbestos cloth filled with a mixture of iron oxide, asbestos fibre, and iron hydroxide. Baekeland's improvements were important to the founding of Hooker Chemical Company and the construction of one of the world's largest electrochemical plants, at Niagara Falls.

Baekeland was elected to the American Philosophical Society in 1935 and the United States National Academy of Sciences in 1936.

== Invention of Bakelite ==
Having been successful with Velox, Baekeland set out to find another promising area for chemical development. As he had done with Velox, he looked for a problem that offered "the best chance for the quickest possible results". Asked why he entered the field of synthetic resins, Baekeland answered that his intention was to make money. By the 1900s, chemists had begun to recognize that many of the natural resins and fibers were polymeric, a term introduced in 1833 by Jöns Jacob Berzelius. Adolf von Baeyer had experimented with phenols and aldehydes in 1872, particularly pyrogallol and benzaldehyde. He created a "black guck" which he considered useless and irrelevant to his search for synthetic dyes. Baeyer's student, Werner Kleeberg, experimented with phenol and formaldehyde in 1891, but as Baekeland noted "could not crystallize this mess, nor purify it to constant composition, nor in fact do anything with it once produced".

Baekeland began to investigate the reactions of phenol and formaldehyde. He familiarized himself with previous work and approached the field systematically, carefully controlling and examining the effects of temperature, pressure, and the types and proportions of materials used.

The first application that appeared promising was the development of a synthetic replacement for shellac (made from the secretion of lac beetles). Baekeland produced a soluble phenol-formaldehyde shellac called "Novolak" but concluded that its properties were inferior. It never became a big market success, but is still used to this day (e. g. as a photoresist).

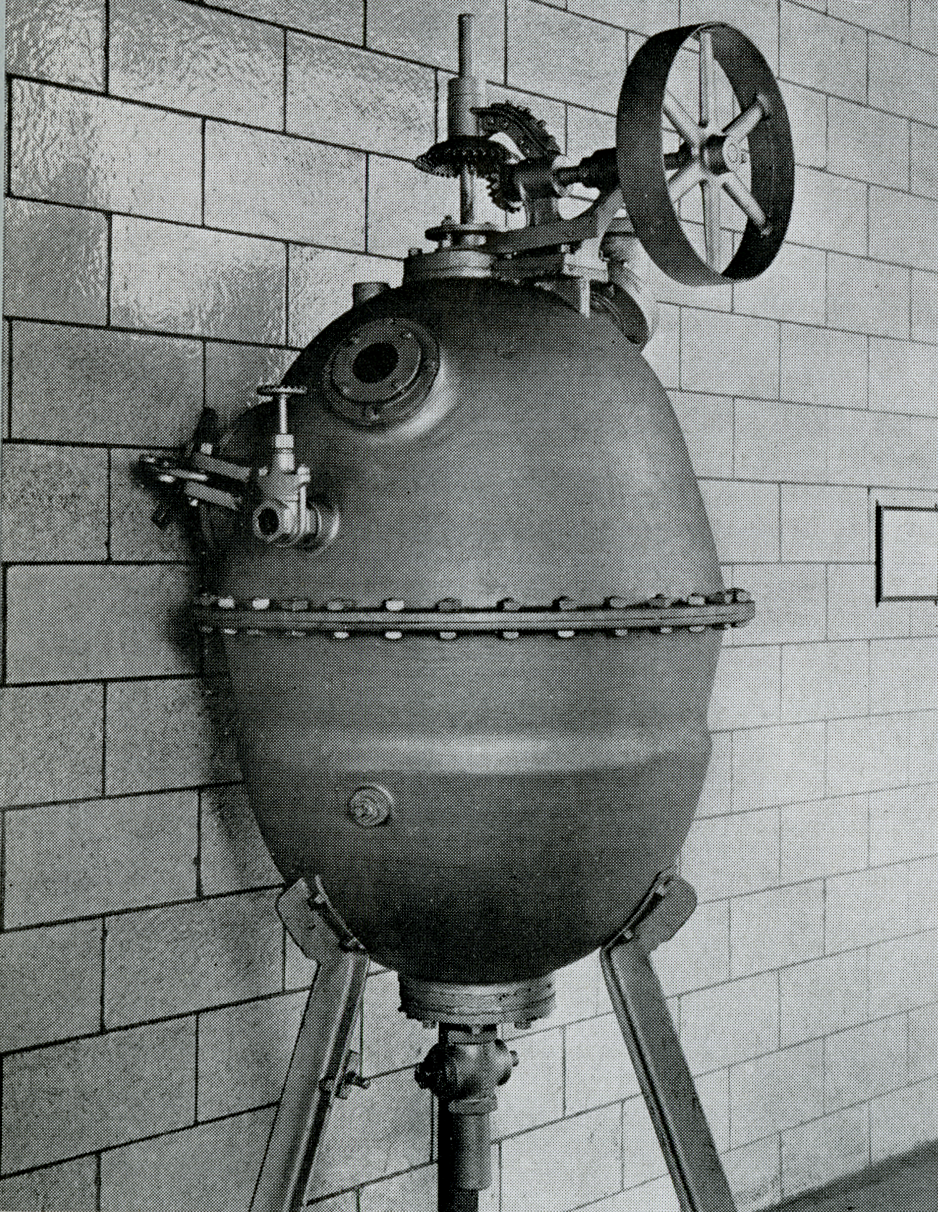
The first semi-commercial Bakelizer, from Baekeland's laboratory

Baekeland continued to explore possible combinations of phenol and formaldehyde, intrigued by the possibility that such materials could be used in molding. By controlling the pressure and temperature applied to phenol and formaldehyde, he produced his dreamed-of hard, moldable plastic: Bakelite.

Bakelite was made from phenol, then known as carbolic acid, and formaldehyde. The chemical name of Bakelite is polyoxybenzylmethylenglycolanhydride. In compression molding, the resin is generally combined with fillers such as wood or asbestos, before pressing it directly into the final shape of the product. Baekeland's process patent for making insoluble products of phenol and formaldehyde was filed in July 1907, and granted on December 7, 1909. In February 1909, Baekeland officially announced his achievement at a meeting of the New York section of the American Chemical Society.

In 1917, Baekeland became a professor by special appointment at Columbia University.

The Smithsonian has documents from the county courthouse for Westchester County in White Plains, New York, indicating that he was admitted to U. S. Citizenship on December 16, 1919.

In 1922, after patent litigation favorable to Baekeland, the General Bakelite Co., which he had founded in 1910, along with the Condensite Co. founded by Aylesworth, and the Redmanol Chemical Products Company founded by Lawrence V. Redman, were merged into the Bakelite Corporation.

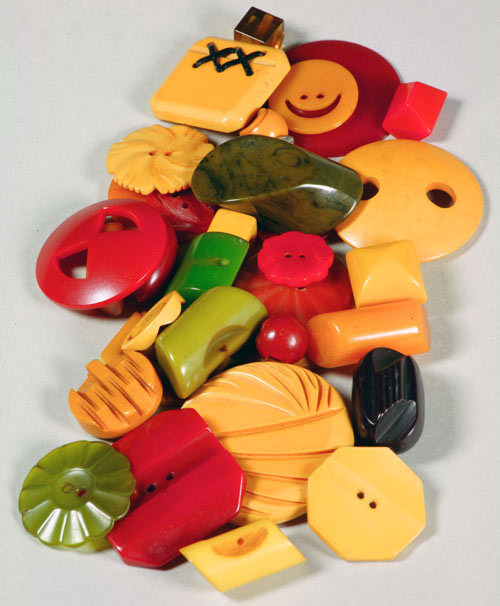
Colorful buttons made from Catalin, another variety of phenolic resin

The invention of Bakelite marks the beginning of the age of plastics. Bakelite was the first plastic invented that retained its shape after being heated. Radios, telephones and electrical insulators were made of Bakelite because of its excellent electrical insulation and heat-resistance. Soon, its applications spread to most branches of industry.

Baekeland received many awards and honors, both during his lifetime and beyond, including the Perkin Medal in 1916 and the Franklin Medal in 1940. In 1974 he was posthumously inducted into the Plastics Hall of Fame and in 1978 he was likewise inducted into the National Inventors Hall of Fame in Akron, Ohio.

At the time of Baekeland's death in 1944, the world production of Bakelite was ca. 175,000 tons, and it was used in over 15,000 different products. He held more than 100 patents, including processes for the separation of copper and cadmium, and for the impregnation of wood.

== Later life and death ==
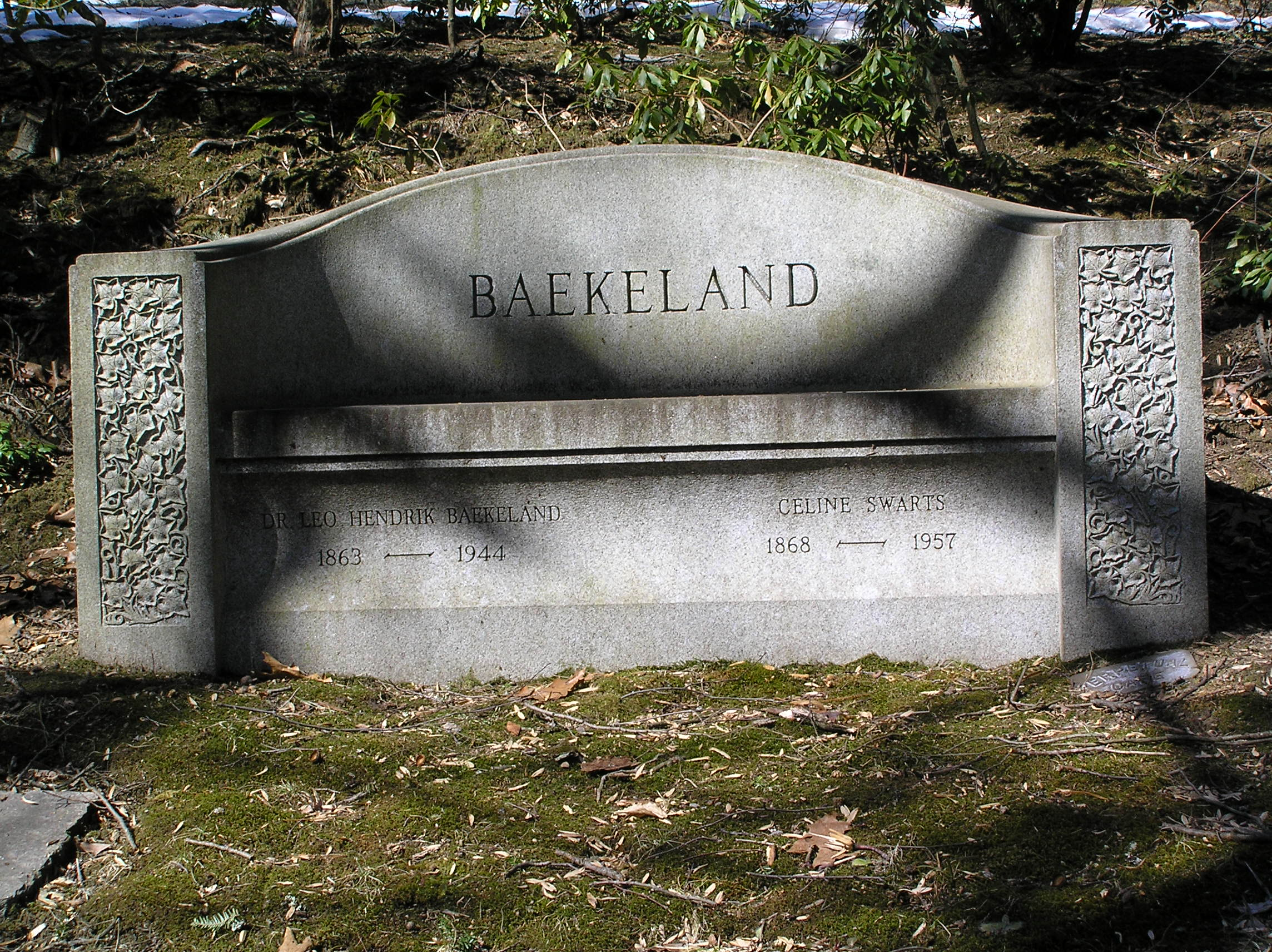
The gravesite of Leo Hendrik Baekeland

As Baekeland grew older he became more eccentric. Biographer Carl Kauffman, interviewed on NPR's All Things Considered, gave this example: "He would simply walk into the pool with his clothes on, get himself nicely soaking wet, walk out, cool off without ever putting on a swim suit or anything else. As he said, evaporation is a cooling process." He entered into fierce battles with his son and presumptive heir over salary and other issues. He sold the General Bakelite Company to Union Carbide in 1939 and, at his son's prompting, he retired. He became a recluse, attempting to develop an immense tropical garden on his winter estate in Coconut Grove, Florida. He died of a stroke in a sanatorium in Beacon, New York, in 1944. Baekeland is buried in Sleepy Hollow Cemetery in Sleepy Hollow, New York.

Awards and achievements
Preceded by Seymour Parker Gilbert	Cover of Time Magazine; September 22, 1924	Succeeded by Hiram Johnson
