= Richard Mason (novelist, born 1977) =

South African-British novelist (born 1978)

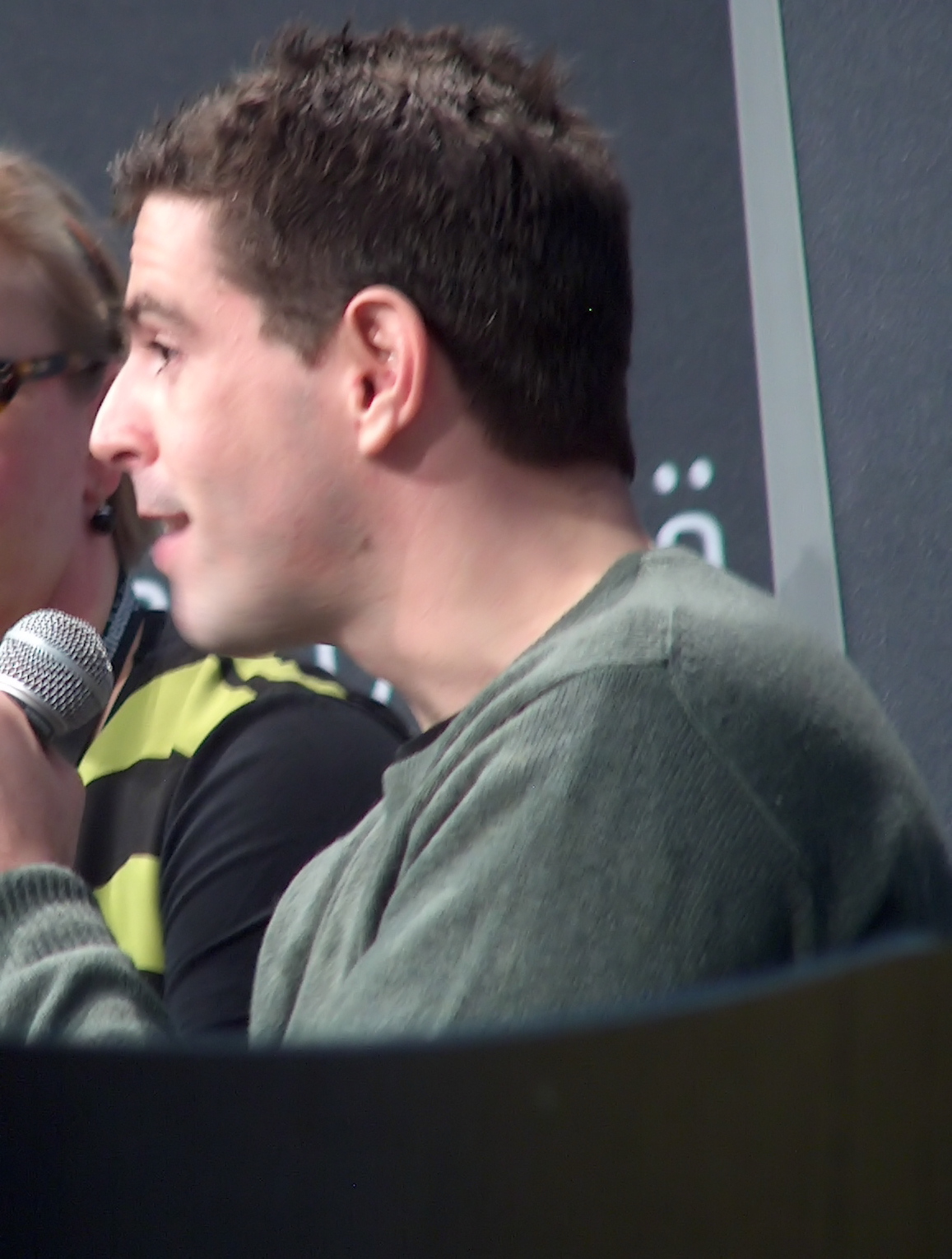
- English writer Richard Mason was interviewed at the Helsinki Book Fair 2008.
- Born: 4 January 1978 (age 48); Johannesburg, South Africa
- Education: Eton College
- Occupation: Novelist
- Writing career
- Notable work: The Drowning People
- Notable awards: Grinzane Cavour Prize

Richard Mason (born 1978) is a South African-British novelist and philanthropist.

== Early life ==
Richard Mason was born on 4 January 1978 in Johannesburg, South Africa. His parents, who were anti-Apartheid activists, relocated to the United Kingdom when he was just 10 years old. Mason pursued his education at Sussex House School.

== Career ==
Richard Mason gained initial recognition in 1999 at the age of 21, being hailed by The Times of London as the "king of the hot young writers." He had just published his first novel, The Drowning People, an "exceptional achievement" (Guardian) that became "one of the most talked-about first novels of 1999" (Daily Telegraph). The Telegraph stated, "If you want to be au courant with modern fiction, you will need to read it."

"The Drowning People" sold more than a million copies in over 20 countries, was translated into 22 languages, and won Italy's Grinzane Cavour Prize for Best First Novel.

Mason's second novel, Us (2005), was "an explosive mixture of cocky irony and elegy" and took five years to write. It fuses the narratives of two men and a woman, each remembering their time at Oxford and the parts they played in the death of a dear friend. The critics' response was enthusiastic. As Rebecca Pearson wrote in the Independent on Sunday: "Only two books in my life have made me cry… [One of them] is Us, Richard Mason's devastatingly tragic, funny, and utterly gripping novel."

In The Lighted Rooms (2008), Mason places an eighty-year-old woman in the grip of dementia at the centre of the drama. What no one knows is that Joan McAllister is having the time of her life, as dementia's hallucinations allow her to revisit her past and the vitality of her youth. The characters in this "immensely readable magnum opus" (The New Yorker) are drawn with "a narrative wisdom surely unknown to most authors in their thirties" – Il Sottoscrito (Italy). As a leading Dutch newspaper wrote, "Richard Mason is a hugely talented writer. When you read his book, you automatically think of authors like Thomas Mann and John Updike. This is a classic novel, written by a future literary master". (Rob Schouten, Trouw)

Mason published his fourth novel in 2011. History of a Pleasure Seeker (2011) was an Oprah Pick of the Month, the story of a dashing young man's adventures through the gilded age, is "the best new work of fiction to cross my desk in many moons." (Jonathan Yardley, Washington Post) In his "beautifully turned, classical style" ('New York Times Book Review) Mason shows how sex, while not necessarily the same thing as love, can be a potent force for good. In 2022, History of a Pleasure Seeker was adapted as a musical television show by Disney

== Philanthropy ==
With the royalties of "The Drowning People", Mason established the Kay Mason Foundation. Under the patronage of Nobel Laureate Archbishop Desmond Tutu, the foundation works to identify promising teenagers and give them the education and experience they need to lead South Africa in the post-Apartheid era.

In 2010, Mason became a co-founder of Project Lulutho, in collaboration with the community of Mthwaku in South Africa’s rural Eastern Cape. Mason spent a year under canvas helping with the construction and was a major funder of this center of conservation and green business skills, playing a key role in bringing together the stakeholders from civil society and government necessary to turn a ravaged ecosystem into "a place of hope".

== Prizes ==
Mason’s first novel, The Drowning People, won the Grinzane Cavour Prize for Best First Novel.

The Lighted Rooms and History of a Pleasure Seeker were long-listed for the Sunday Times Award and The Lighted Rooms was longlisted for the International Dublin Literary Award.

Mason's work for disadvantaged South Africans was honoured by an Inyathelo Award for Merit in Philanthropy in 2010.

== Publishing ==
In 2010, Mason cofounded Orson & Co, a publishing house dedicated to multimedia eBooks. Their edition of Mason's History of a Pleasure Seeker brought together a number of musicians and actors including Downton Abbey's Dan Stevens, tenor Alex Richardson, and pianist Spencer Meyer. Orson & Co suspended its eBook publishing efforts in 2019.

== Bibliography ==
- The Drowning People (1999)
- Us (2005)
- The Lighted Rooms (2008). Published in the United States as Natural Elements.
- History of a Pleasure Seeker (2011)
- Who Killed Piet Barol? (2016)
