= Sussex House School =

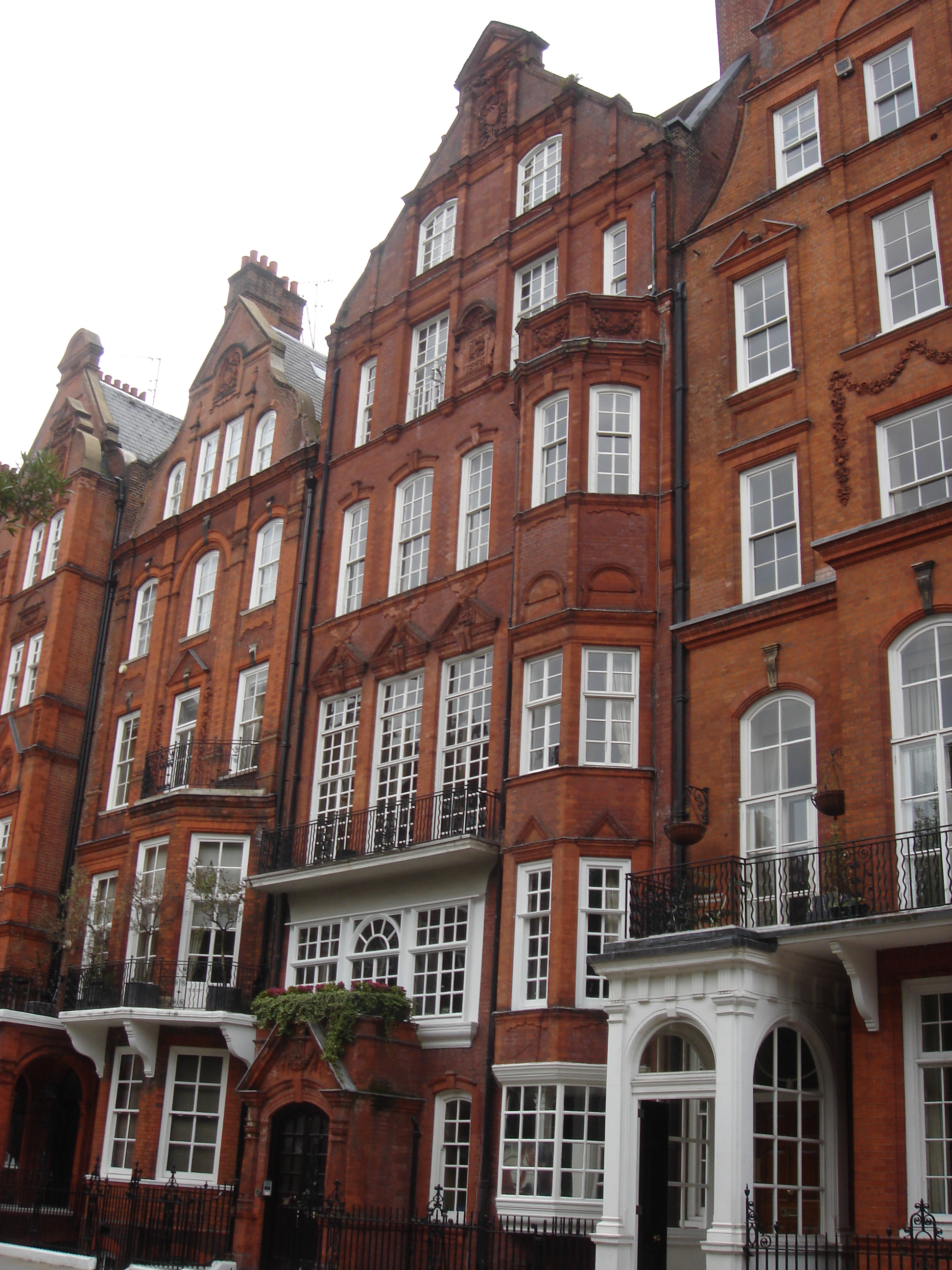

Location
- 68 Cadogan Square; London, Middlesex, SW1X 0EA; England; 51.4946°N 0.1615°W

Information
- Type: Private preparatory school
- Motto: ‘Lead me to the rock that is higher than I’
- Religious affiliation: Church of England
- Established: 1952
- Founder: Vernon Davies
- Sister school: Lyndhurst House Prepataory School (defunct 2023)
- Local authority: Kensington and Chelsea
- Department for Education URN: 100514 Tables
- Headmaster: Headmaster Nicholas Kaye
- Chaplain: Revd. Michael Neville
- Gender: Boys
- Age: 8 to 13
- Enrolment: 190
- Houses: Stuart; Tudor; Norman
- Colours: Dark blue, ochre and mulberry
- Yearbook: The Cadogan, described as a “yearbook-cum-magazine” by Nicholas Coleridge in 2025.
- Former pupils: Old Cadogans
- Website: sussexhouseschool.co.uk

Sussex House School (commonly known as Sussex House), is a boys’ preparatory school located in Chelsea, London. Founded in 1952, the school occupies a house designed by Norman Shaw at 68 Cadogan Square, and since 1994 has operated as an independent charitable trust. It typically has a roll of between 180 and 190 pupils.

Affiliated to the Church of England, pupils use nearby St Simon Zelotes as the school chapel. Sussex House offers a variety of sports but is known in particular for its success in fencing. The headmaster maintains links with Eton, KCS Wimbledon, St Paul's, Westminster School, and Winchester College; in any given year around 80 per cent of leavers depart for one of these institutions.

Former pupils are known as Old Cadogans including actor Daniel Radcliffe, author Edward St Aubyn, gerontologist Aubrey de Grey, politicians Thomas Galbraith, 2nd Baron Strathclyde and Sir Charles Walker and filmmaker Matthew Vaughn.

== History ==
Sussex House School was founded in 1952 by educator Vernon Davies, who also founded Sussex House sister school Lyndhurst House Preparatory School and was named after a school he had run in Sussex Place that was destroyed in The Blitz. It received charitable status when it separated from the Vernon Trust in 1994 at the initiative of new headmaster Nicholas Kaye.

=== Headmasters ===
- Marquis Geoffrey de la Condamine de Sèvres 1952-1961
- Denys Roberts 1961-?
- Philip Hall ?-1973
- John Whittaker 1973-1994
- Nicholas Kaye 1994-

Nicholas Kaye, an Old Cadogan and a graduate of Magdalene College, Cambridge is the current headmaster and was appointed to this role in early January 1994, having been deputy since 1986. He has been teaching at the school since 1974. He holds a Master of Arts from Magdalene College, Cambridge, and a Diploma in Religious Education and is a Freedom of the City of London and a Liveryman of the Worshipful Company of Bakers. He is an Educational Consultant to the Malcolm Arnold Academy, Northampton and a Trustee of the Schweitzer Institute for Environmental Ethics at Peterhouse College, Cambridge. He has presented music programmes on BBC Radio 4 and has conducted research on Charles Tournemire. He is the longest-serving member of the Independent Association of Preparatory Schools. The headmaster resides in a flat at the top of the school.

== Profile ==
As of October 2019, the school had 184 pupils enrolled from ages eight or nine (IInd Form) to twelve or thirteen. Of these, 28 spoke English as an additional language and 39 were identified as being very academically gifted, for whom the curriculum is modified. A report by the Independent Schools Inspectorate noted that most pupils come from families with professional and business backgrounds who live within a five-mile (eight-kilometre) radius of the school; the ability of the pupils is above the national average. It has a full-time staff of 21, supplemented by visiting sports and music staff.

There is a variety of 95 student activities, including an architecture club, whose members go on walking tours of Chelsea, and coding club. Although a number of sports are on offer, such as cricket and football, Sussex House has been especially successful in fencing, and has produced more national champions than any other school in Britain.

A board of trustees is responsible for all aspects of running the school, supported by a team of advisory governors. The headmaster is one of the trustees.

=== Admissions ===
The admissions process comprises an interview and a written exam; the latter is taken in January each year and features questions on English, Maths and verbal reasoning. A report from the previous school is also taken into consideration. In total, 36 boys are admitted each academic year.

The main pre-prep feeders are reportedly Garden House School, Eaton House Belgravia, Redcliffe School, Norland Place School, both Wetherby Kensington and Notting Hill Schools and Hawkesdown House.

=== Fees ===
School fees are charged termly and are payable on or before the first day of each term. There are no compulsory extras on the fees, but extras including extracurricular activities and trips & travel are charged. If a boy is withdrawn or expelled from the school either a full term’s notice or a payment of a term’s fees in lieu of notice must be given.

The fee was £11,100 per term, for a total of £33,300 over the three-term academic year during the 2024-5 academic year, but rose to its current amount of £11,544 per term, £34, 632 per year.

=== 68 Cadogan Square & 67 Cadogan Street ===
The school is located in a restored Victorian building built in 1878 by renowned architect Norman Shaw for Sir Francis Layland-Barratt and school neighbours included Arnold Bennett, Dame Jean Conan Doyle and Martha Gellhorn. The school contains wallpaper by William Morris and Augustus Pugin.

The Dennis Hunt Music School, gymnasium and carpentry rooms are located in the Nicholls Hall, a former Victorian mission located at 67 Cadogan Street.

== Spiritual life ==
All boys at the School must study Religious Studies once a week, attend Assemblies including prayers and attend Friday morning church services at the school chapel, St Simon Zelotes, where the churchwardens are boys of the School. The School is of an Anglican affiliation. The Vicar and Curate of the Church are ex officio Chaplain and Associate Chaplain of the School.

=== St Mary Magdalene ===
Sussex House has a long-standing association with St Mary Magdalene Church, Little Venice, of which the headmaster was a parishioner as a child, and is Musical Director, and master Revd. Robert Rainford is Liturgical Consultant. Every year on All Saints Day, Sussex House performs a little-known French Requiem, with requiems including Saent-Seans, Inghelbrecht, Ropartz, Tomasi and Bruneau (the 1986 Sussex House performance of Bruneau was the second performance, after the first in 1896, and the first British performance.) It also performs its annual Singers and Soloists Concert at St Mary Magdalene. Articles about the requiems have appeared in The Times and The Guardian.

== Trustees, governing body and officers ==
Trustees:

- Xavier B. F. Mayer (Chairman)
- Mrs. Jennifer Marie Elias
- Nicholas Paul Kaye
- Richard Thomas George Winter CBE FCA
- Lady A.J. Pettigas
- Oliver Schneider-Sikorsky (alumnus)

Governing Board:

- J. A. Crewe (Chairman)
- Mrs. Jennifer Marie Elias
- Julian Dominique Gallant
- H. D. Grayson
- P. D. Hargreaves
- R. T. G. Winter CBE FCA

Forbes Secretaries was nominated to be Secretary on 5 January 1994, but the nomination was withdrawn on 13 January 1994, eight days later. The company secretary was headmaster Nicholas Kaye from 13 January 1994 to 11 November 2025, when Lucy Anne Maunder, the school bursar, became secretary. The position is not to be confused with School Secretary.

There are no registered persons with significant responsibility (PSRs).

== Notable former pupils ==
Former pupils are known as Old Cadogans, named after the square on which the school is located (Cadogan Square).

- Martin T. Barlow, Professor of Mathematics at the University of British Columbia
- Professor Caspar Hare, 3rd Viscount Blakenham
- Jasper Britton, actor
- (Edward) Charles Cadogan, 9th Earl Cadogan.
- Giles Chichester, chairman of Francis Chichester Ltd and former Member and Vice-President and Member (for South West England and Gibraltar) of the European Parliament.
- Michael Csanyi-Wills, composer of works including A Cadogan Psalm.
- Professor Armand D'Angour, author and Fellow in Classics at Jesus College, Oxford, Socrates in Love: The Making of a Philosopher (2019). D’Angour’s brother Anthony, Managing Director of Tin Box International Ltd, also attended.
- Aubrey de Grey, biomedical gerontologist
- Peter Dubens, internet entrepreneur and investor, founder of Oakley Capital, and a parent.
- Hugo Rhys, 10th Baron Dynevor
- Thomas Galbraith, 2nd Baron Strathclyde, Leader of the House of Lords (2010–2013)
- Dean Godson, Baron Godson, former leader writer of The Daily Telegraph and Director of Policy Exchange
- Jason Goodwin, author and historian, The Janissary Tree (2006)
- Tarquin Hall, author, travel writer and journalist
- Thomas Hardinge, 8th Viscount Hardinge
- Sebastian James, CEO of Veonet and former CEO of Boots (company), and Dixons Carphone, now Currys.
- Rowan Joffé, screenwriter and director, Brighton Rock (2010) and Before I Go to Sleep (2014)
- Robin Le Mesurier, guitarist
- David Litman, American entrepreneur
- Richard Mason, novelist, The Drowning People (1999), “History of a Pleasure Seeker”
- Alexander McDonnell, Viscount Dunluce
- Daniel Radcliffe, actor
- Benedict Noakes, later known as Benedict Rattigan, director of the Schweitzer Institute for Environmental Ethics.
- David Rennie, The Economist geopolitics editor and author of the Telegram column.
- Edward St Aubyn, novelist known for the Patrick Melrose series
- David Szalay, novelist and winner of the Booker Prize
- Matthew Vaughn, filmmaker
- Sir Charles Walker KBE, former senior British backbench MP, three-time parliamentary committee chair and Independent Parliamentary Standards Authority Board Member.
- Lord Nicholas Windsor.
- Andrew Wolstenholme OBE FREng, civil engineer, former Chief Executive of Crossrail

Parents include the politicians Jeremy Hunt, Rory Stewart, Sir Tam Galbraith, KBE MP, Karan Bilimoria, Baron Bilimoria, after whom the School’s annual Bilimoria Debate is named, Sir Christopher James, 5th Baron Northbourne, and Mark Cubitt, 5th Baron Ashcombe, the royals Prince Edward, Duke of Kent, Katharine, Duchess of Kent, Alexander Windsor, Earl of Ulster, Claire, Countess of Ulster, Lord Nicholas Windsor and Lady Nicholas Windsor, MI6 Chief Sir John Rennie and the aristocrats the Dowager Duchess of St Albans, Michael Hare, 2nd Viscount Blakenham, Richard Rhys, 9th Baron Dynevor, Sir Andrew Hardinge, 7th Viscount Hardinge and Randal Alexander McDonnell, 10th Earl of Antrim, and the sailor Francis Chichester.
