= 4 Cadogan Square =

Building in Cadogan Square, London

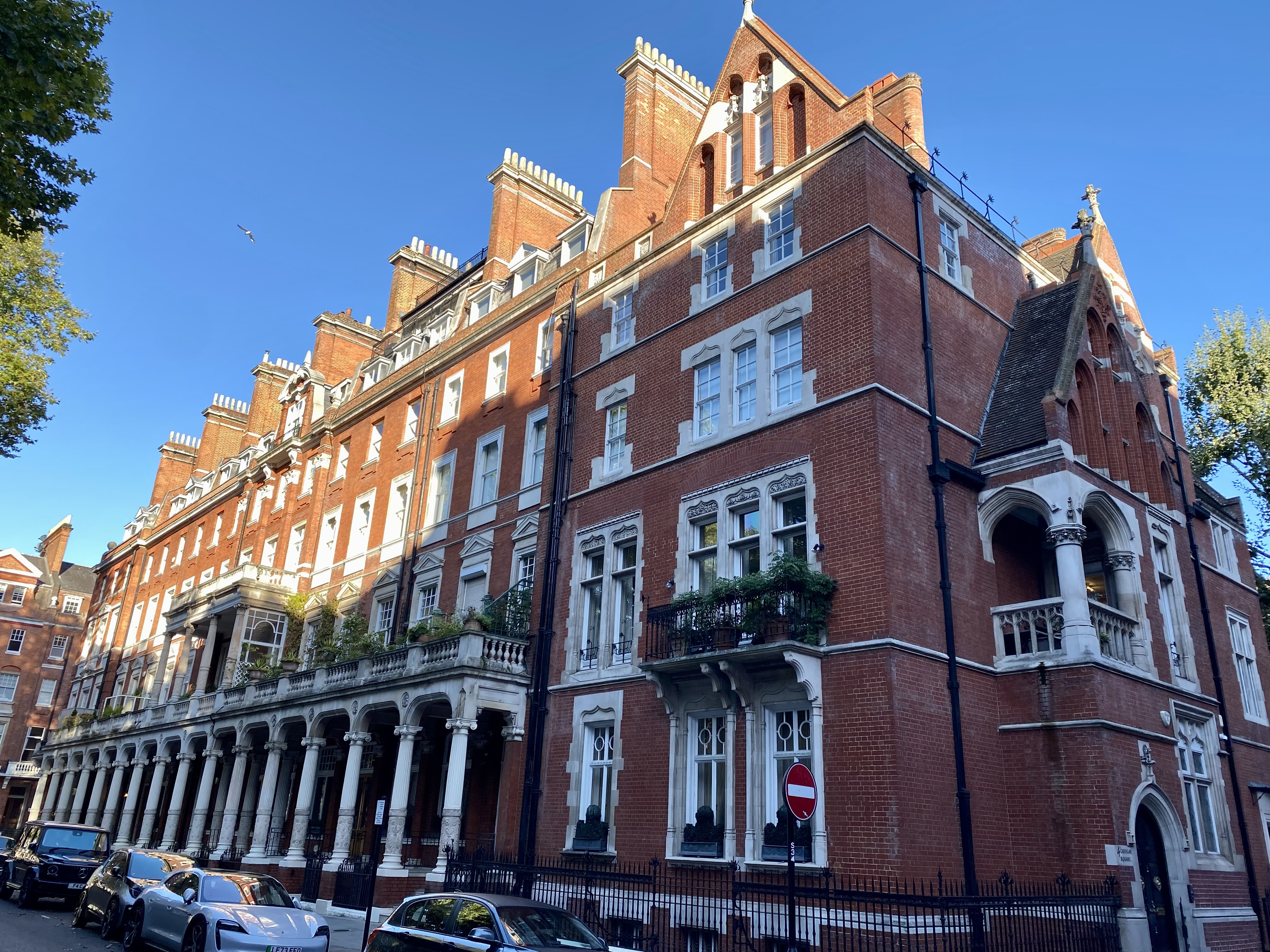
- 4 Cadogan Square (far right)
- Interactive map of the 4 Cadogan Square area

General information
- Type: Residential
- Architectural style: Gothic Revival
- Location: Knightsbridge, London, England
- Coordinates: 51°29′46″N 0°09′38″W
- Completed: 1879

Design and construction
- Architect: George Edmund Street

Listed Building – Grade II*
- Official name: 4 Cadogan Square
- Designated: 15 April 1969
- Reference no.: 1080740

4 Cadogan Square is a Grade II* listed house on Cadogan Square, a garden square in Knightsbridge. The house is in a Gothic style, distinguishing it from other houses on the square.

== History ==
Cadogan Square was developed in the 1870s and 1880s. The house was completed in 1879 for the daughters of James Henry Monk, the Bishop of Gloucester.

== Architecture and design ==
The architect, George Edmund Street primarily worked in church architecture and had designed St James the Less for Monk. Street's Gothic style is displayed on 4 Cadogan Square making it unique in an area of houses otherwise built in Queen Anne Revival or "Pont Street Dutch" styles.

The house features a stone balcony on its east side, as well as intricate ironwork common in Street's designs.

== See also ==
- Cadogan Square
- George Edmund Street
