= Cadogan Square =

Square in Knightsbridge, London, England

Coordinates: 51°29′43″N 0°09′38″W

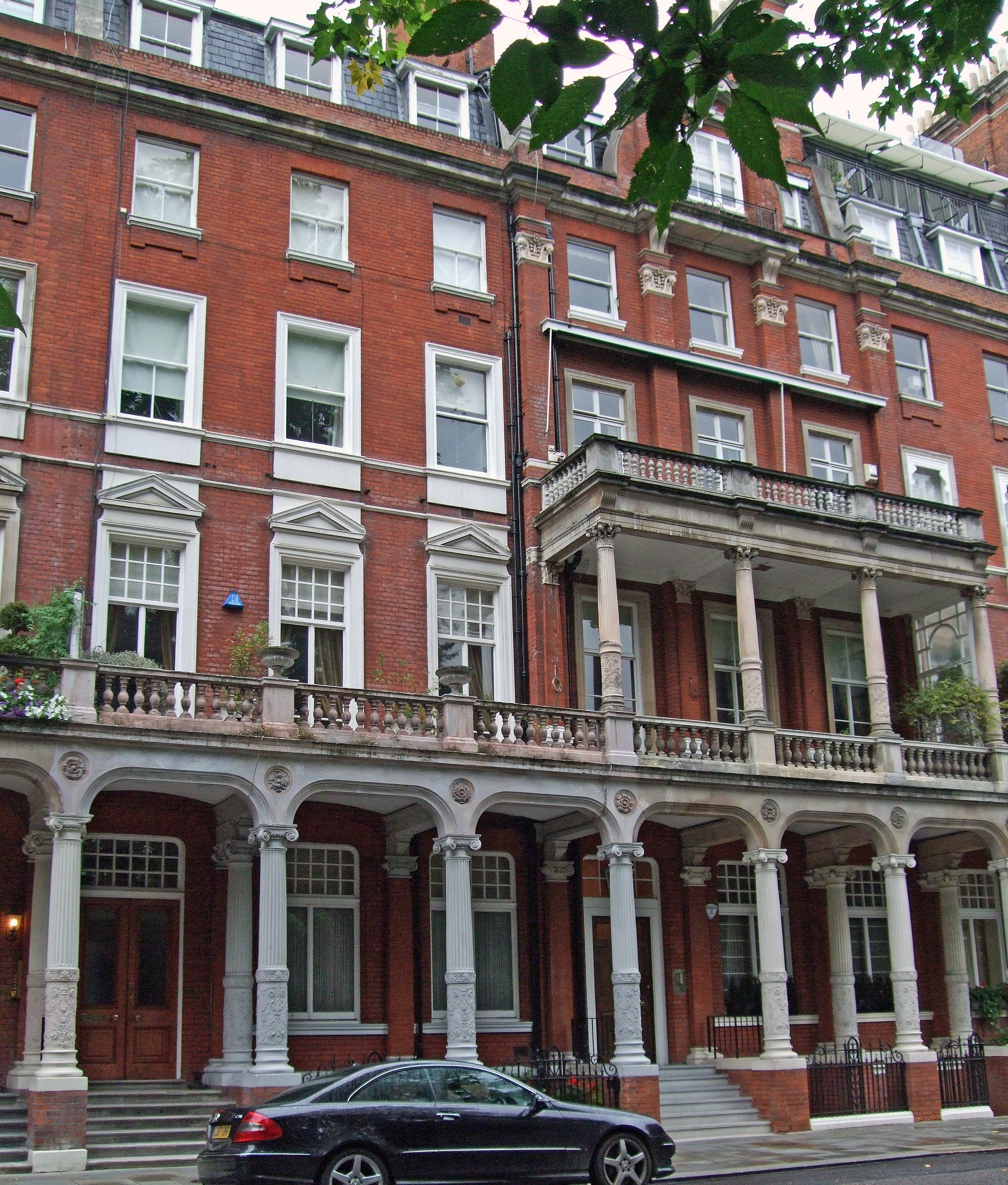
Buildings on the north side of the square

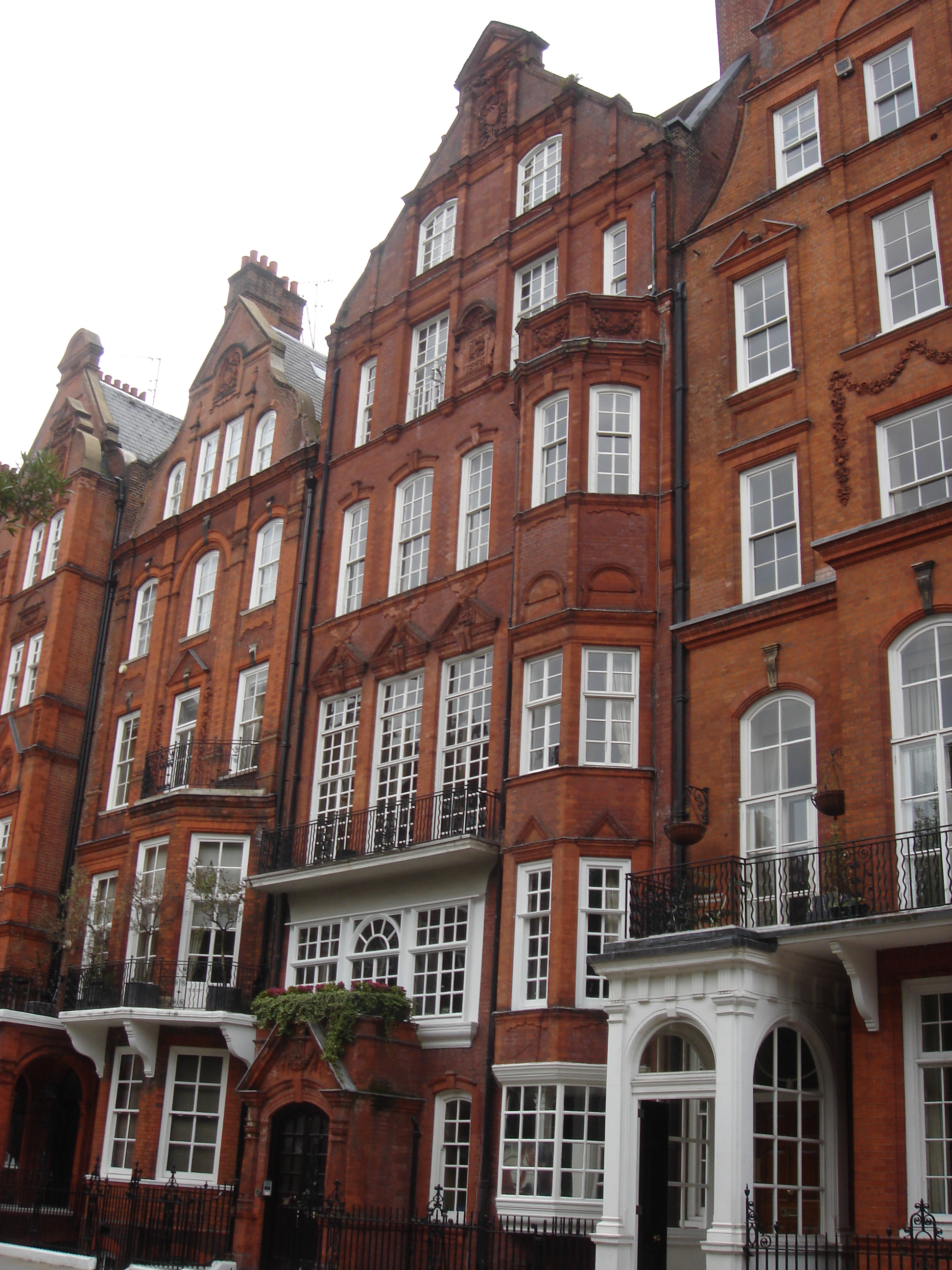
Sussex House School at number 68

Cadogan Square (/kəˈdʌɡən/) is a garden square in the Chelsea area of London, which was named after Earl Cadogan. Whilst it is mainly a residential area, some of the properties are used for diplomatic and educational purposes (notably Sussex House School).

The square is known for being one of the most expensive residential streets in the United Kingdom, with an average house price of around £5.75 million in 2013. Milner Street runs from the middle of the west side of the square.

== History ==
Map

The square was built between 1877 and 1888, largely on the grounds of the Prince's Club.

The west side has the greatest variety of houses, all variations on the same Flemish-influenced theme. Numbers 54-58 were designed by William Young in 1877 for Lord Cadogan, and the architect J. J. Stevenson was largely responsible for the south side, built in 1879–85.

The east side was built in 1879 by G. T. Robinson. Number 61 is an early example of high-class mansion flats, and number 61A was once a studio-house for a Mr F. W. Lawson.

Film stars Christopher Lee and Boris Karloff lived in Cadogan Square, as well as stop motion animator Ray Harryhausen. The Anglo-Irish fantasy writer Lord Dunsany lived in the square in the 1920s and English writer Arnold Bennett lived at number 75 during the same decade. 81 Cadogan Square was where the American socialite Barbara Daly Baekeland was murdered by her son Antony in November, 1972. American war correspondent and author Martha Gellhorn lived in Cadogan Square until her death in 1998.

== Today ==
Cadogan Square is one of the most desirable residential addresses in London and is one of the most expensive in the United Kingdom. It is formed of a garden (restricted to residents) surrounded by red-brick houses, the majority of which have been converted into flats or apartments. The square is south of Pont Street, east of Lennox Gardens, and west of Sloane Street.

A prominent independent prep school, Sussex House School, located at number 68, was founded here in 1952: the school is sited in a house by architect Norman Shaw. Hill House's lower, middle, and upper schools (boys and girls aged five to ten) are educated in a building parallel to Pavilion Road, at what they, as a school, call 'Cadogan Gardens’, although the school is not actually situated next to the gardens.

Apartments or flats tend to be available on short leases and are sold for several million pounds. There are three or so houses on the square that have not been converted into flats, and these may be valued at over £25 million each. In 2013, the average property price on Cadogan Square was about £5.75 million, making it the third most expensive street in the country.

The freeholder of most of the properties is the Earl Cadogan, a multi-billionaire whose family has owned the land for several hundred years. As with many properties in prime central London areas, many of the apartments in Cadogan Square are unoccupied for a large part of the year.

Numbers 4, 52, 62 and 62b, 68, 72 are all Grade II* listed buildings. Stuart House at 84 is Grade II listed.
