= Hostile dependency =

Psychological concept

According to the work of Knight Aldrich (1966), hostile dependency is a relationship orientation characterized by the need of relationship members to be dependent on a partner who is hostile or mistrusting of other people.

== Relationship characteristics ==
Hostile-dependent relationships are characterized by either one sided, or a mutual atmosphere of hostility and aggression between the partners, which are endured due to the dependence of the partners involved (Aldrich, 1966). Since the members of the relationship are dependent on one another, these characteristics can express themselves in complementary ways. For example, between spouses where one is a sadist and the other a masochist, however many other forms are possible, for example, as abusive spousal relationships or in parental relationships with their dependent children (both young, teen and adult children) and in other circumstances of dependency. Many members of hostile-dependent relationships remain together, despite the conflict between one another.

== Development ==
In the case of adults, the need to be dependent upon someone who is hostile or mistrusting of others develops when an individual does not satisfy their need for security earlier in their life (Markovic, 1999). Dr. Maurice Martin (1968) suggests that neurotic, unconscious needs for security motivate hostile-dependent individuals to pursue romantic relationships and that most of these relationships fail due to the overwhelming nature of the hostile-dependent individual's needs. Hostile-dependent relationships develop when two individuals who are hostile themselves become attracted to one another through their hostility.

== Treatment ==
According to Dr. Maurice Martin (1968), treatment for hostile dependency is possible and should be performed using psychoanalytic methods to examine the unconscious neurosis of the spouses. More specifically, the neuroses that result from the unconscious conflict caused by unfulfilled gender-specific developmental milestones must be examined and confronted by the therapist and the client. Confrontation is done using somewhat existential therapeutic methods designed to improve a patient's self-esteem and sense of meaning in life. Treatment also involves a systematic restructuring of the marital relationship that involves the teaching of communication and problem-solving skills (Williams, Trick, & Troum, 1981).

Unfortunately, therapy is often subjected to counter-transference (Martin, 1968). In other words, the therapist is highly prone to becoming involved in the conflict between spouses. Martin (1968) recommends remaining objective and to avoid acting as a judge or advice-giver in order for therapy to succeed.

== Paranoid personality disorder syndrome ==
One of the observations often made by therapists who have tried to treat hostile dependency is the degradation of trust between the spouses to the point of paranoid behavior (Martin, 1968). Conflicts between the spouses escalate to the point that both have internalized the anger and negativity of the relationship, resulting in depression. Through their depression, patients have begun to lose their trust in one another and become suspicious of each other's motivations and actions (Martin, 1968). Paranoid ideation can manifest itself in one spouse when they are actively aggressive towards the other spouse, who then reciprocates with passive aggression (Williams, Trick, & Troum, 1981). This pattern of mistrust was sometimes called "Paranoid Wife Syndrome" (Martin, 1968). However, this term is now outdated.

An investigation of the early relationship between couples that experience what was formerly referred to as Paranoid Wife Syndrome, but not more widely referred to as paranoid personality disorder, tends to show a strong attraction between the spouses when they first began their romantic relationship (Williams, Trick, & Troum, 1981). Both spouses might recount a strong compatibility between the two of them. These strong, positive feelings reflect the security needs of the spouses that developed out of their early experiences. They work well together as a couple because they complement one another's neurosis. Through the course of the marriage, a series of negative interactions, influenced by neurotic motivations, between the spouses will reveal their anxieties to one another and result in the development of the syndrome (Williams, Trick, & Troum, 1981).

== Relationship to other psychoanalytical perspectives on marriage ==
In Zorica Markovic's (1999) comparison of psychoanalytic conceptions of marital relationships, similarities are drawn between Knight Adrich's (1966) observations of hostile-dependent relationship styles and Bela Mittelmann's work on aggressive relationships. Mittelmann outlines a reciprocal and neurotic relationship orientation where partners are complementary in a way that creates a self-perpetuating cycle of tension. Like hostile-dependent relationships, the partners in these couples have neurotic needs that develop from early life experiences and create conflict within the relationship. Unlike hostile-dependent relationships, Mittelmann's model does not involve the development of suspicion or paranoia between spouses.

== See also ==
- Codependency
