= Savage Grace =

- Theatrical release poster
- Directed by: Tom Kalin
- Screenplay by: Howard A. Rodman
- Based on: Savage Grace by Natalie Robins; Steven M.L. Aronson
- Produced by: Iker Monfort; Katie Roumel; Pamela Koffler; Christine Vachon
- Starring: Julianne Moore; Stephen Dillane; Eddie Redmayne; Elena Anaya; Unax Ugalde; Belén Rueda; Hugh Dancy
- Cinematography: Juan Miguel Azpiroz
- Edited by: John F. Lyons
- Music by: Fernando Velázquez
- Distributed by: IFC Films
- Release dates: May 18, 2007 (Cannes Film Festival); May 28, 2008 (United States, limited release)
- Running time: 97 minutes
- Countries: France; Spain; United States
- Language: English

Savage Grace is a 2007 drama film directed by Tom Kalin and written by Howard A. Rodman, based on the book Savage Grace by Natalie Robins and Steven M. L. Aronson. The story is based on the highly dysfunctional relationship between heiress and socialite Barbara Daly Baekeland and her son, Antony. The film stars Julianne Moore, Stephen Dillane, Eddie Redmayne, Elena Anaya, and Hugh Dancy.

It was an official selection at the 2007 London Film Festival, the 2007 Sundance Film Festival and the 2007 Cannes Film Festival.

== Synopsis ==
The film is based on the true story of Barbara Daly Baekeland (Moore), her husband Brooks Baekeland (Dillane), heir to the Bakelite plastics fortune, and their only child Antony (Redmayne), who was diagnosed with schizophrenia. The story begins with Antony's birth and follows the family to the time of his arrest for the murder of his mother.

== Cast ==
- Julianne Moore as Barbara Daly Baekeland
- Eddie Redmayne as Antony Baekeland
- Stephen Dillane as Brooks Baekeland
- Elena Anaya as Blanca
- Unax Ugalde as Black Jake Martínez
- Belén Rueda as Pilar Durán
- Hugh Dancy as Samuel Adams Green

== Critical reception ==
Critics gave the film mixed reviews. The review aggregator Rotten Tomatoes has a 38% of approval, based on 96 reviews — the consensus reads "though visually compelling, the lamentable characters in Savage Grace make for difficult viewing." Metacritic, another review aggregator, reported the film had an average score of 51 out of 100, based on 28 reviews.

Peter Bradshaw writing in The Guardian gave the film four out of five stars, describing it as "a gripping, coldly brilliant and tremendously acted movie."

== Accolades ==
Savage Grace was nominated for an Independent Spirit Award for Best Screenplay in 2008.

== Sam Green response to the film ==
After the film opened, Baekeland's former lover, Samuel Adams Green (played by Dancy in the film), wrote an article pointing out that elements in the film were factually inaccurate, such as the ménage à trois scene of Barbara, Antony, and Sam having sex.

Green then took legal action against the film makers, which was still unresolved at the time of his death.
