= Barbara Daly Baekeland =

American socialite (1921–1972)

- Born: Barbara Daly; September 28, 1921; Cambridge, Massachusetts, U.S.
- Died: November 17, 1972 (aged 51); Chelsea, London, England
- Cause of death: Murder by stabbing
- Other name: One of New York's Ten Most Beautiful Girls
- Occupations: Socialite; model; actress
- Years active: 1936–1972
- Known for: Being murdered by her son with whom she allegedly had an incestuous relationship
- Spouse: Brooks Baekeland (m. 1942; div. 1968)
- Partner(s): John Jacob Astor VI (1939–1941); Samuel Adams Green (1969–1969)
- Children: Antony Baekeland (1946–1981)
- Relatives: Leo Baekeland (grandfather-in-law)

Barbara Daly Baekeland (September 28, 1921 – November 17, 1972) was an American socialite who was the ex-wife of Brooks Baekeland, the grandson of Bakelite inventor Leo Baekeland. Barbara was widely known as one of New York City's "ten most beautiful girls" during the late 1930s and 1940s. She was murdered at her London home when her son, Antony Baekeland, stabbed her with a kitchen knife, killing her almost instantly. Antony was found at the scene of the crime, and later confessed to and was charged with her murder.

== Early life ==
Barbara Daly was born and raised in Cambridge, Massachusetts. In September 1932, when Barbara was aged 11, her father Frank died by suicide via carbon monoxide poisoning from the exhaust of his car in the family's garage. After his death, Barbara and her mother moved to New York City, taking up residence in the Delmonico Hotel in Lenox Hill, Manhattan.

== Career ==
As a young woman, Barbara became a prominent socialite. After moving to Manhattan's Delmonico Hotel with her mother, Nina ("Nini") Daly, in the late 1930s, Barbara became a prominent socialite. Recognized for her beauty, she posed for portrait painters and modeled in fashion magazines such as Vogue and Harper's Bazaar. Her social status and beauty resulted in frequent invitations to high society parties. Encouraged by her mother, she used her modeling work and social status to gain frequent invitations to high-society parties. During this period, she also struggled with mental health issues similar to her mother's and became a private patient of psychiatrist Foster Kennedy.

Her magazine exposure eventually led to an invitation to Hollywood for a screen test opposite actor Dana Andrews. Although the screen test did not lead to film stardom, while in California she befriended fellow aspiring actress Cornelia "Dickie" Baekeland, who introduced Barbara to her younger brother Brooks, a trainee pilot with the Royal Canadian Air Force. Barbara ended her modeling career following her 1942 marriage to Baekeland, though she remained a prominent figure in international society and was known for wearing Haute couture by designers such as Balenciaga, Givenchy, and Chanel.

== Personal life ==
After moving to New York City with her mother, Nina ("Nini") Daly, in the late 1930s, Daly worked as a model for publications such as Vogue and Harper's Bazaar and entered Manhattan's high-society circuit. Between 1939 and 1941, she was pursued by shipping and real estate heir John Jacob Astor VI while still legally married to his first wife, Ellen Tuck French, at the time and entered into a high-profile relationship with him, a match actively encouraged by her mother. Following the end of the relationship in 1941, Daly traveled to Los Angeles for a screen test, where she met Brooks Baekeland.

== Marriage ==
After Barbara falsely told Brooks Baekeland that she was pregnant, the couple quickly married in California. At the time of the marriage, Barbara listed her profession as painter, while Brooks listed his as writer.

After the marriage the couple set up home in a luxury apartment on the Upper East Side of Manhattan in New York, where they held extravagant dinner parties for their friends, who included Greta Garbo, Tennessee Williams, William Styron. Over time, Barbara became well known to many for her unstable personality, rude outbursts, and bouts of severe depression. She also drank heavily, and both she and her husband participated in extramarital affairs.

Barbara gave birth to a son, Antony Baekeland, on August 28, 1946.

From the summer of 1954 onward, with Antony aged eight, the Baekeland family led a nomadic seasonal existence, maintaining their home in New York while being mainly based in Europe. Renting houses and villas in London, Paris, Zermatt, Cap d'Antibes, and many parts of Italy, Barbara and Brooks continued to live extravagantly, entertain guests, and have affairs. From 1960 onward, the family's main base was an apartment in Paris, where during one party, Brooks met an English diplomat's daughter who was 15 years his junior. After Brooks requested a divorce and Barbara subsequently attempted suicide, Brooks terminated the affair.

In 1967, with the family based in Switzerland and the Catalan resort of Cadaques in Spain, the 20-year-old Antony met Jake Cooper, a bisexual Australian man. Cooper introduced Antony to various hallucinogenic drugs, which they traveled to Morocco to obtain. Antony and Cooper also allegedly began an affair at this time, though this is denied by Cooper. When Mrs. Baekeland was informed of this by her friend Barbara Curteis, she traveled by car to Spain to bring her son back to Switzerland. However, at the French border, Antony was found not to have his passport. After the ensuing fracas, both Antony and Barbara were arrested and placed in jail.

=== Divorce ===
Returning to Spain, Barbara accepted the extent of her son's relationship with Cooper, but preferred his developing relationship with a young Spanish girl, Sylvie. However, Sylvie then started an affair with Barbara's husband Brooks. After discovering the affair in February 1968, Barbara again attempted suicide. Brooks proceeded to pursue a divorce. This led Barbara to severe depression and another suicide attempt, from which her friend Gloria Jones, wife of author James Jones, saved her.

Brooks married Sylvie and had one son. They later divorced and he married Susan Baekeland.

In 1969, Barbara met noted pop art curator Samuel Adams Green, with whom she started a relationship. When later introduced to her son Antony, Green was very unimpressed by his artistic capabilities. After six weeks, Green broke off the relationship, although Barbara was still obsessed with him. She pursued Green relentlessly; when she returned to the United States that fall, she walked barefoot across Central Park in the snow wearing nothing but a lynx fur coat to demand entry to his apartment.

== Relationship with son ==
Barbara Baekeland had a complex and allegedly incestuous relationship with her son, Antony Baekeland, who was either gay or bisexual. Baekeland attempted to "fix" her son by hiring prostitutes to have sex with him. After this failed, while the pair were living in Majorca in the summer of 1968 following Barbara and Brooks's divorce, Barbara was alleged to have raped her son.

During his young adulthood, Antony displayed increasingly regular signs of schizophrenia with paranoid tendencies, and his erratic behaviour caused concern among family friends. He was eventually diagnosed with schizophrenia; however, his father initially refused to allow him to be treated by psychiatrists, a profession he believed to be "amoral".

== Murder ==
In late July 1972, Antony tried to throw his mother under the traffic outside her penthouse on Cadogan Square in Chelsea, London. She was only saved by his physical weakness, and the intervention of her friend Susan Guinness. Although the Metropolitan Police arrested Antony for attempted murder, Barbara refused to press charges. Antony was subsequently admitted to The Priory private psychiatric hospital, but was released soon afterwards.

Antony then undertook sessions with a psychiatrist while living at home. The doctor became so concerned about Antony's condition that on October 30, he warned Barbara that he was capable of murder. Barbara dismissed the doctor's assertion.

Two weeks later, on November 17, 1972, Antony murdered his mother by stabbing her with a kitchen knife, killing her almost instantly. She was 51 years of age at the time, and Antony was 26. Police arrived and found Antony at the scene of the crime. He later confessed to, and was charged with, her murder.

Antony was institutionalised at Broadmoor Hospital until July 21, 1980, when, at the urging of a group of his friends, he was released.

=== Antony's death ===
Upon his release, Antony, then aged 33, flew directly to New York City to stay with his 87-year-old maternal grandmother, Nina Daly. Only six days after his release, on July 27, he attacked her with a kitchen knife, stabbing her eight times and breaking several bones. He was then arrested by the New York City Police Department, charged with attempted murder and sent to Rikers Island prison.

After eight months of assessment by the psychiatric team at Rikers Island, he was expecting to be released on bail at a court hearing on March 20, 1981. However, the case was adjourned by the judge due to a delay in the transfer of his medical records from the UK. Antony returned to his cell at 3:30 PM EST on March 20, 1981, and was found dead by suicide 30 minutes later, having suffocated himself with a plastic bag.

== Savage Grace ==
The 2007 film Savage Grace is based on the life of Barbara and Antony Baekeland, beginning with Antony's birth and following the family to the time of Antony's arrest for the murder of his mother. The movie–starring Julianne Moore, Stephen Dillane, Eddie Redmayne, Hugh Dancy, Elena Anaya, and Unax Ugalde–was based on the book of the same name.

After the film opened, Barbara Baekeland's former lover Samuel Adams Green wrote an article pointing out elements in the film that could be potentially misleading for those trying to read back to the reality inspiring it. He referred in particular to the ménage à trois scene, which depicted Barbara, Antony, and Sam Green in bed together having sex. Green wrote:

It is true that almost 40 years ago I did have an affair with Barbara, but I certainly never slept with her son, nor am I bisexual. She started telling people she had had an incestuous relationship with her son as a way of 'curing' him of homosexuality ... But I don't believe she had sex with Tony. I think she simply enjoyed shocking people.

Green then embarked on legal action against the filmmakers, which was still unresolved at the time of his death in 2011.

== Sources ==
- Robins, Natalie, and Steven M.L. Aronson (1985). Savage Grace. New York: William Morrow & Co. ISBN 0-688-04373-9. LCCN 85-7117

Reissued in the U.S. as Savage Grace: the true story of fatal relations in a rich and famous American family (Simon & Schuster Touchstone, 2007, OCLC 176925680). Sometimes issued in the U.K. as Savage Grace: the true story of a doomed family
