= Antony Baekeland =

American socialite (1946–1981)

- Born: Antony Baekeland; 28 August 1946; New York City, U.S.
- Died: 20 March 1981 (aged 34); The Bronx, Rikers Island, U.S.
- Other name: Tony Baekeland
- Occupations: Socialite; painter; artist
- Years active: 1967–1981
- Parent: Barbara Daly Baekeland (mother)
- Relatives: Leo Baekeland (great-grandfather)

Antony "Tony" Baekeland (August 28, 1946 – March 20, 1981) was an American heir to the Bakelite plastics fortune who gained notoriety for the 1972 killing of his mother, socialite Barbara Daly Baekeland, in London. Born into a wealthy and prominent family as the great-grandson of chemist Leo Baekeland, his life was marked by a nomadic childhood, severe familial dysfunction, untreated paranoid schizophrenia, and institutionalization.

After pleading guilty to manslaughter on the grounds of diminished responsibility in 1973, Baekeland was committed to Broadmoor Hospital in Berkshire, England, for nearly eight years. Following his controversial release and repatriation to New York City in July 1980, he attacked and severely injured his 87-year-old maternal grandmother, Nina Daly, six days later. While awaiting trial on Rikers Island in March 1981, he died by suicide in his cell. The history of the Baekeland family became the subject of the 1985 oral history Savage Grace by Natalie Robins and Steven M.L. Aronson, which was adapted into a 2007 feature film.

== Early life ==
Antony Baekeland, known throughout his life to family and friends as Tony, was born on August 28, 1946, in New York City. He was the only child of Brooks Baekeland, a writer and grandson of Belgian-born chemist Leo Hendrik Baekeland, and Barbara Daly, an artist's model and socialite originally from Massachusetts. His parents had married hastily in California after Barbara falsely told Brooks she was pregnant.

During his early childhood, the family resided in a luxury apartment on Manhattan's Upper East Side and entertained figures from the literary and arts worlds, including Greta Garbo, Tennessee Williams, and William Styron. Behind their public image, however, the household was unstable; both parents drank heavily, engaged in extramarital affairs, and quarreled frequently, while Barbara suffered from severe bouts of depression and made multiple suicide attempts.

In the summer of 1954, when Baekeland was eight years old, his parents abandoned settled life in New York for a nomadic existence across Western Europe. Over the next decade, the family rented houses, villas, and apartments in London, Paris, Zermatt, Cap d'Antibes, Mallorca, and Italy. Because of this constant relocation, Baekeland never established permanent roots or consistent formal schooling. From 1960 onward, the family maintained a primary base in Paris, where an eleven- or twelve-year-old Baekeland sat for a portrait by Spanish society painter Alejo Vidal-Quadras.

As an adolescent and young man, Baekeland was described by acquaintances as gentle, polite, and artistically inclined. He played the acoustic guitar, painted, and wrote poetry and short prose. During the family's stays in Paris and the Balearic Islands, his early literary efforts drew encouragement from family friends, including novelist James Jones and English poet Robert Graves.

== Adulthood ==
=== Family breakdown, and mental illness ===
In 1967, while the Baekelands were staying in Switzerland and the Catalan coastal town of Cadaqués, Spain, 20-year-old Baekeland entered a romantic relationship with Jake Cooper, an Australian expatriate. Living within Cadaqués's bohemian artist community, Baekeland spent his time painting, playing music, and socializing. Cooper introduced him to hallucinogenic drugs, including LSD, and the two traveled together to Morocco.

Barbara Baekeland reacted with hostility to her son's homosexuality and sought to alter his sexual orientation. She actively worked to separate him from Cooper and initially encouraged his companionship with a young Spanish woman named Sylvie. In early 1968, however, Brooks Baekeland began an affair with Sylvie, divorced Barbara, and married Sylvie, with whom he later had a son. Following the divorce, Brooks largely severed emotional ties with Antony.

In the summer of 1968, Barbara and Antony relocated to Mallorca. According to witness accounts, family correspondence, and later trial testimony, Barbara hired female prostitutes in an effort to make her son heterosexual. When those efforts failed, Barbara initiated an incestuous sexual relationship with Antony in Mallorca, an arrangement that continued intermittently over the next several years.

During his early twenties, Baekeland began exhibiting acute symptoms of mental illness, including auditory hallucinations, severe paranoia, and erratic mood swings. Although he was diagnosed with paranoid schizophrenia, Brooks Baekeland refused to authorize or fund psychiatric care, dismissing psychiatry as an "amoral" profession. Cut off from his peers and financially dependent on his mother, Baekeland grew increasingly isolated.

=== Killing of Barbara Baekeland ===
In 1971, Barbara and Antony moved to London and rented a duplex apartment at 52 Cadogan Square in the Knightsbridge district. Stripped of the artistic circle he had known in Spain, Baekeland spent most of his time confined to the flat with his mother as his psychosis worsened. Neighbors and acquaintances reported frequent, violent arguments between the two.

In July 1972, while walking on a London street, Baekeland attempted to push his mother into oncoming traffic. Police arrested him on suspicion of attempted murder, but authorities dropped the charges after Barbara refused to press the case. Following the incident, Baekeland was briefly admitted to The Priory, a private psychiatric hospital in London, before being discharged back into his mother's care. He continued outpatient sessions with a psychiatrist, who grew so alarmed by Baekeland's delusions that on October 30, 1972, the doctor formally warned Barbara that her son was capable of murder. Barbara dismissed the warning.

On November 17, 1972, following an argument in the kitchen of their Cadogan Square flat, 26-year-old Baekeland attacked his 51-year-old mother with a kitchen carving knife, stabbing her once in the chest and killing her almost instantly. When Metropolitan Police officers arrived at the residence, they found Baekeland calm and detached, speaking on the telephone to order Chinese takeout while his mother's body lay nearby.

=== Trial and Broadmoor Hospital ===
Baekeland was arrested, charged with murder, and held on remand at Brixton Prison. Prison observers noted that he appeared entirely disconnected from reality, frequently asking visitors how his mother was doing as though she were still alive.

His trial opened at the Central Criminal Court (the Old Bailey) in London on June 6, 1973. Defended by barrister and writer John Mortimer, Baekeland entered a plea of guilty to manslaughter on the grounds of diminished responsibility. Psychiatrists testified regarding his paranoid schizophrenia, his past use of hallucinogens, and the psychological trauma stemming from his relationship with his mother. Mortimer petitioned the court to allow Baekeland to be extradited to the United States for psychiatric treatment, but the judge ordered him detained indefinitely under the Mental Health Act at Broadmoor Hospital, a high-security psychiatric facility in Berkshire.

At Broadmoor, antipsychotic medication reduced Baekeland's acute hallucinations, though clinicians continued to regard him as deeply detached. He spent his days reading, drawing, playing guitar, and writing letters to his maternal grandmother, Nina Daly, and family friends. Because of his family's prominence, he received regular visits from writers and social acquaintances, though his father remained largely absent.

=== 1980 release and second attack ===
By the late 1970s, a group of family friends and his 87-year-old maternal grandmother, Nina "Nini" Daly, petitioned the British Home Office to release Baekeland into Daly's custody in New York City. Despite objections from some medical staff who warned that Baekeland remained dangerous if left unsupervised or unmedicated, British authorities approved his release and deportation.

On July 21, 1980, 33-year-old Baekeland was discharged from Broadmoor and placed on a commercial flight to New York. No arrangement was made to transfer him directly into an American psychiatric facility, nor were his British medical records forwarded promptly to New York clinicians. Baekeland moved into his grandmother's apartment on Manhattan's Upper East Side, where he spent hours playing music beside a small display of his mother's ashes, photographs, and candles.

Six days after returning to New York, on July 27, 1980, Baekeland stabbed his grandmother, Nina Daly, multiple times with a kitchen knife. Daly survived the assault and blamed her grandson's untreated mental illness rather than him personally. Baekeland was arrested, charged with attempted murder, and detained at Rikers Island.

== Personal life ==
In his late teens and early twenties, Baekeland's sexuality became a major source of friction within his family. In 1967, while living in Spain, he entered a romantic relationship with Jake Cooper, an Australian expatriate.

== Death ==
In March 1981, after a court hearing was adjourned due to missing medical records from the United Kingdom, the 34-year-old Baekeland died by suicide in his cell via suffocation.

== In popular culture ==
- Savage Grace (1985): Journalists Natalie Robins and Steven M.L. Aronson documented the family's history in the oral history Savage Grace: The True Story of Fatal Relations in a Rich and Famous American Family, compiled from extensive interviews and archives.
- Savage Grace (2007): The book was adapted into a biographical drama film directed by Tom Kalin and written by Howard A. Rodman, starring Eddie Redmayne as Antony Baekeland and Julianne Moore as Barbara Daly Baekeland.

== Sources ==
- Robins, Natalie, and Steven M.L. Aronson (1985). Savage Grace. New York: William Morrow & Co. ISBN 0-688-04373-9. LCCN 85-7117

Reissued in the U.S. as Savage Grace: the true story of fatal relations in a rich and famous American family (Simon & Schuster Touchstone, 2007, OCLC 176925680). Sometimes issued in the U.K. as Savage Grace: the true story of a doomed family
