= Cheyne Walk =

Street in Chelsea, London

Coordinates: 51.4823°N 0.1727°W

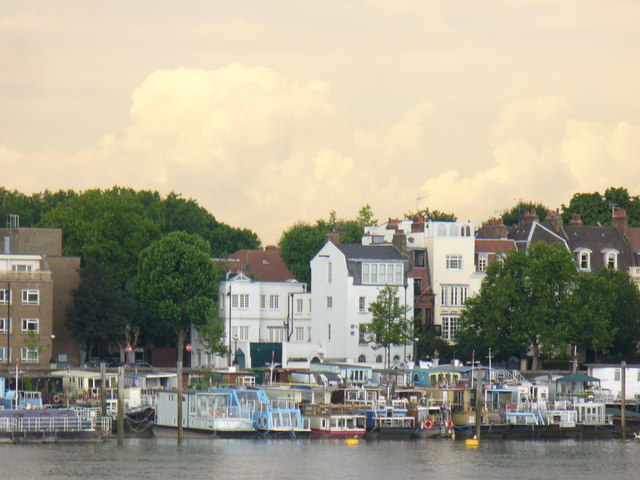
Cheyne Walk seen from across the river

Cheyne Walk is a historic road in Chelsea, London, England, in the Royal Borough of Kensington and Chelsea. It runs parallel with the River Thames. Before the construction of Chelsea Embankment reduced the width of the Thames here, it fronted the river along its whole length.

== Location ==
At its western end, Cheyne Walk meets Cremorne Road end-on at the junction with Lots Road. The Walk runs alongside the River Thames until Battersea Bridge where, for a short distance, it is replaced by Chelsea Embankment with part of its former alignment being occupied by Ropers Gardens. East of Old Church Street and Chelsea Old Church, the Walk runs along the north side of Albert Bridge Gardens and Chelsea Embankment Gardens parallel with Chelsea Embankment. At the north end of Albert Bridge, the Walk merges with Chelsea Embankment. The Walk ends at Royal Hospital Road.

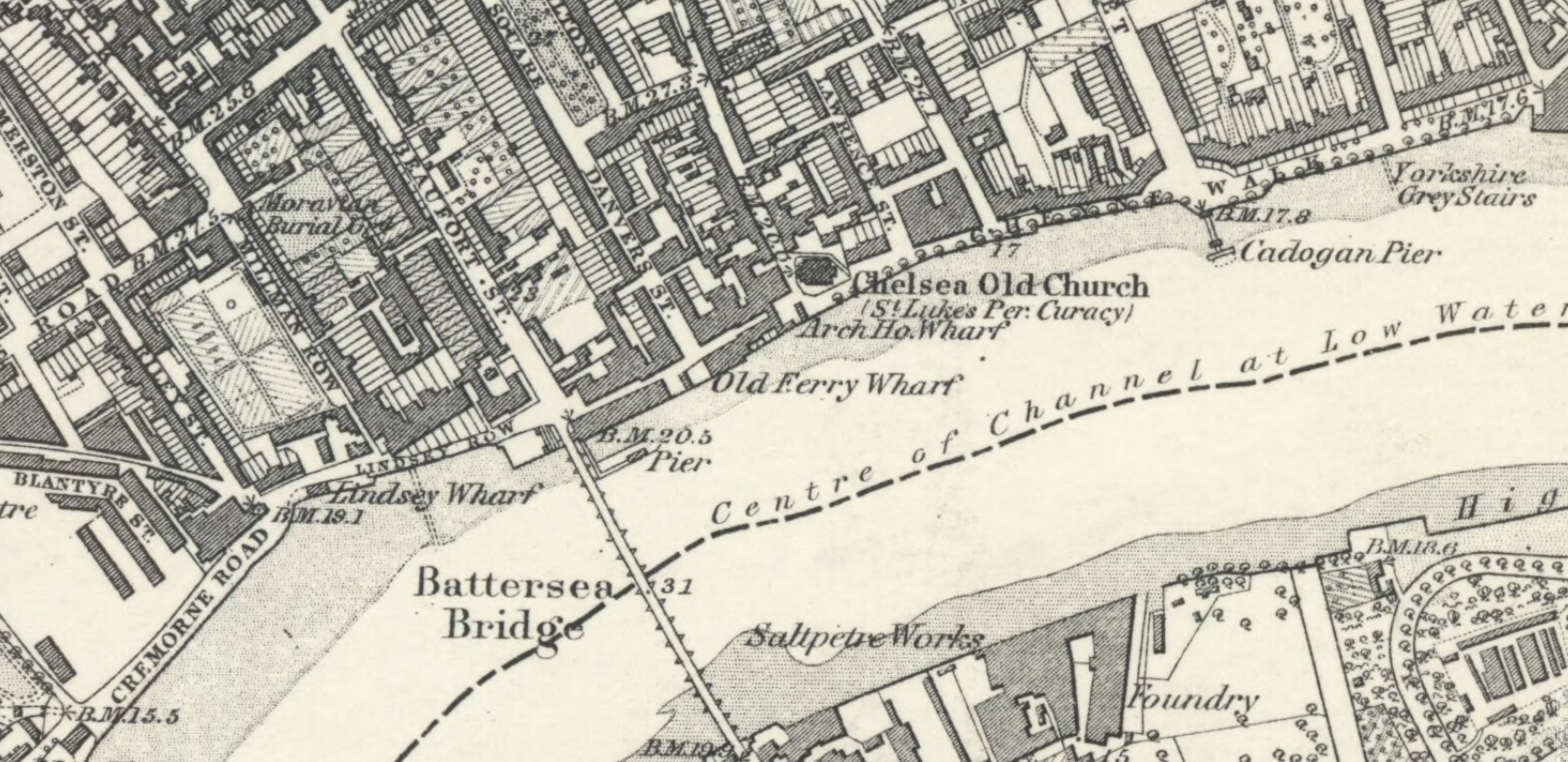
Before (1866)

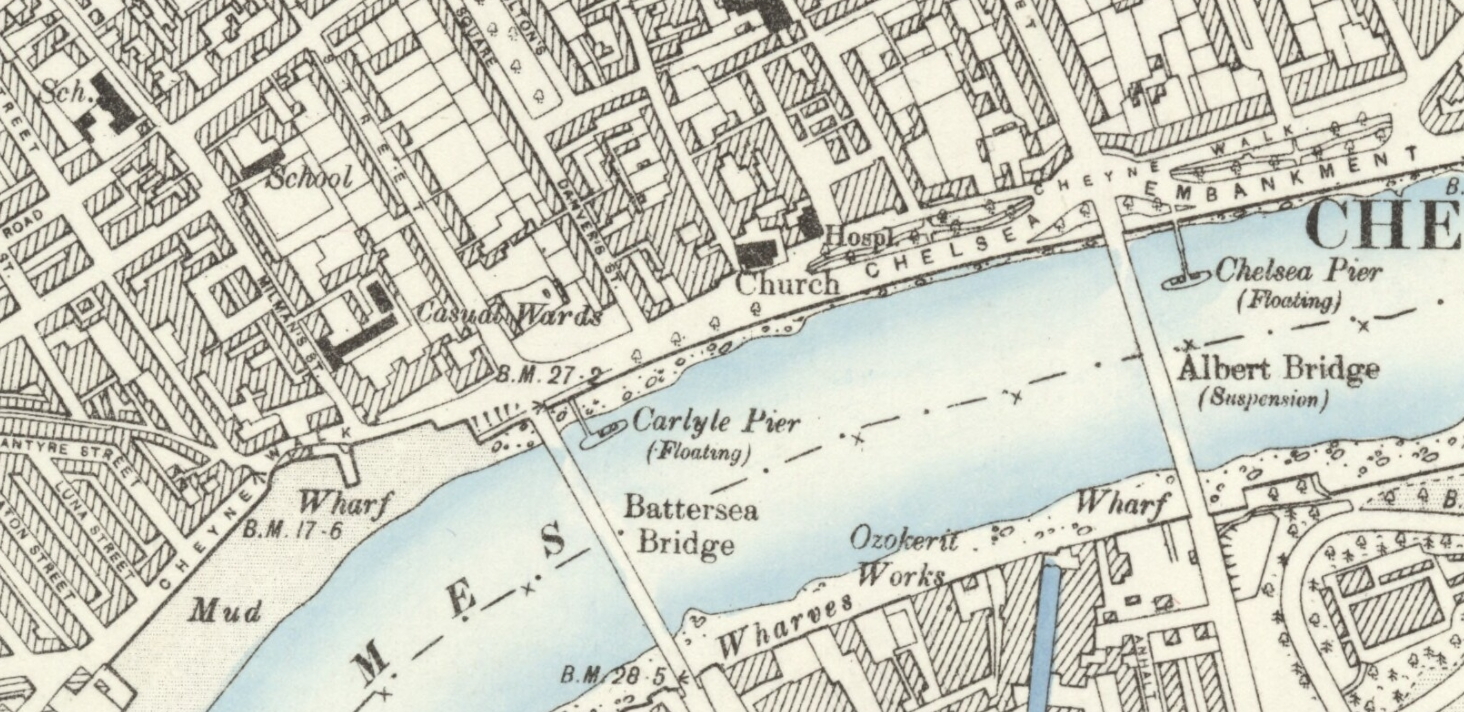
After (1895)

Cheyne Walk before and after construction of Chelsea Embankment

At the western end between Lots Road and Battersea Bridge is a collection of residential houseboats that have been in situ since the 1930s. At the eastern end is the Chelsea Physic Garden with its cedars. It marks the boundary of the, now withdrawn, extended London Congestion Charge Zone. The section west of Battersea Bridge forms part of the A3220 road.

== History ==
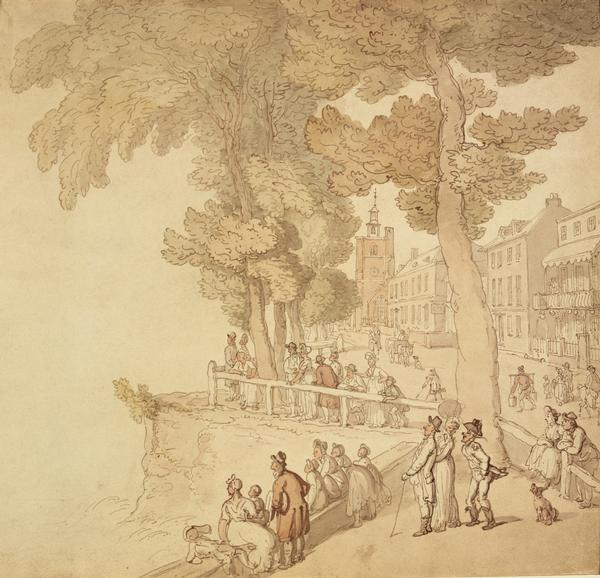
Cheyne Walk circa 1800.

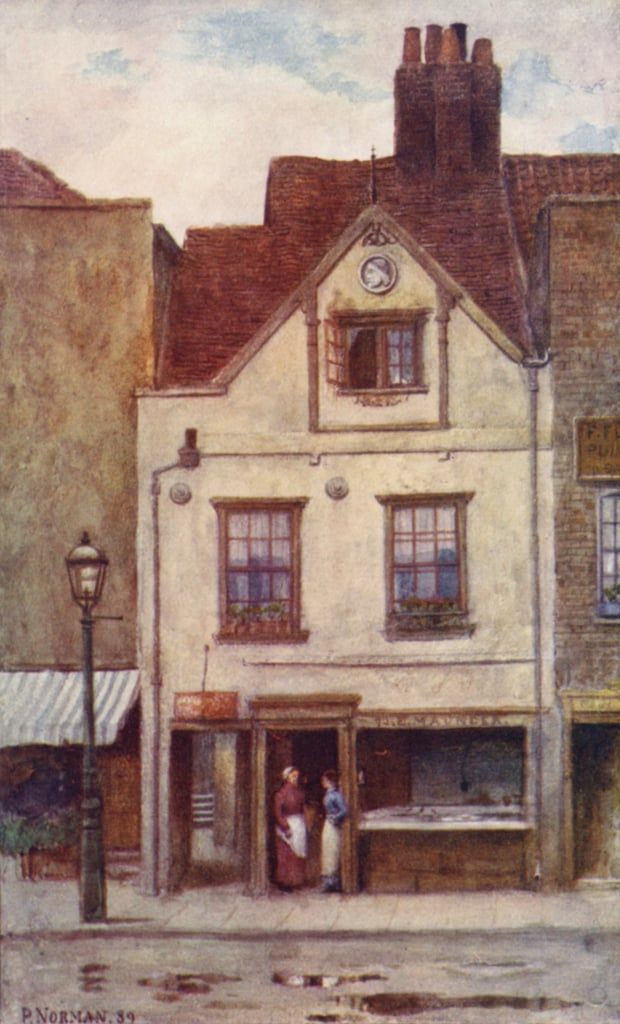
Maunders Fish Shop, Cheyne Walk, 1887 by Philip Norman

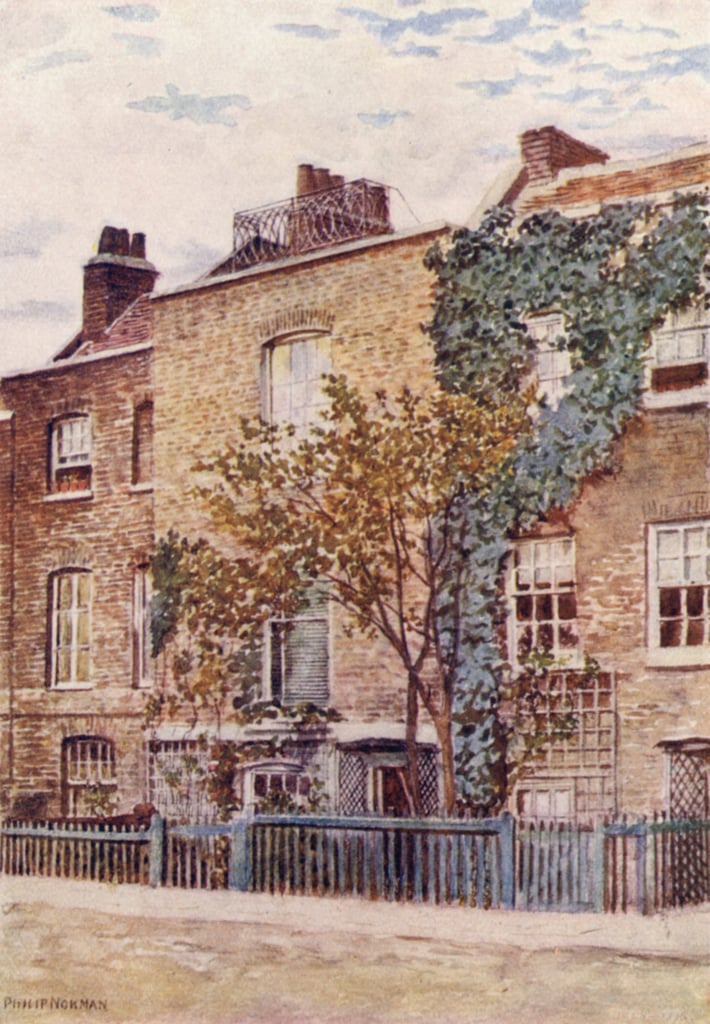
Turners House, Cheyne Walk, Chelsea, 1887 by Philip Norman

Cheyne Walk takes its name from William Cheyne, Viscount Newhaven who owned the manor of Chelsea until 1712. Most of the houses were built in the early 18th century. Before the construction in the 19th century of the busy Chelsea Embankment, which now runs in front of it, the houses fronted the River Thames. The most prominent building is Carlyle Mansions.

Prior to the 18th century construction, Cheyne Walk was the site of Chelsea Manor, built by Henry VIII in the 1530s. Chelsea Old Church dates from 1157 and Crosby Hall is a reconstructed medieval merchant's house relocated from the City of London in 1910.

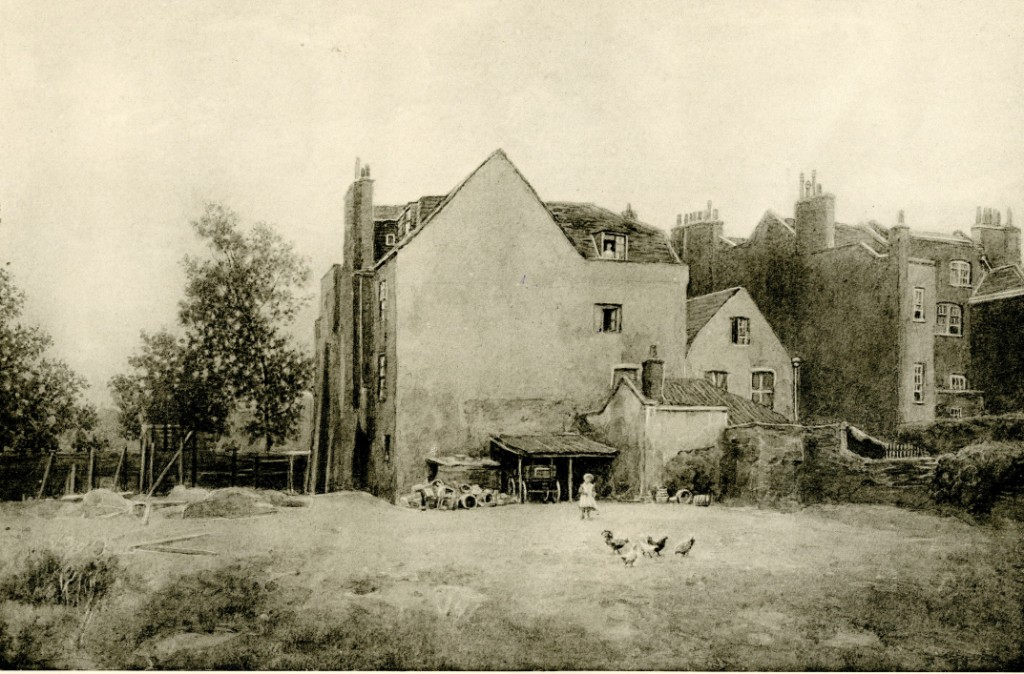
Back of old houses Cheyne Walk 1907 by Philip Norman

In 1951, the Metropolitan Borough of Chelsea planned to construct a new river wall straightening the river bank west of Battersea Bridge. On the reclaimed land behind the wall a new arterial road and public gardens were to be constructed. Cheyne Walk was to remain unchanged to the north of the new public gardens. The works would have reduced the foreshore and required the removal of the house boat berths. The works did not take place. In the 1960s, plans for the Greater London Council's London Motorway Box project would have seen the West Cross Route, a motorway standard elevated road, constructed from Battersea to Harlesden through Earl's Court. A spur road would have been constructed from the motorway to the junction of Cheyne Walk and Lots Road. The plans were abandoned because of the cost and opposition from local communities.

Brunel House at 105-106 Cheyne Walk was designed by Frederick MacManus and Partners Architects in the 1950s and was awarded the RIBA London Architecture Bronze Medal for 1957.

In 1972, number 96 Cheyne Walk, the then home of Philip Woodfield, a British civil servant, was the site of a top secret meeting between the British government and the leadership of the Provisional IRA aimed at ending the violence in Northern Ireland. The talks were inconclusive and the violence soon started again.

== Notable residents ==
Many famous people have lived (and continue to live) in the Walk:

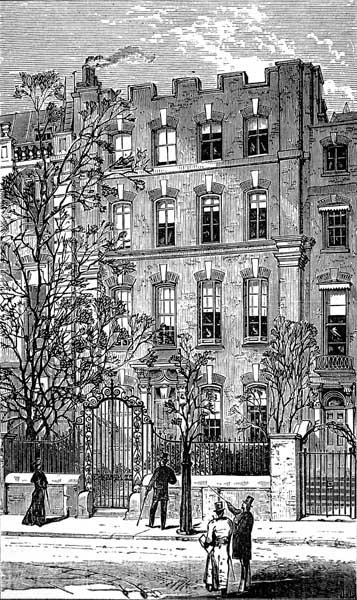
4 Cheyne Walk, shown here in 1881, was briefly the home of George Eliot

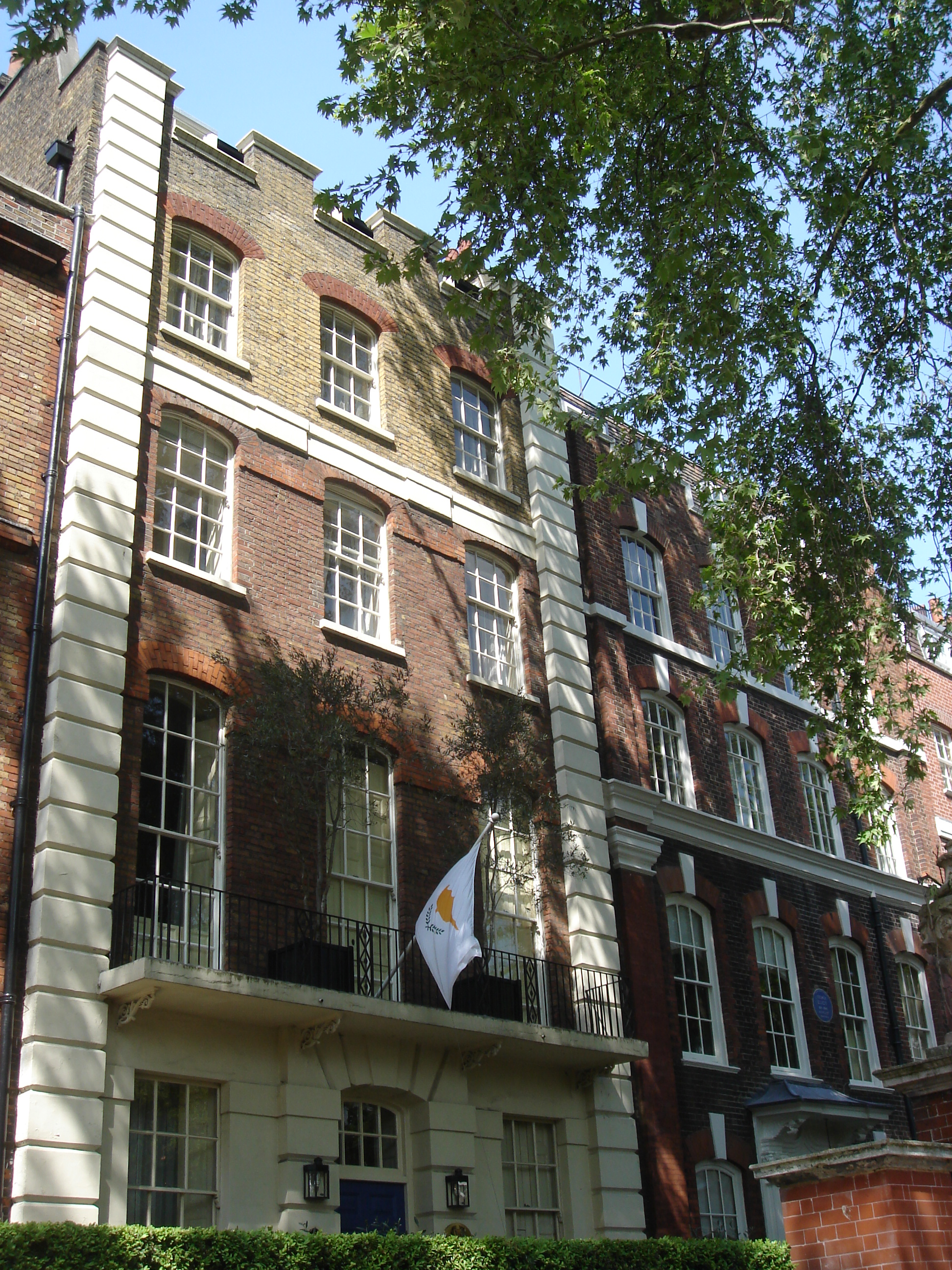
4 and 5 Cheyne Walk

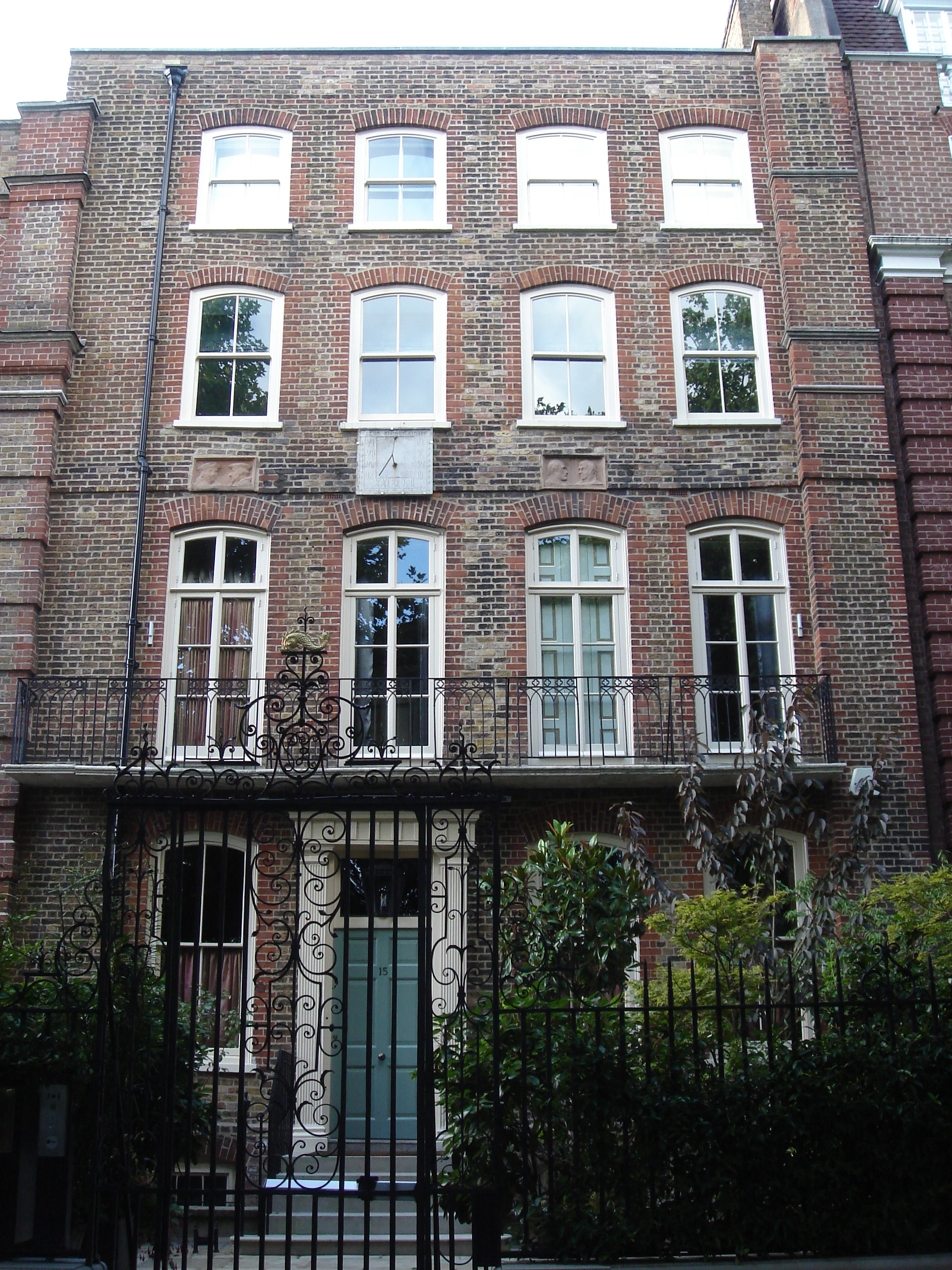
15 Cheyne Walk

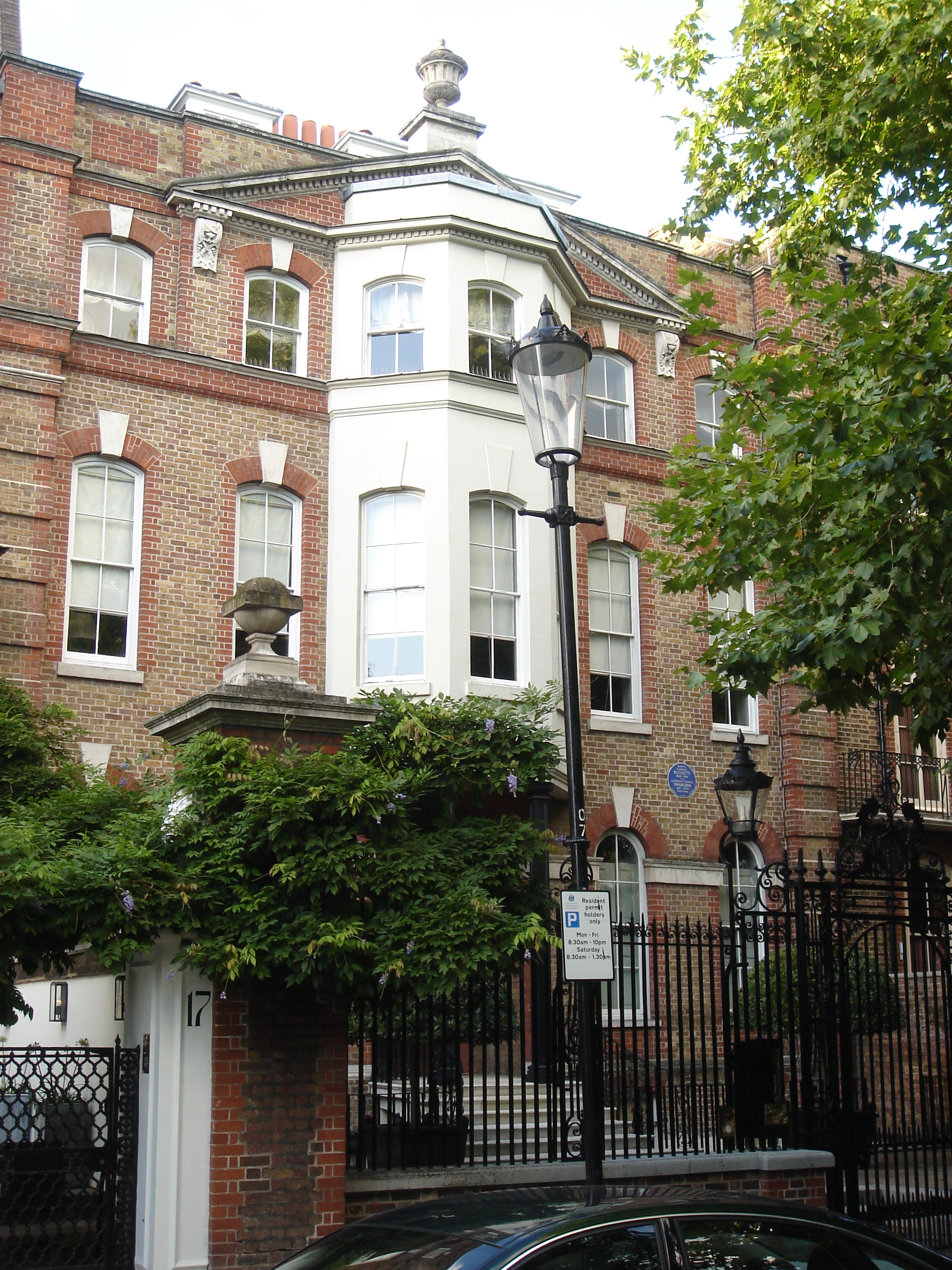
16 Cheyne Walk, home to Dante Gabriel Rossetti

No. 1:

- Samuel Prout Newcombe (b. 1824) entrepreneur, leased the property from the ground landlord, the Earl Cadogan, in 1891 shortly after it had been rebuilt. Newcombe had made his money in the 1850s from 'The London School of Photography', a photographic portrait studio that soon had branches across London and beyond, exploiting the public's appetite for carte de visite portraits. His daughter Bertha Newcombe (1857–1947), who lived in the house until her father's death in 1912, was an artist, illustrator and suffragist. She had a relationship with George Bernard Shaw, who sat for a portrait in her studio within the house.

No.2:

- John Barrymore American actor, lived for a short time at No.2, on the corner with Flood Street.
- Vera Brittain, novelist and pacifist, and her husband, George Catlin, lived at number 2 before and during the Second World War.

No.3:

- Admiral William Henry Smyth, and later Keith Richards, lived at number 3, which in 1945 became a National Trust property housing the Benton Fletcher collection of keyboard instruments.

No.4:

- George Eliot spent the last three weeks of her life at number 4.
- William Sandys Wright Vaux, antiquarian.
- William Dyce, Scottish painter and arts tutor.
- Daniel Maclise, painter.
- Michael Bloomberg, the former mayor of New York City, acquired number 4 in 2015.

No.5:

- The miser John Camden Neild lived at number 5.
- Howard Frank, English estate agent and co-founder of the Knight Frank estate agent chain.

No.6:

- Sir Arthur Sullivan, English composer, attended boarding school at number 6 in 1854.
- Edward Dundas Butler, translator and senior librarian at the Department of Printed Books, British Museum.
- Archibald Sinclair, 1st Viscount Thurso, British Liberal politician, Secretary of State for War during World War II.
- Gerald Scarfe now lives there.
- The house has a plaque to commemorate Margaret Damer Dawson, who was an early head of the women's police service.

No.10:

- David Lloyd George lived at number 10.

No.11:

- Sir George Scott Robertson, Colonial Administrator and traveller in Afghanistan, lived at number 11, as did Sir Colin Scott-Moncrieff, British civil engineer, most notably in colonial Egypt.

No. 12:

- Sir John Scott Lillie, JP, decorated Peninsular War veteran, Deputy Lieutenant of Middlesex, inventor and political activist lived at no. 12 (previously, no. 13) Cheyne Walk and added a floor to it. The building was demolished in 1887, but elements from it were later used in the reconstruction of 1 Cheyne Walk.

No.13:

- Ralph Vaughan Williams lived at number 13 from 1905 to 1928. There, he wrote works including his first three symphonies, the Fantasia on a Theme by Thomas Tallis, The Lark Ascending, and Hugh the Drover.

No.14:

- Bertrand Russell lived at number 14 in 1902.

No.15:

- The landscape painter Cecil Gordon Lawson lived at number 15 (a number of his works still hang there).
- The engraver Henry Thomas Ryall lived at number 15.
- 18th-century Admiral Sir John Balchen lived at number 15.
- The Allason family, well known for their political and literary influence, lived at number 15.
- The Baron and Baroness Courtney of Penwith lived at number 15.
- Hester Dowden, English spiritualist, lived at number 15.

No.16:

- Dante Gabriel Rossetti lived at number 16 (where he was banned from keeping peacocks due to the noise) from 1862 to 1882.
- Hall Caine, novelist, as Rossetti's housemate.
- Frederick Sandys, painter, as Rossetti's housemate 1866–67.
- Algernon Charles Swinburne.
- Florence Kate Upton, English illustrator, creator of the Golliwog character.
- John Paul Getty II lived here from the late 1970s to the early 1990s.
- Jacques Blumenthal, German pianist and composer.

No.17:

- Thomas Attwood (composer) (1765–1838) lived at number 17 for some years up to his death in 1838. He was organist at St Paul's Cathedral from 1796, and of the Chapel Royal from 1836. He was a pupil of Mozart. Thomas Attwood is buried in the crypt of St Paul's underneath the organ.

No.18:

- Number 18 was renowned for being the home of the curious museum (knackatory) and tavern known as Don Saltero's Coffee House. The proprietor was James Salter, who was for many years the servant of Sir Hans Sloane.

No.19:

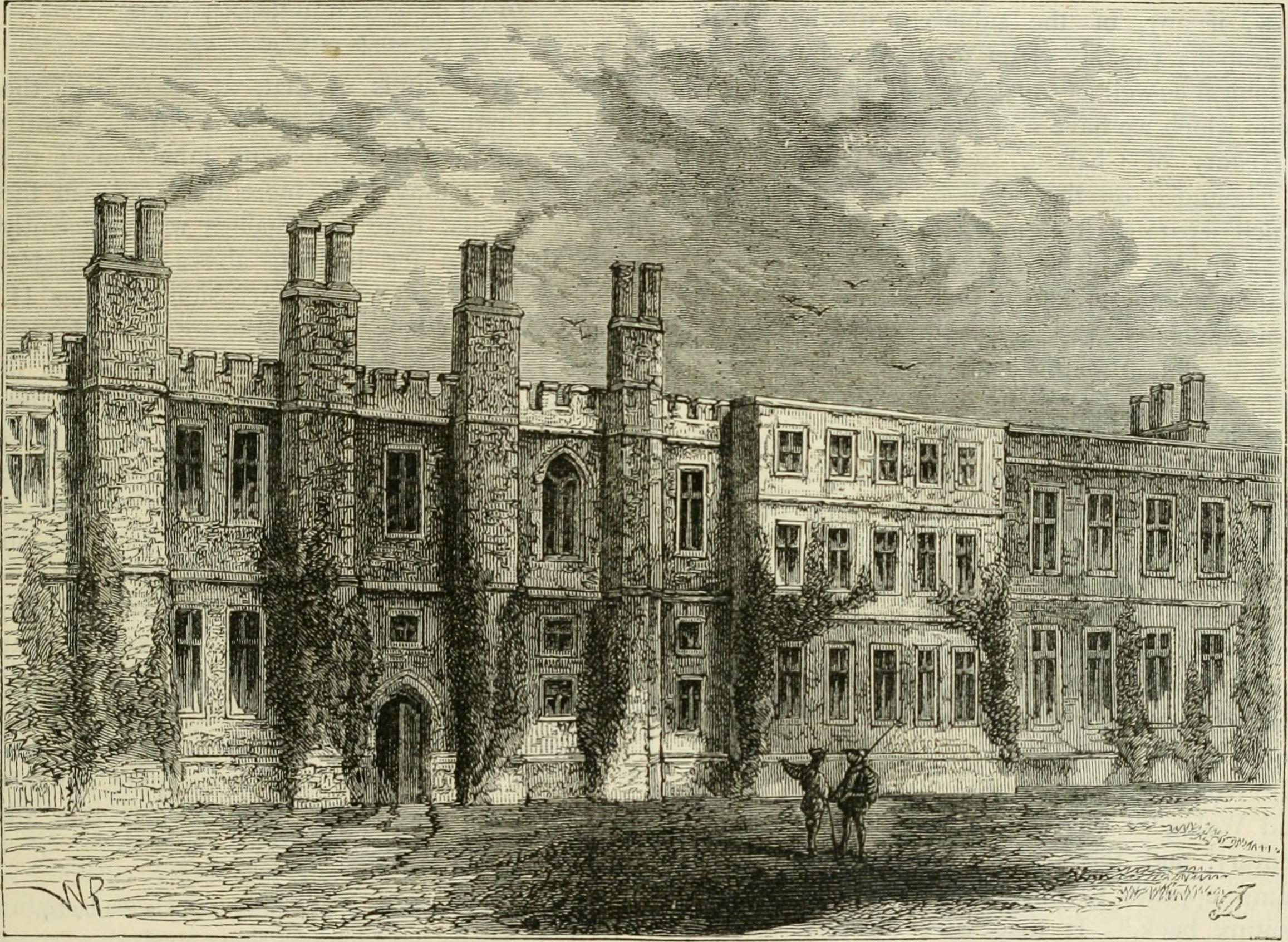
The Tudor House of the old Chelsea Manor

- No 19 was site of the horrific 1973 killing of elderly widow Isabella Griffith, by the serial killer Patrick Mackay.
- Sir Hans Sloane's manor house, demolished in 1760, stood at numbers 19–26.

No.21:

- James McNeill Whistler lived at numbers 21 (1890–92), 72 (? to his death there in 1903), 96 (1866–1878) and 101 (1863) at different times.
- Mortimer Menpes, the watercolourist and etcher, shared a flat with Whistler.
- Edward Arthur Walton lived here.

No.22:

- Dame Elizabeth Taylor, English actress, rented this house during the 1982 West End run of her Broadway play, The Little Foxes.

No.23:

- Sol Campbell, footballer.

No.24:

- Amanda Eliasch, photographer and documentary filmmaker

No.25

- Lord Browne, former CEO of BP.

No.27:

- Bram Stoker, Irish theatre manager and novelist, author of Dracula, lived at No.27.

No.37:

- Nicolaus Ludwig, Imperial Count von Zinzendorf und Pottendorf, and the Brethren of the Moravian Church renovated Lindsey House at numbers 99–100 in Cheyne Walk in the mid-18th century; it was for a number of years the headquarters of their worldwide missionary activity. Moravian Close nearby is still the London God's Acre, where many famous Moravians are buried.

No.41:

- James Clerk Maxwell lived at number 41 while lecturing at King's College London in the early 1860s. He used the iron railings outside his home in two experiments on electro-magnetic fields, much to the dismay of friends and foreigners.

No.42, Shrewsbury House:

- Guy Liddell, British Intelligence officer, lived in a flat in the present Shrewsbury House, No.42 Cheyne Walk.
- James Grant, doctor, adventurer and shark attack survivor.

No.48:

- Mick Jagger and Marianne Faithfull lived at number 48 in 1968.

No. 74: 0815607318

- Architect C. R. Ashbee designed number 74 and lived there off and on until 1917. He also designed number 38, 39.

No.89:

- Charles Edward Mudie, English publisher and founder of Mudie's Lending Library, was born 1818 in Cheyne Walk, where his father owned a circulating library, stationery and bookbinding business at number 89.

No.91:

- Artist Charles Conder lived at 91 Cheyne Walk, 1904–1906

No.92 (Belle Vue):

- The chemist Charles Hatchett, the poet William Bell Scott, and the anatomist John Marshall lived at Belle Vue House, number 92.
- Novelist Ken Follett and his wife, the politician Barbara Follett, lived here.
- Patrick Wall, Conservative MP, lived here.

No.93:

- Elizabeth Gaskell was born at number 93.

No.95:

- Anna Lea Merritt, after the death of her husband, Henry Merritt in 1877, Anna moved to No.95 where she set up her art studio, the earliest known date of her being registered at this address was in January 1879.

No. 96–101 (Lindsey House, presently known as No. 100)

- Diana Mitford lived at number 96 with her first husband Bryan Guinness in 1932.
- Sir Marc Brunel, who designed the Thames Tunnel, lived at number 98.
- His son Isambard Kingdom Brunel also lived there.
- Hugh Lane, art dealer, collector and founder of the Municipal Gallery of Modern Art lived at number 100 (Lindsey House) from 1909 until his death on the RMS Lusitania in 1915.

No.104:

- Hilaire Belloc lived at number 104, as did the artist Walter Greaves.

No. 107

- Sir Walter Westley Russell, English painter and arts tutor

No. 108

- John Tweed, sculptor and friend of Auguste Rodin, lived at number 108.

No. 109:

- Sir Philip Steer lived at number 109.

No. 113

- Suffragette Isabella Potbury and her husband, the playwright and actor Charles Nicholas Spencer.

No.116:

- Hope Emily Allen, American medieval history scholar, in particular, of the medieval mystic Richard Rolle.

No.119:

- J. M. W. Turner died at number 119 in 1851.
- Rolling Stones musician Ronnie Wood also lived here.

No.120:

- Sylvia Pankhurst lived at number 120 after leaving university.

No.122:

- Peter Warlock, English composer, lived at number 122 in 1921.
- George Melly, jazz musician, lived in a flat sublet by Whidborne.
- Bridget Keir, English landscape painter.
- Gabriel Atkin (1897–1937), English landscape painter and architect, who was a lover of the poet Siegfried Sassoon, lived here.
- Also Timothy Whidborne, English portrait painter.
- Raymond McIntyre, New Zealand painter, lived at number 122 from 1911 to 1918.

- Carlyle Mansions
  - Richard Addinsell, English composer, lived in flat 1.
  - Gordon Harker, English actor, lived in flat 11.
  - Edward Robey, a lawyer in the Acid Bath Murders case of the serial killer John George Haigh, lived in flat 11.
  - T. S. Eliot, American poet and writer, lived in flat 19.
  - Shapur Kharegat, journalist, editor and former Asia Director of The Economist lived at flat 17.
  - John Davy Hayward, theatre and literary critic, lived in flat 19.
  - Henry James spent his last years and died here in flat 21.
  - Erskine Childers lived in flat 20, with his family, and wrote his novel The Riddle of the Sands there as well. He also lived at 16 Cheyne Gardens for several years.
  - Ian Fleming, novelist, Intelligence officer, creator of spy James Bond, lived in flat 24. He also lived briefly at number 122 Cheyne Walk
  - W. Somerset Maugham, British novelist, lived in flat 27.
  - Lionel Davidson lived at Carlyle Mansions from 1976 to 1984, where he wrote The Chelsea Murders, a CWA Gold Dagger winner.
  - Sol Campbell has a six-storey, five bedroom house in Cheyne Walk, and an apartment in Carlyle Mansions.

- Edith Cheesman, watercolour artist, lived at number 127 in 1911, since demolished and now covered by the World's End Estate, where The Clash frontman Joe Strummer lived.
- George Weidenfeld, publisher, who became Lord Weidenfeld of Chelsea, lived here from the 1960s until his death on 20 January 2016.
- George Best once had a flat here.
- Laurence Olivier and Jill Esmond lived here in the 1930s.
- Mary Sidney lived at Crosby Hall from 1609 to 1615.
- In July 1972, during a short-lived ceasefire, an IRA delegation that included Gerry Adams and Martin McGuinness held talks in a house in Cheyne Walk with a British government team led by Northern Ireland Secretary William Whitelaw.
- The Old Cheyneans – former pupils of Sloane Grammar School, Hortensia Road, Chelsea – take their name from the association with Cheyne Walk and Sir Hans Sloane who lived there.
- Colin Colahan, Australian painter and sculptor, lived in Cheyne Walk.
- Augustus Pugin, English architect, known for his work on the Palace of Westminster, lived briefly on Cheyne Walk in 1841.
- Susan Fleetwood, British actress, lived on Cheyne Walk. Her brother is Mick Fleetwood, a member of the British-American rock group Fleetwood Mac.

== Fictional residents ==
- Sâr Dubnotal (1909–1910) owned a house in Cheyne Walk.
- Thomas Carnacki (1910–1912), a fictional occult detective created by English fantasy writer William Hope Hodgson, lived in a flat at 472 Cheyne Walk.
- Katharine Hilbery, the protagonist of Virginia Woolf's second novel, Night and Day (1919), lives on Cheyne Walk with her parents.
- In Nancy Mitford's novel The Pursuit of Love, (1945) the heroine Linda Radlett lives in a house on Cheyne Walk before and during the Second World War.
- The climax of The French Lieutenant's Woman (1969) by John Fowles is set at number 16, in the Rossetti household.
- In Iris Murdoch's A Word Child (1975), Gunnar Jopling and his second wife, Lady Kitty, lived here.
- In Roald Dahl's My Uncle Oswald (1979), the protagonist lives with his parents in Cheyne Walk at the start of the story.
- In Jeffrey Archer's 1984 British political novel First Among Equals, the MP Andrew Fraser lived in Cheyne Walk.
- Margaret Prior, the protagonist of Sarah Waters' Affinity (1999), lives on Cheyne Walk.
- Richard Bolitho's mistress Lady Catherine Somervell kept a house on Cheyne Walk as mentioned in Alexander Kent's novel, The Darkening Sea (1993).
- In Timothy Findley's Pilgrim (2000), the eponymous main character is a former resident of Cheyne Walk.
- In Stormbreaker (2000), Alex Rider directs his cab to his home in Cheyne Walk, London.
- In Daniel Silva's The Defector (2009), the Russian billionaire Viktor Orlov lives at number 43.
- In Cassandra Clare's The Infernal Devices series, werewolf Woolsey Scott lives at No. 16.
- In Elizabeth George's Inspector Lynley series, Simon and Deborah St James live and work on Cheyne Walk.
- Sean Dillon, a recurring character from author Jack Higgins, has a home in Cheyne Walk.
- Lady Celia Lytton and members of her family live in a house on Cheyne Walk for more than half a century in Penny Vincenzi's trilogy, The Spoils of Time.
- In Lisa Jewell's The Family Upstairs, the plot centres around a baby found alongside three dead bodies in 16 Cheyne Walk, and the mystery of what happened to the other inhabitants of the house.
- Penelope Widmore's street address on the television show Lost, in the year 1996, was 423 Cheyne Walk.
- The main characters of Mariana Enríquez's novel Our share of night, Juan and Rosario, live for a while on Cheyne Walk (number unspecified), while Juan's physician and bodyguards live at number 4.

== See also ==
- 4 Cheyne Walk
- 6 Cheyne Walk
- List of eponymous roads in London

== References and sources ==
Sources

- Stourton, James (2012). Great Houses of London (Hardback). London: Frances Lincoln. ISBN 978-0-7112-3366-9.
