= Neild =

Neild is a surname. Notable people with the surname include:

- Chris Neild (born 1987), American football player
- Edward F. Neild (1884–1955), American architect
- James Neild (1744–1814), English jeweller and prison reformer, father of John Camden Neild
- James Edward Neild (1824–1906), Australian doctor and theatre critic
- John Neild (1846–1911), English-born Australian politician
- John Camden Neild (1780–1852), English miser, son of James Neild
- Robert Neild (1924–2018), British economist

== See also ==
- Nield
