= Neeld =

Neeld is an English surname. It has been described as a variant or modified form of the surname Nield. Notable people with the surname include:

- Alice Teague-Neeld (born 1996), Australian netball player
- Greg Neeld (born 1955), Canadian ice hockey player
- John Neeld (1805–1891), British politician
- Joseph Neeld (1789–1856), British politician
- Mark Neeld (born 1971), Australian rules footballer

== See also ==
- Neeld baronets
- Neeld station
