= 5 Cheyne Walk =

House in Chelsea, London, England

Coordinates: 51°29′03″N 0°09′52″W

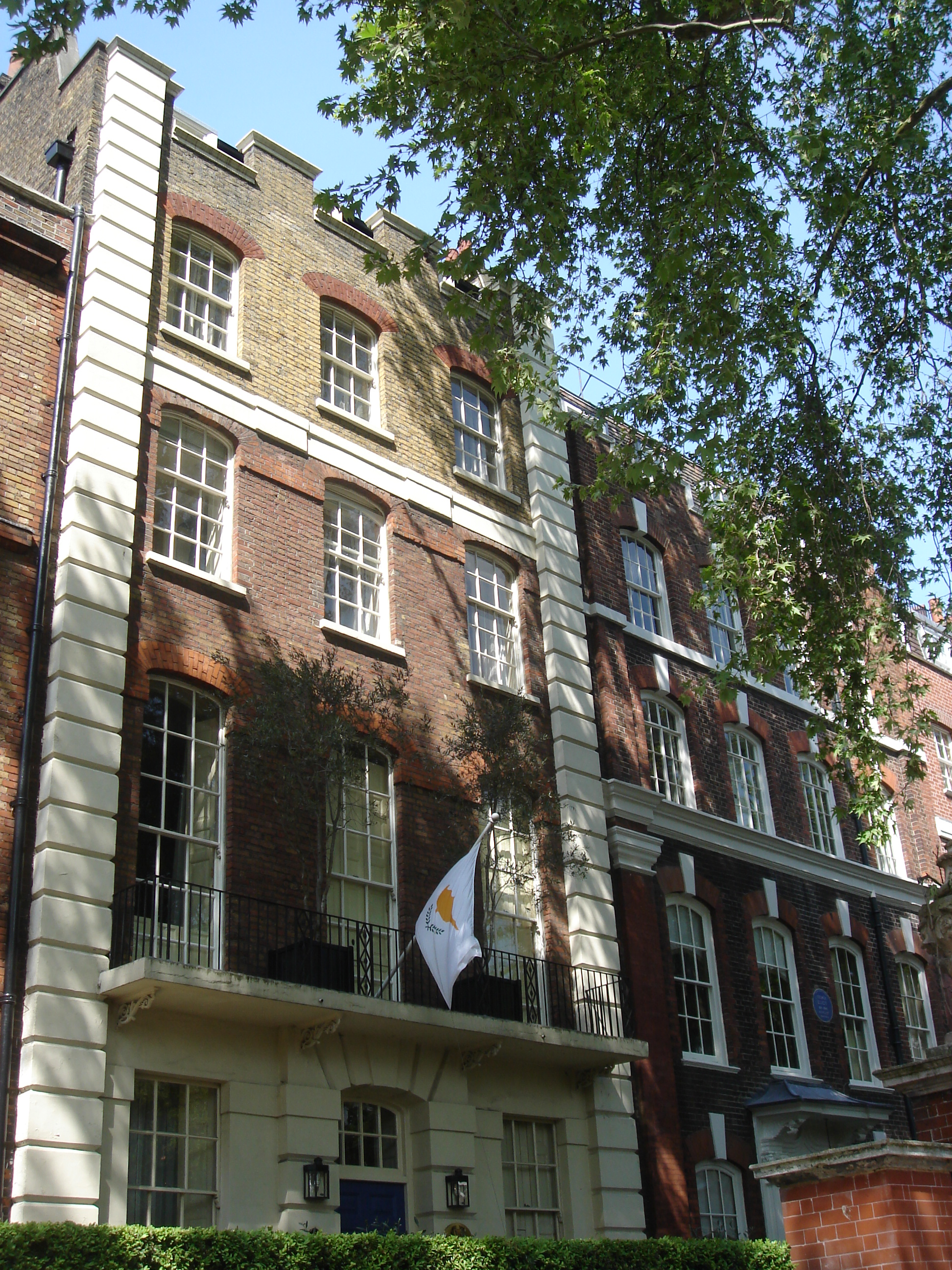
5 Cheyne Walk

5 Cheyne Walk is a Grade II* listed house on Cheyne Walk, Chelsea, London, built in 1718.

The miser John Camden Neild lived there from 1814 until his death in 1852.

In the 20th Century it was the home of Howard Frank, the co-founder of Knight-Frank estate agency.

5 Cheyne Walk is now the residence of the Cypriot High Commissioner (The country's ambassador to the UK).

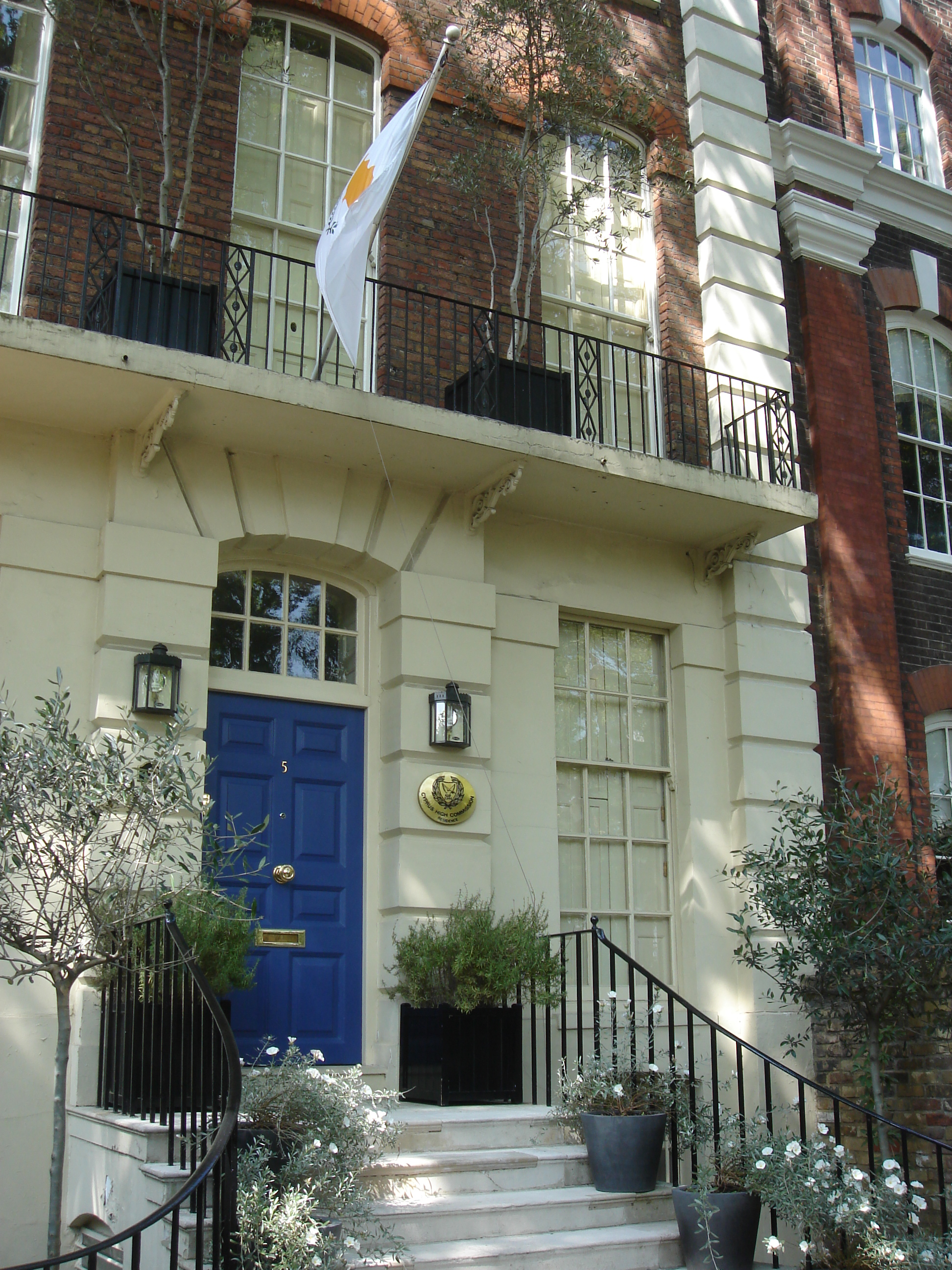
5 Cheyne Walk

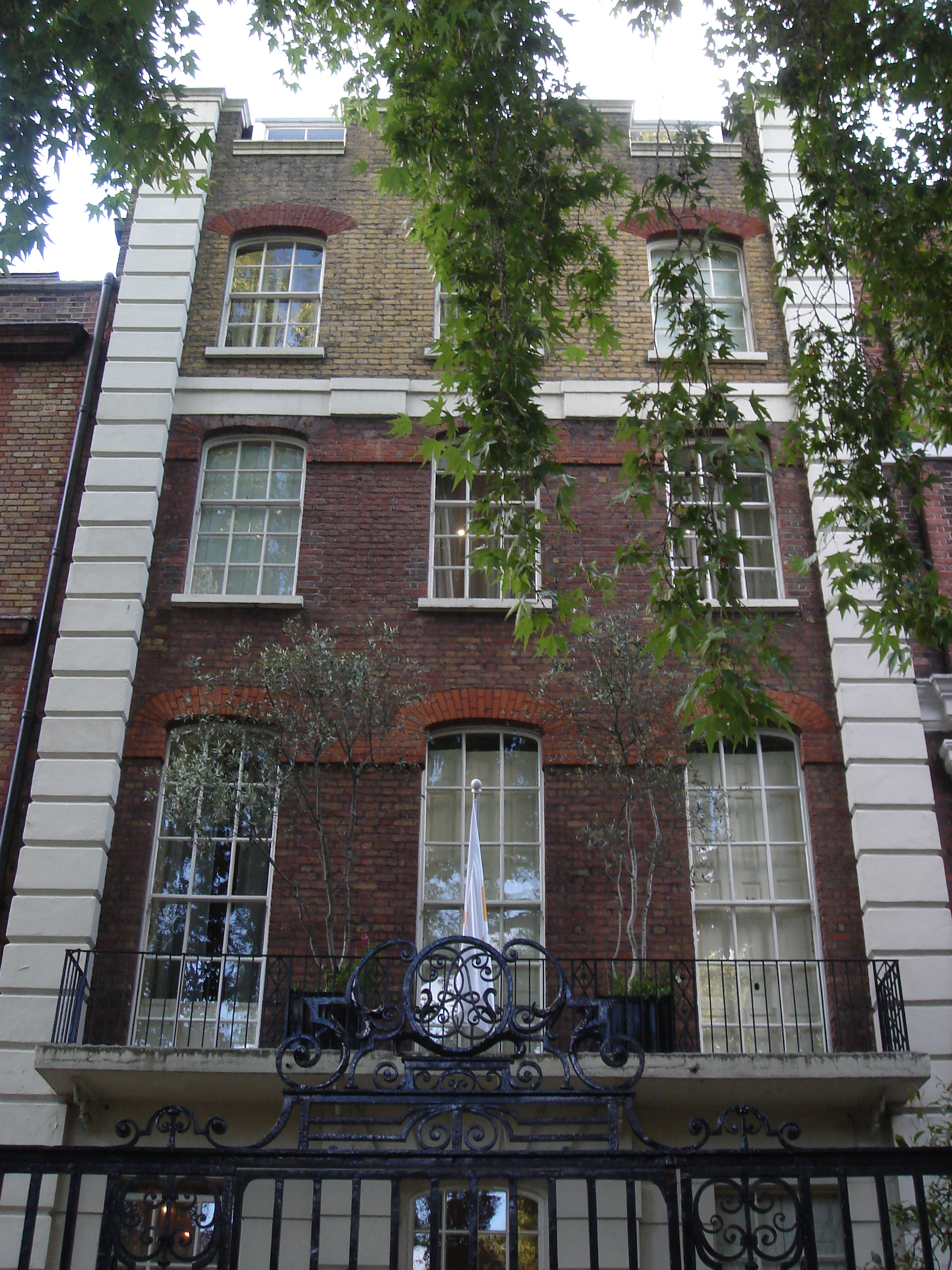
5 Cheyne Walk

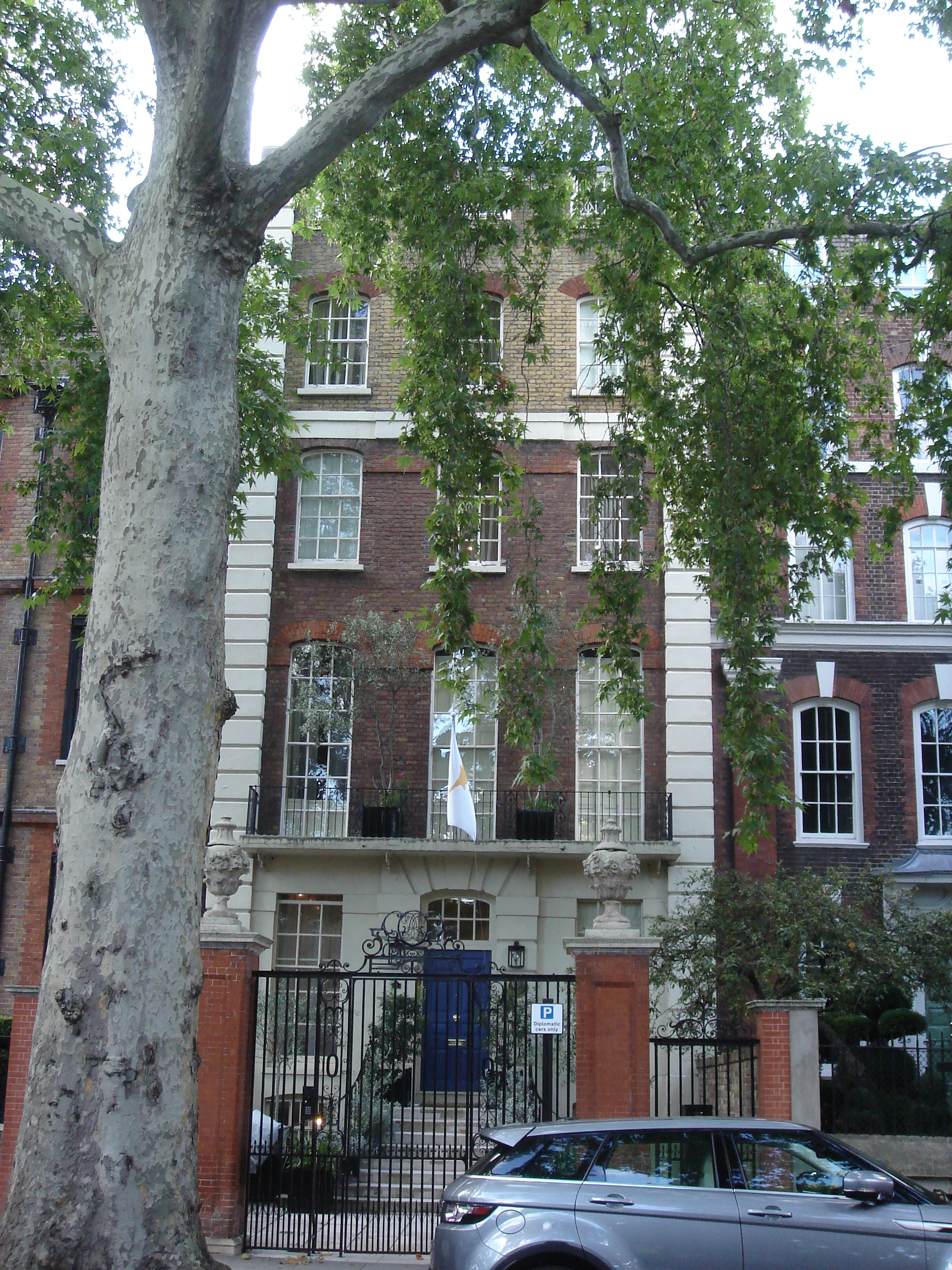
5 Cheyne Walk
