= Anne Manning =

Anne Manning may refer to:

- Anne Manning (novelist) (1807–1879), British novelist
- Anne Manning (racewalker) (born 1959), retired racewalker from Australia
