= Nields =

Nields may refer to:

- Nields (surname)
- The Nields, musical group including Katryna Nields and Nerissa Nields
- USS Nields (DD-616), Benson-class destroyer in the United States Navy during World War II

== See also ==
- Nield
- Niels
