= Howard Frank =

English estate agent and public servant

Sir Howard Frank Bt GBE KCB
- Portrait by Walter Stoneman, 1917

Director-General of Lands to the War Office, Air Ministry and Ministry of Munitions
- In office 1917–1922

Personal details
- Born: Howard George Frank; 10 November 1871 Blackhurst Park, Pembury, Kent, England
- Died: 10 January 1932 (aged 60) Cheyne Walk, London, England
- Occupation: Estate agent

Sir Howard George Frank, 1st Baronet (10 November 1871 – 10 January 1932) was an English estate agent and public servant. He was a co-founder of Knight Frank.

Frank was born at Blackhurst Park, Pembury, Tunbridge Wells, Kent, the son of Frederick Frank. He was educated at Marlborough College and then entered the estate agency profession, in which he remained all his life, eventually becoming recognised as the "head" of the profession in Britain. He was head of the firms of Knight, Frank & Rutley of London and Walton & Lee of Edinburgh and was president of the Estate Agents' Institute from 1910 to 1912.

In 1916, he was appointed honorary adviser to the Ministry of Munitions on land valuation. The following year he became Director-General of Lands to the War Office and Air Ministry as well as the Ministry of Munitions, holding the post until 1922. After the First World War he also served as deputy chairman and then chairman of the Disposals Board (later Disposal and Liquidation Commission), which was charged with disposing of surplus war materiel. He served on a number of public committees and Royal Commissions in the 1920s and 1930s. Frank was a member of the committee that built and opened London's first public golf courses in Richmond Park, which were opened in 1923 and 1925.

Frank was knighted in 1914, appointed Knight Commander of the Order of the Bath (KCB) in the 1918 Birthday Honours, and created a baronet in the 1920 Birthday Honours for his wartime services. He was appointed Knight Grand Cross of the Order of the British Empire (GBE) in the 1924 Birthday Honours, for public service.

He died suddenly of a heart attack after dinner at his home at 5 Cheyne Walk, London. He was succeeded in the baronetcy by his eight-year-old son Howard.

== Personal life ==
Frank was married twice. By his first marriage he had a daughter, Mary.

In January 1922, at the age of 50, he married his 19-year-old former secretary Nancy Muriel (Nan) Brooks, who was five years younger than his daughter. The couple had two children: Howard Frederick (born 5 April 1923) and Robert John (born 16 March 1925). Lieutenant Sir Howard Frank was killed in action while serving as a tank commander with the Grenadier Guards on 10 September 1944, at the age of 21. He was succeeded to the title by his younger brother, Robert (born 16 March 1925).

Throughout the 1920s, Frank owned several yachts in which the couple regularly sailed off the coast of southern England. It was through sailing that the couple was introduced at Cowes to Squadron Leader (later Air Marshal Sir) Arthur Coningham, who would sail with them as a member of the crew. Beginning sometime in 1930, Nan and Coningham began an affair. In July 1931, Coningham was advised that he would be posted overseas in February 1932.

In response to this potential separation they delayed making a decision on what to do due to their regard for her husband and the fear of a scandal. Their dilemma was solved by Frank's sudden unexpected death. Later that year, the lovers married on 11 July 1932 in the station church at Aboukir, Alexandria.

== Footnotes ==
Baronetage of the United Kingdom
New title	Baronet (of Withyham); 1920–1932	Succeeded by Howard Frederick Frank
