= Carlyle Mansions =

Block of flats in London, England

Coordinates: 51.4834°N 0.1698°W

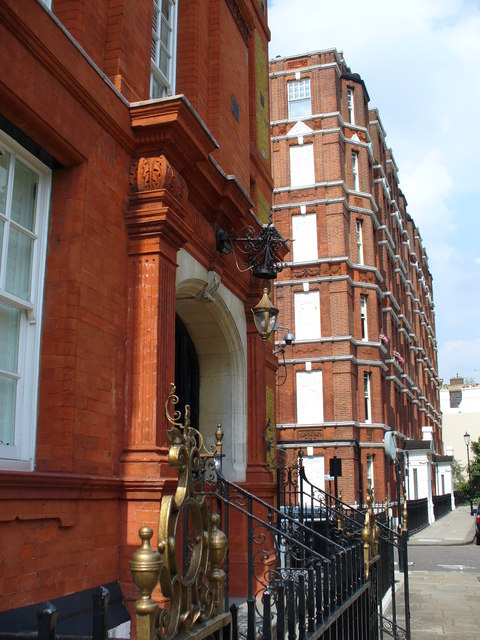
Carlyle Mansions (right)

Carlyle Mansions is a block of flats located on Cheyne Walk, in the Chelsea area of London, England. Built in 1886, it was named after Thomas Carlyle, himself a resident of Chelsea for much of his life.

Carlyle Mansions is nicknamed the "Writers’ Block", as it has been home to Henry James, Erskine Childers, T. S. Eliot, Somerset Maugham, Ian Fleming and other noted authors.

== Notable residents ==
- No. 1: Richard Addinsell, English composer
- No. 6: Thomas Hare, English political reformer
- No. 11: Gordon Harker, English actor
  - also Edward Robey, lawyer in the Acid Bath Murders case of the serial killer John George Haigh
- No. 12a: Melton Prior, English illustrator and war correspondent
- No. 19: T. S. Eliot, American-British poet and writer
  - also the literary critic John Davy Hayward
- No. 20: Robert Erskine Childers, Irish nationalist and novelist, author of The Riddle of the Sands
- No. 21: Henry James, American novelist
- No. 24: Ian Fleming, novelist, creator of James Bond
  - also Sol Campbell, England and Arsenal football player
- No. 27: W. Somerset Maugham, British novelist
- Lionel Davidson, British novelist
