= Shapur Kharegat =

Indian journalist (1932–2000)

- Born: 1 November 1932; Bombay, British India
- Died: 29 September 2000 (aged 67); London, United Kingdom
- Education: Malvern College, Jesus College, Cambridge, the University of Toronto
- Occupations: Journalist, Editor and Asia Director of The Economist
- Title: Asia Director

Shapur Sorab Kharegat (1 November 1932 – 29 September 2000) was a Parsi journalist, editor and former Asia Director of The Economist magazine.

Kharegat was born in Bombay, at "Palm Land", the home of his maternal great-grandfather, the ship chandler magnate Kavasjee Dadabhoy Dubash (+31.10.1921), to Col. Dr. Sorabjee Merwanjee Kharegat *1900 +19.10.1963 (son of Col. Dr. Mervanji Pestanji Kharegat of Madras Medical Service *20.11.1855 +17.12.1932), and his wife Dinbai Mehta (daughter of Navazbai Dubash and Byramji Mehta). He spent his childhood at "The Clif" on Carmichael Road, Bombay at "Babington House" in Mahabaleshwar and at 17 Carlyle Mansions, Chelsea, London. Kharegat, who had a younger sister, Ratanbai (*15.1.1941 +11.8.2003), was a Parsi and a descendant of Sir Jamsetjee Jeejebhoy, the first Indian Baronet and a first cousin once removed of Russi Mody, chairman and managing director of Tata Steel.

His maternal step-cousin was the World War II hero Lt. George Clement, né Spiridonoff, (20 November 1917 – 7 September 1944). His first cousin was the late wife of Rustom K. S. Ghandhi.

His paternal family was responsible for the building of "Kharegat Colony", a charitable housing estate scheme in India. Sam Manekshaw, a family friend and his father served together during World War II in Indo China. Kharegat was a member of the Travellers Club.

As one of the last great old colonial characters, he was Asia director of The Economist, based in Hong Kong from August 1966 until his retirement in 1993, and died in London.

He was a major catalyst for The Economist's inclusion in Asia and according to The Economist's publisher David Hanger, S.S. Kharegat is remembered as "a huge character who travelled the world in his own inimitable style. He argued the case for the business side to enter Asia long before many of us realised its potential, and made all of the early running to develop the region ahead of many of our rivals."
