= Frank baronets =

Baronetcy in the Baronetage of the United Kingdom

The Frank Baronetcy, of Withyham in the County of Sussex, is a title in the Baronetage of the United Kingdom. It was created on 19 June 1920 for the estate agent and public servant Howard Frank. He was a senior partner in the firm of Knight, Frank and Rutland, and served as Director-General of Lands to the War Office, Air Ministry and Ministry of Munitions from 1917 to 1922.

== Frank baronets, of Withyham (1920) ==
- Sir Howard George Frank, 1st Baronet (1871–1932)
- Sir Howard Frederick Frank, 2nd Baronet (1923–1944)
- Sir Robert John Frank, 3rd Baronet (1925–1987)
- Sir Robert Andrew Frank, 4th Baronet (born 1964)

There is no heir to the baronetcy.
