= Bridget Keir =

British watercolour painter (1873–1954)

Bridget Mary Keir (13 June 1873 – 26 October 1954) (Note: Keir's date of birth is recorded as 13 June 1873 in the Bengal Military Orphan Society pension register and in the 1939 Register; the 1881, 1901 and 1921 censuses of England and Wales record ages consistent with a 1873 birth. Buckman (1998) gives 1883, in error.) was a British watercolour painter.

In 1922 she exhibited at Walker's Galleries, London, in the exhibition The Sands and Waters of Egypt. McEwan's Dictionary of Scottish Art and Architecture records her exhibiting eighteen times at the Royal Glasgow Institute of the Fine Arts and once at the Aberdeen Artists Society between 1929 and 1951, and her residence at 122 Cheyne Walk, Chelsea.

== Public collections ==
- Victoria and Albert Museum, London: A Felucca on the Nile, loading cotton (ca. 1922), accession SD.546.
