= James Neild =

English jeweller and prison reformer (1744 – 1814)

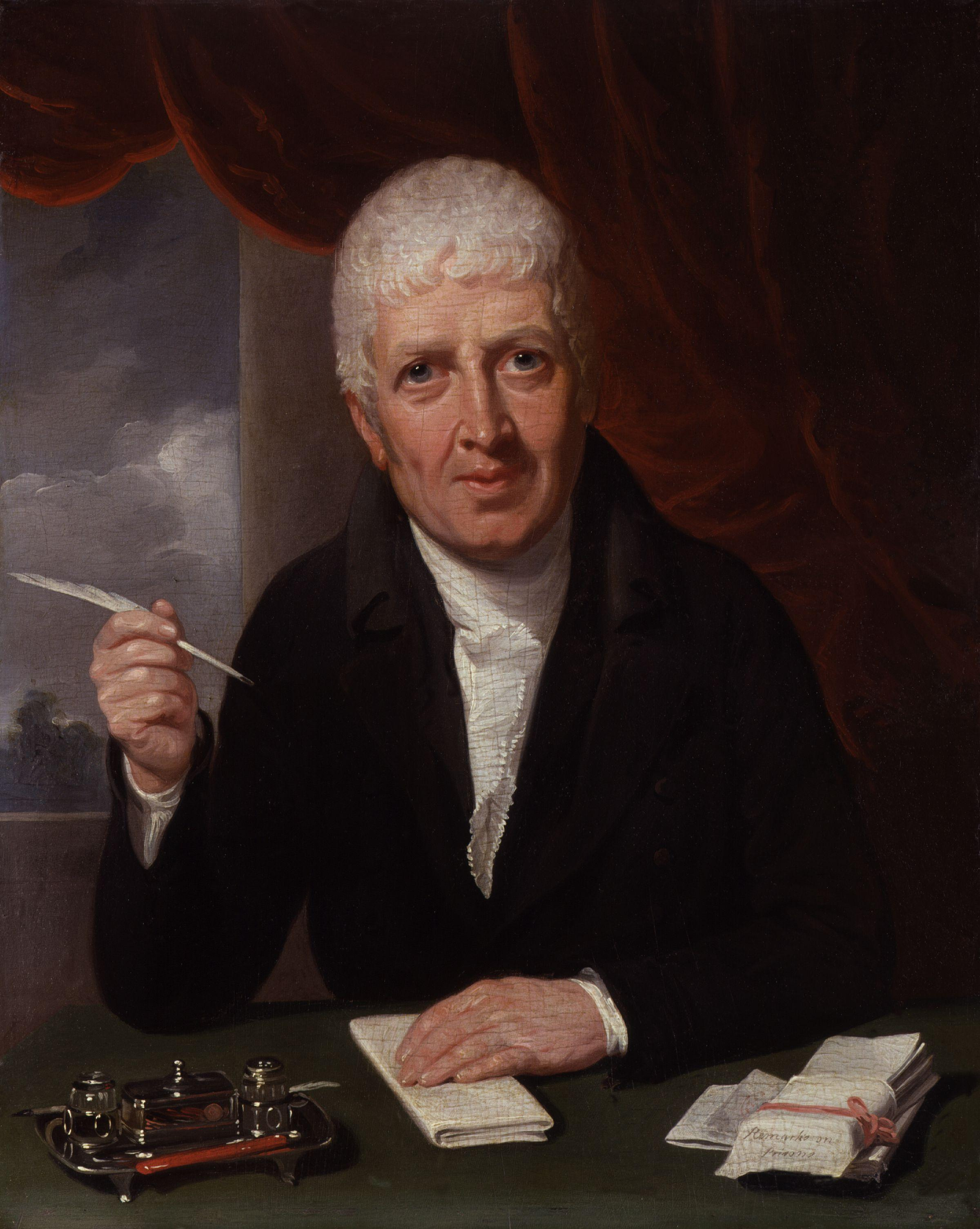
James Neild by Samuel De Wilde

James Neild (4 June 1744 – 16 February 1814) was an English jeweller and prison reformer. While he was supported by two particular friends, Weeden Butler and John Coakley Lettsom, his efforts were distinct from those of John Howard, and the Quaker group including Elizabeth Fry.

== Early life ==
Neild was born in Knutsford, Cheshire, where his family owned property. After his father died, which left five children, including James, and Neild's mother to be supported by carrying on business as a linendraper. After a brief education, Neild lived two years with an of his uncle, who was a farmer; then at the end of 1760, Neild obtained a situation with a jeweller in London, and was later employed by Thomas Heming, the king's goldsmith.

In 1770, a legacy from his farmer uncle enabled Neild to set up in business as a jeweller in London's St James's Street. The venture proved a success, and in 1792 he retired on a fortune.

Neild moved to Chelsea, London, and concentrated on philanthropy and campaigning; he worked especially in the field of prison reform.

== Penal reformer ==
In his early London days, when visiting in 1762 a fellow-apprentice who was confined for debt in the King's Bench Prison, Neild felt the necessity of reforms. Subsequently he inspected Newgate, the Derby prisons, Liverpool, Bridewell, the Chester dungeons, and before 1770 a number of prisons in northern France. The harsh treatment to which prisoners were subjected almost everywhere stirred him into activism.

A sermon by Weeden Butler in February 1772 caused Neild to raise funds to secure the release of debtors. On the formation in May 1773 of a Society for the Relief and Discharge of Persons imprisoned for Small Debts, Neild was appointed treasurer, and remained associated with the society for the rest of his life. In his capacity of treasurer he visited prisons in and about London, and made weekly reports. Fifteen months after the formation of the society 986 prisoners had been discharged, at a cost of a little less than £2,900.

In 1779 Neild extended his inspection to Flanders and Germany. In 1781 he caught gaol fever at Warwick, and his ill-health, combined with business interests, for a time interrupted his philanthropic work.

== Later life ==
Neild was High Sheriff of Buckinghamshire in 1804, and a magistrate in several areas. In the latter half of 1809, during a four months' excursion in England and Scotland, he was presented with the freedom of Glasgow, Perth, Paisley, Inverness, and Ayr. He lived at 4 Cheyne Walk, Chelsea, where he died on 16 February 1814.

== Works ==
In 1800 Neild published his Account of Persons confined for Debt in the various Prisons of England and Wales ... with their Provisionary Allowances during Confinement, as reported to the Society for the Discharge and Relief of Small Debtors. In the third edition, published in 1808, the results of further investigations in Scotland, as well as in England, were incorporated.

Neild kept a diary of his prison tours, and wrote to his friend, Dr. John Coakley Lettsom, accounts of his experiences. Lettsom persuaded Neild to publish in the Gentleman's Magazine his "Prison Remarks"; they were prefaced by Lettsom, and led to an awakening of public interest. They could also make the prison authorities defensive, as the prison visitor Sarah Martin found in Great Yarmouth, some seven years after Neild made a damaging report in 1812.

In 1812, after inspecting a number of prisons, Neild published State of Prisons in England, Scotland and Wales. Along with Jeremy Bentham's Punishments and Rewards (1811), Neild's book helped to trigger parliamentary pressure for reform.

== Family ==
Neild married, in 1778, the eldest daughter of John Camden of Battersea. They had two sons and a daughter. On his death he was succeeded by his younger son John Camden Neild, the recluse and miser. His elder son William was disinherited and went abroad, in circumstances that affected Neild's posthumous reputation.
