= Nield =

Nield is a surname. Notable people with the surname include:

- Basil Nield (1903–1996), British politician
- George C. Nield, US government regulator, Office of Commercial Space
- Herbert Nield (1862–1932), British politician
- Lawrence Nield, Australian architect
- Wallace E. Nield (1889–1950), American politician

== See also ==
- Nields (disambiguation)
- Neild
