= Knight Frank =

Residential and commercial property consultancy

Knight Frank LLP
- Type: Private
- Industry: Estate agents
- Founded: 1896; 130 years ago as Knight, Frank & Rutley
- Founder: John Knight; Howard Frank; William Rutley
- Headquarters: 55 Baker Street, London, England
- Key people: William Beardmore-Gray (senior partner & chairman)
- Products: Residential and commercial property services
- Number of employees: +20,000 (2025)
- Website: www.knightfrank.com

Knight Frank LLP is a global real estate consultancy and estate agency headquartered in London, England.

Knight Frank has approximately 600 offices along with 20,000 people managing commercial, agricultural and residential real estate.

== History ==
The firm was founded in London by John Knight, Howard Frank and William Rutley in 1896. It arranged the sale of the Crystal Palace to Robert Windsor-Clive, 1st Earl of Plymouth for £210,000 in 1911.

Knight Frank managed the sale of the Duke of York's Headquarters in Chelsea, London, on behalf of the Ministry of Defence, for 2000. In February 2012, it acted as the estate agent when the Battersea Power Station development site was put up for sale.

The firm then participated in the founding of OnTheMarket in 2013. It won the instruction to sell 231 prime residential units within the Royal Atlantis on the Palm Jumeirah, Dubai, in 2015. Rennie Property joined Knight Frank’s global network in 2021.

The firm also managed the sale of Ayton Castle to comedian, Alan Carr, in February 2026.
