= Anne Manning (novelist) =

English novelist (1807–1879)

Anne Manning (17 February 1807 – 14 September 1879) was an English novelist. Born in London, she was a prolific writer, having 51 works to her credit. Though her writings are now antiquated in style, they were considered to have some literary charm and a delicate historical imagination. Her best-known novel features the young wife of the poet John Milton.

== Background and life ==
Manning initially produced two books of non-fiction, followed by her first fictional work, Village Belles (first published in 1833, though some modern sources mistakenly say 1838). Her best known works were initially printed as serials in Sharpe's Magazine and later published in book form. She is best known for The Maiden and Married Life of Mary Powell, afterwards Mistress Milton, which first appeared anonymously in 1849 and was later just referred to as Mary Powell. It is derived from the story of the young wife of John Milton. She is also known for The Household of Sir Thomas More, a picture of More's home life in the form of a diary written by his daughter Margaret.

Mary Powell was so popular that her subsequent works simply identified Manning as "The Author of Mary Powell," otherwise remaining anonymous. A number of sources subsequently attributed the pseudonym of "Mary Powell" to Hannah Mary Rathbone, whose The Diary of Lady Willoughby (1844) was similar in style to Manning, and erroneously suggested that Manning had at some point married and become Mrs. Rathbone. Manning and Rathbone both released a number of works which used Caslon Old Face font, to add a visual element to the notion that their works were actual diaries of long ago persons.

Manning never married, and was considered a chronic invalid, living for many years at Reigate Hill in Surrey until her mother died, and then at a sister's house near Tunbridge Wells, where she died in 1879.

Although inexpensive reprints of Mary Powell and The Household of Sir Thomas More were published into the 1930s, Manning's archaic style has long since fallen out of favour.

== Selected bibliography ==
Manning wrote over 50 books. They include:

- A Sister's Gift (1826, non-fiction)
- Stories from the History of Italy (1831, non-fiction)
- Village Belles (1833, first novel)
- The Maiden and Married Life of Mary Powell, afterwards Mistress Milton (1849)
- The Household of Sir Thomas More (1852)
- The Colloquies of Edward Osborne (1852) (regarding Edward Osborne)
- Cherry & Violet (1853)
- The Adventures of Caliph Haroun Alraschid (1855)
- The Old Chelsea Bun-House (1855) (in reference to the Chelsea Bun House)
- The Good Old Times (1857)
- Deborah's Diary (1858) (a sequel to Mary Powell, in the voice of Milton and Powell's daughter)
- The Ladies of Bever Hollow (1858)
- The Year Nine. A Tale of the Tyrol (1858)
- Poplar House Academy (1859)
- A Noble Purpose Nobly Won (1862)
- The Duchess of Trajetto (1863)
- Meadowleigh: A Tale of English Country Life (1863)
- An Interrupted Wedding (1864)
- The Lincolnshire Tragedy: Passages in the Life of the Faire Gospeller, Mistress Anne Askew (1866) (about Anne Askew)
- Jacques Bonneval, or the Days of the Dragonnades (1867)
