= Nields (surname) =

Nields is a surname. Notable people with the surname include:

- John Percy Nields, U.S. district judge in Delaware
- John W. Nields Jr., lawyer, and father of some members of The Nields
- Henry C. Nields, U.S. Navy officer, namesake of the USS Nields (DD-616)
- Sheryl Nields, American photographer

Fictional characters:

- Norman Nields, fictional character in The Junior Defenders
