= Edward Robey =

English barrister

Edward George Robey (1900 – 1983) born Edward George Wade, was an English barrister. He was best known for his role as the Chief Prosecutor in the John George Haigh case and for becoming a member of the British legal team at the Nuremberg war trials. He was appointed a Metropolitan Magistrate in 1954. He was the first child and only son of the music hall comedian George Robey.

== Life and career ==
Robey was born in St John's Wood, London and was the first of two children of the music hall comedian George Robey and his wife, the musical theatre actress Ethel née Haydon. From an early age, Edward showed some talent for the stage and appeared in a few minor roles as a child but gave up acting in his teenage years. He was educated at Westminster School, London and then Jesus College, Cambridge where he studied law. He furthered his studies under the barrister Edward Marshall Hall, who sponsored him when he came to the bar in 1925.

Robey changed his surname from Wade at the start of his professional career in honour of his father and continued to use it for the rest of his life. Robey's first major law assignment was as the Chief Prosecutor in the trial of John George Haigh, a serial killer who was subsequently hanged in 1949. Soon after, Robey became a member of the British legal team at the Nuremberg war trials and was later appointed a Metropolitan Magistrate in 1954.

== Bibliography ==
- Cotes, Peter (1972). George Robey: The Darling of the Halls. London: Cassell & Company Ltd. ISBN 978-0-304-93844-5.
- Wilson, Albert Edward (1956). Prime Minister of Mirth. The biography of Sir George Robey, C.B.E. With plates, including portraits. Michigan: Odham Press. OCLC 1731822.
