= John Camden Neild =

British miser

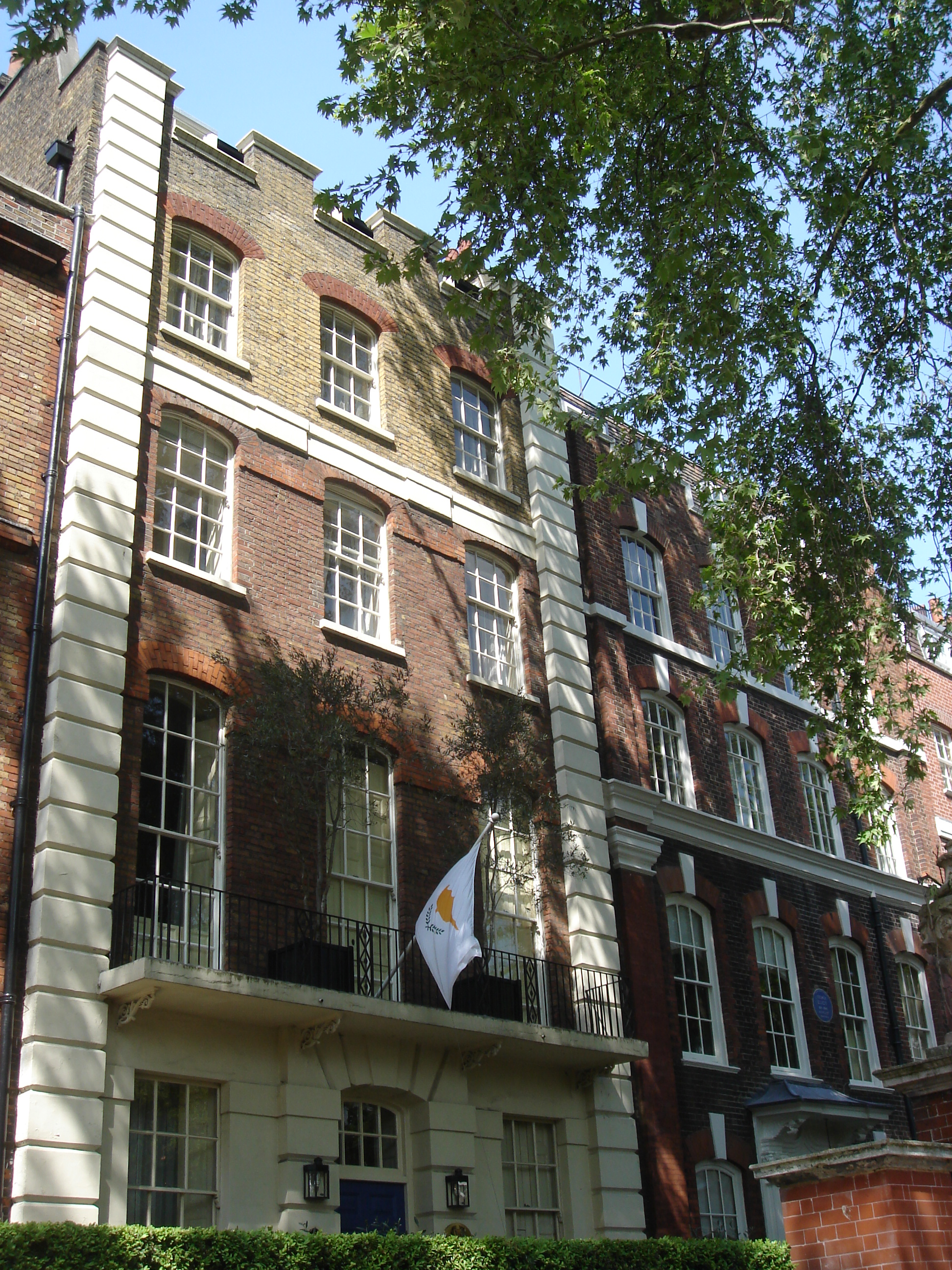
5 Cheyne Walk

John Camden Neild (1780–1852) was an English miser.

== Life ==
Neild, son of James Neild, prison reformer, was probably born in St. James's Street, London, about 1780. He was educated at Eton from 1793 to 1797, then at Trinity College, Cambridge, graduating in 1801, and being awarded his honorary M.A. three years later, as is standard at Cambridge. On 9 February 1808 he was called to the bar at Lincoln's Inn.

Succeeding in 1814 to the whole of his father's property, estimated at £250,000, he lived in a large house, 5 Cheyne Walk, Chelsea, and, while he was very wealthy at this time, he was so frugal with worldly pleasures that for a while he had not a bed to lie on. His dress consisted of a blue swallow-tailed coat with gilt buttons, brown trousers, short gaiters, and shoes which were patched and generally down at the heels. He never allowed his clothes to be brushed, because, he said, it destroyed the nap. He continually visited his numerous estates, walking whenever it was possible, never went to the expense of a great-coat, and always stayed with his tenants, sharing their coarse meals and lodging. While at North Marston, in Buckinghamshire, about 1828 he attempted to cut his throat, and his life was only saved by the prompt attention of his tenant's wife, Mrs. Neale. Unlike other eminent misers – Daniel Dancer or Hetty Green – he occasionally indulged in acts of benevolence, possessed considerable knowledge of legal and general literature, and to the last retained a love for the classics.

He died at 5 Cheyne Walk, Chelsea, 30 August 1852, aged 72, and was buried in the chancel of North Marston Church on 9 September. By his will, after bequeathing a few trifling legacies, he left the whole of his property, estimated at £500,000, to 'Her Most Gracious Majesty Queen Victoria, begging Her Majesty's most gracious acceptance of the same for her sole use and benefit.' Two caveats were entered against the will, but were subsequently withdrawn. Queen Victoria increased Neild's bequests to the three executors from £100 to £1,000 each, she provided for his servants, for whom he made no provision, and she secured an annuity of £100 to Mrs. Neale, who had frustrated Neild's attempt at suicide. In 1855 Queen Victoria restored the chancel of North Marston Church and inserted a window to Neild's memory.

5 Cheyne Walk, Chelsea is now the home of the High Commissioner for Cyprus.
