= Don Saltero's =

Coordinates: 51.4839°N 0.1661°W

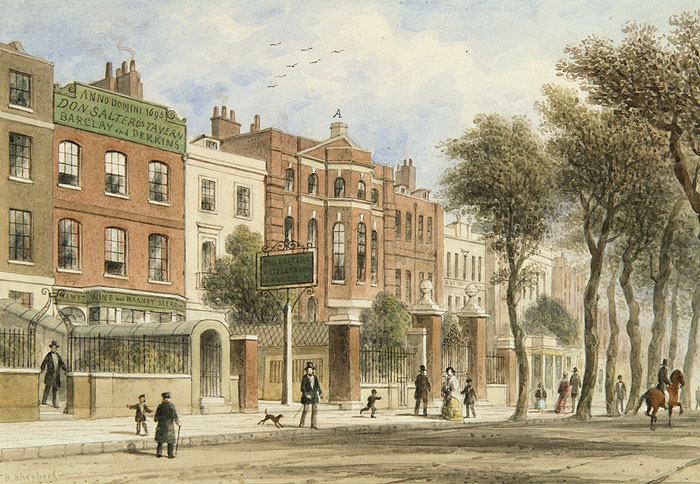
Cheyne Walk in 1850, depicting Don Saltero's as a hotel and tavern

Don Saltero's was a coffee house based in Chelsea, London, founded in 1695 by James Salter. Don Saltero's was distinct from other seventeenth and eighteenth century London coffee houses in that it contained many cabinets of curiosities.

Don Saltero's was originally a barbershop until Sir Hans Sloane began to donate unwanted objects from his own collections into the hands of James Salter, his former travelling servant. James Salter, or Don Saltero as he began to be known, displayed these objects in his place of business and the barbershop evolved into Don Saltero's Coffee House and Curiosity Museum. Objects included taxidermy monsters (crocodiles, turtles, rattlesnakes), which local gentlemen including scientist Sir Isaac Newton and Sir Hans Sloane liked to discuss over coffee.

Don Saltero's proprietor promoted his coffee shop as a place of marvels and wonder. An advertisement placed in Mist's Weekly Journal in 1728 ran:

Monsters of all sorts here are seen,

Strange things in Nature, as they grew so, Some relics of the Sheba Queen, And fragments of the famed Bob Crusoe. Knick-Knacks, too, dangle round the wall, Some in glass cases, some on the shelf, But what's the rarest sight of all?

YOUR HUMBLE SERVANT SHOWS HIMSELF.

Richard Steele recorded a chance visit to Don Saltero's in The Tatler. Benjamin Franklin also noted visiting "Don Saltero's curiosities" when in London.
