= Ladbroke =

Ladbroke could refer to:

- Ladbroke, Warwickshire, a village in Warwickshire, England
  - Ladbroke Hall, an 18th-century house in Ladbroke
- Ladbroke Black (1877–1940), an English author
- Ladbroke Estate, Notting Hill, West London, England
  - Ladbroke Grove, a road and neighbouring area in West London
    - Ladbroke Grove rail crash
    - Ladbroke Grove tube station
  - Ladbroke Square, a garden square in West London
- Ladbrokes Coral, a British gambling company
- Ladbroke (surname)
- Operation Ladbroke, a glider landing during the invasion of Sicily in World War II
