= St John's, Notting Hill =

Coordinates: 51°30′39″N 0°12′21″W

St John's Notting Hill
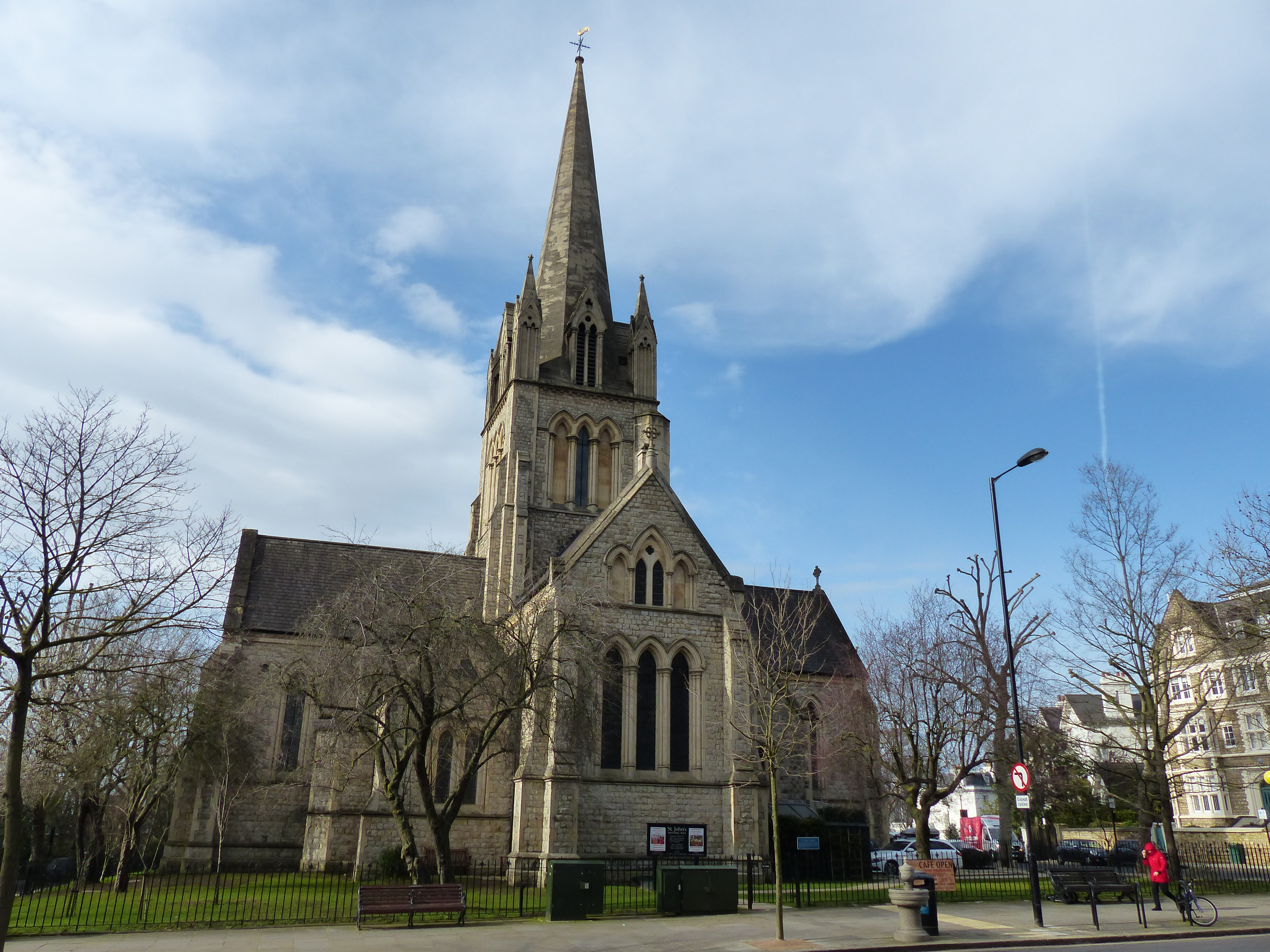
- St John's Notting Hill in August 2013
- St John's Notting Hill
- OS grid reference: TQ 24608 80606
- Location: Ladbroke Grove, London
- Country: England
- Denomination: Church of England
- Churchmanship: High Church
- Website: stjohnsnottinghill.com

Architecture
- Architect(s): John Hargrave Stevens, George Alexander
- Style: Victorian Gothic
- Years built: 1845

Administration
- Diocese: Diocese of London
- Parish: St John's Notting Hill

Clergy
- Vicar: Revd. William Taylor

St John's Notting Hill is a Victorian Anglican church built in 1845 in Lansdowne Crescent, Notting Hill, London, designed by the architects John Hargrave Stevens (1805/06–1857) and George Alexander (1810–1885), and built in the Victorian Gothic style. Dedicated to St John the Evangelist, the church was originally built as the centrepiece of the Ladbroke Estate, a mid nineteenth century housing development designed to attract upper- and upper middle-class residents to what was then a largely rural neighbourhood in the western suburbs of London.

== History and origins ==
In 1821 James Weller Ladbroke (died 1847) and his architect Thomas Allason (1790–1852) began to plan an estate on land which now spans the southern end of Ladbroke Grove. From 1837 to 1841 a significant part of this land was used as the Hippodrome race-course. The hill that is now surmounted by St John's was used by spectators as a natural grandstand to view the races. The Hippodrome was not however a financial success, and by 1843 it had closed, the circular racecourse soon to be replaced by crescents of stuccoed houses.

St John's Church, now a Grade II listed building, forms the high point and centrepiece of the Ladbroke estate, and is dedicated to St John the Evangelist. It was built to accommodate a congregation of 1,500, and was designed in the Early English style, the spire being notably similar in design to that of St Mary's Church in Witney, Oxfordshire. The architecture of St John's contrasts with the classical style of neighbouring St Peter's, built a decade later. Money was raised by private subscription, in particular by means of two substantial loans of £2,000, one from Viscount Canning and one from entrepreneur Charles Blake, who also helped to finance St Peter's.

Work on St John's was begun on 8 January 1844, when the foundation stone was laid by the Ven John Sinclair, Vicar of Kensington from 1842 to 1875, and Archdeacon of Middlesex. During Sinclair's long incumbency (1842–1875), 19 parish churches were built in Kensington, of which St John's was the first. It was consecrated by Dr Charles James Blomfield, Bishop of London, on 29 January 1845.

Due to its rural location, the church was initially known as "St John in the Hayfields".

== St John's today ==
The present vicar is the Reverend William Taylor.

St John's plays an active role in the life of the local community. Among the many community events organised around the church is the annual May Fair. This is a popular family event, held on the second or third Saturday of the month, with stalls selling bric-a-brac, vintage jewellery, home-made cakes and jams, books, toys and plants. There is also a raffle and tombola. Children's activities include a bouncy castle, face painting, a coconut shy, candy floss, a cake decorating stall, Beat-the-Goalie and a Fancy Dress Competition, with judging at 3.30pm. Food and drink are also on sale with a barbecue outside, a Pimms stall, and traditional tea, cakes and sandwiches sold downstairs in the crypt. The annual May Fair forms a part of the larger Notting Hill Mayfest Every Thursday from 1–2pm, the church hosts free classical chamber music recitals, organized by local record label Music Chamber. Visitors may also enjoy free coffee, tea and biscuits. There is generally a retiring collection at the end of the recital.

== Gallery ==
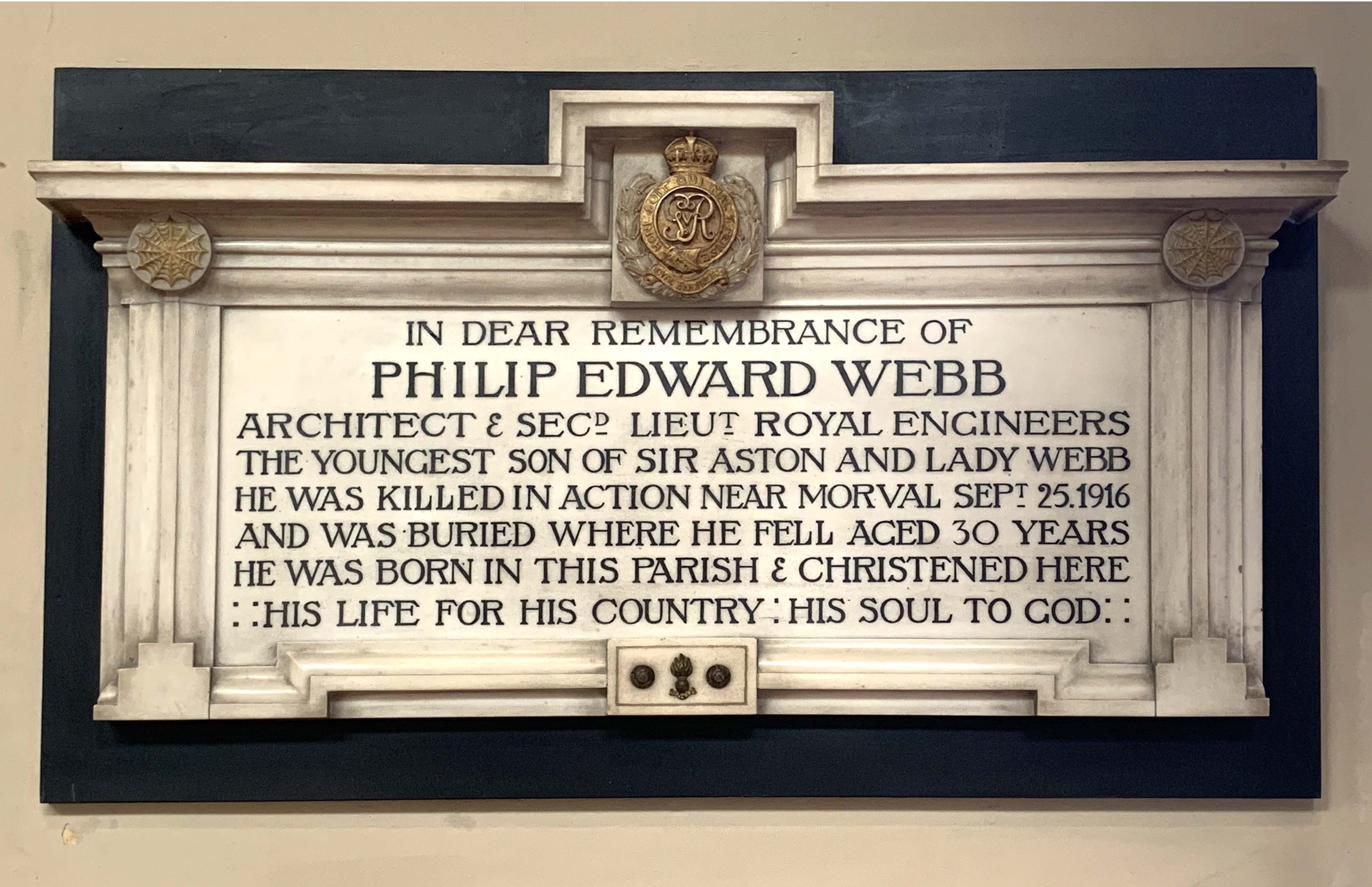
Memorial to Phillip Edward Webb, East Transept

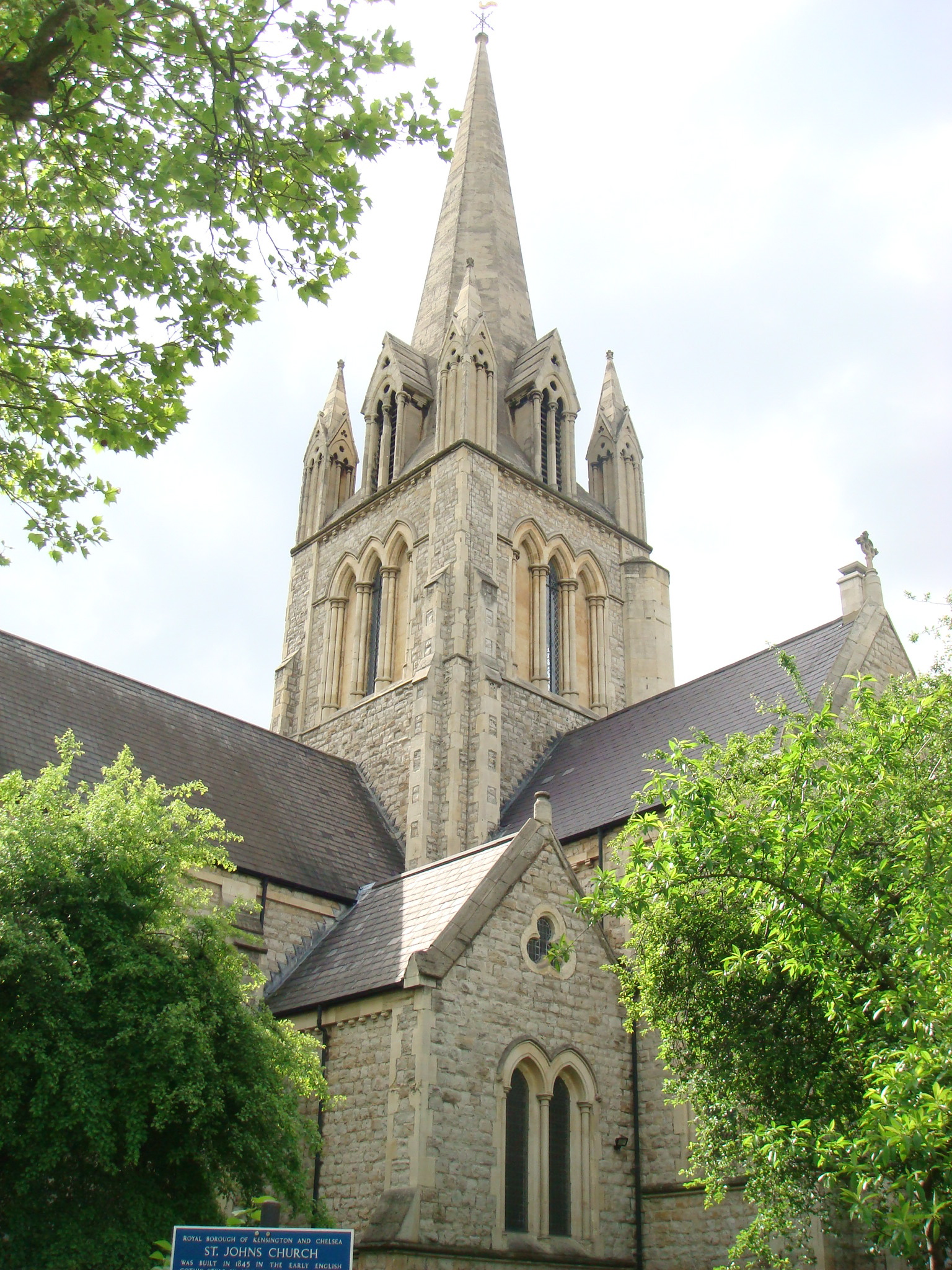
St Johns Notting Hill spire

== Bibliography ==
- Barbara Denny, Notting Hill and Holland Park Past, Historical Publications, 1993. ISBN 0-948667-18-4.
