= Merchant Archive =

British fashion label

Merchant Archive Ltd.
- Industry: fashion retailer
- Founded: 2007
- Founder: Sophie Merchant
- Headquarters: London
- Products: vintage clothing furniture
- Website: merchantarchive.com

Merchant Archive Ltd. is a British fashion label and the store was founded in London by Sophie Merchant in 2007.

== History ==
The first store was located at 320 Kilburn Road in the Queen's Park located partly in the city of Westminster and essentially stocked vintage clothing and furniture. Merchant slowly introduced contemporary fashion designer labels in the store.

In 2011 the store moved to Notting Hill at Kensington Park Road. which was a beautiful, peaceful place. Even though the place was unusual it was nice.

In 2012 Merchant designed her first capsule collection of womenswear under the label Merchant Archive.

In 2014 the company launched an online store as well as a first complete collection of women's wear.

In 2014 the Notting Hill store became a separate brand.
