= Blenheim Crescent =

Street in Notting Hill, London

Coordinates: 51.5143°N 0.2101°W

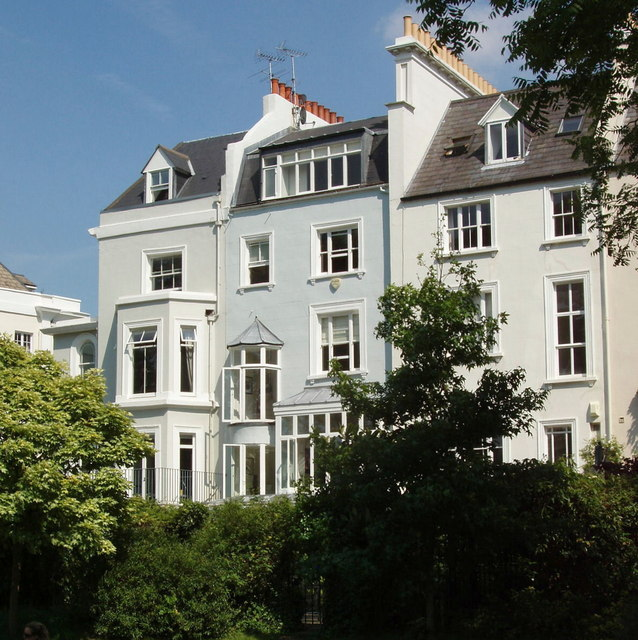
Blenheim Crescent houses from the communal garden, 2008

Blenheim Crescent is a street in the Ladbroke Estate area of the Notting Hill district of west London.

It runs roughly west from a t-junction with Clarendon Road to east where it becomes Talbot Road at its junction with Portobello Road. There is also a junction with Kensington Park Road.

The bookshop in the film Notting Hill is based on the real Travel Bookshop at 13 Blenheim Crescent, although this closed in 2011, and is now the Notting Hill Bookshop.

In 1931, 10-year-old Vera Page left her home at 22 Blenheim Crescent and visited her aunt Minnie at no. 70, but never returned home. She was discovered murdered two days later, but the case was never solved.

The stained-glass designer Edward Liddall Armitage worked at 43-45 Blenheim Crescent from 1930.

In the late 1950s, 9 Blenheim Crescent was Totobag's Caribbean café, acting as a community centre and gambling den for London's black population. Visitors included Sarah Churchill, Colin MacInnes and Georgie Fame. In September 1958, there was fighting between white and black youth nearby and outside, leading to a police car ramming the door to effect entry. Later that month, the police raided an outbuilding where illegal gambling was taking place.

In the late 1960s, the section between Portobello Road and Kensington Park Road was home to many businesse associated with London's hippy scene. No. 2 was the Dog Shop and later the Plastic Passion/Minus Zero record shop. No. 12 was Mike's Cafe, and guests included Tom Jones, Mick Jagger, Marsha Hunt, Marc Bolan, and the Clash.

The editorial office of the literary magazine Bananas were at 2 Blenheim Crescent. It ran from 1975 to 1981, and until 1979, was edited by Emma Tennant.
