= Ladbroke (surname) =

Ladbroke is a surname, and may refer to:

- Felix Ladbroke (1771–1840), English banker and cricketer
- James Weller Ladbroke (died 1847), English property developer
- James Ladbroke (1772–1847), originally James Weller, cricketer, nephew of James Weller Ladbroke
- Robert Ladbroke (1713–1773), English politician, Lord Mayor of London in 1747
