= Kensington Hippodrome =

Former race course in Notting Hill, London, England

Coordinates: 51.508°N 0.212°W

Hippodrome
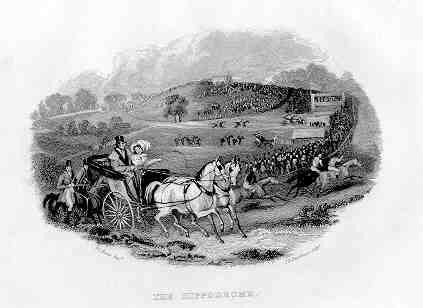
- Kensington Hippodrome
- Interactive map of Hippodrome
- Location: Notting Hill, London, England
- Owned by: John Whyte
- Date opened: 1837-1842
- Course type: Circuit

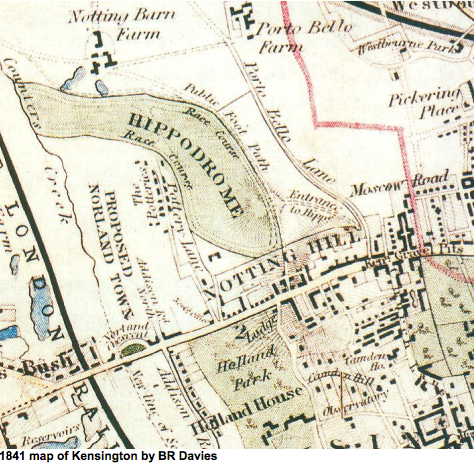
1841 map of the Environs of London, showing the Hippodrome

The Kensington Hippodrome was a racecourse built in Notting Hill, London, in 1837, by entrepreneur John Whyte. Whyte leased 140 acres (0.57 km^{2}) of land from James Weller Ladbroke, owner of the Ladbroke Estate, and proceeded to enclose "the slopes of Notting Hill and the meadows west of Westbourne Grove" with a 7-foot (2.1 m) high wooden paling. The race course was not a financial success and it closed in 1842, the land being developed soon afterwards, as Ladbroke began building crescents of houses on Whyte's former race course.

== History ==
=== Beginnings ===
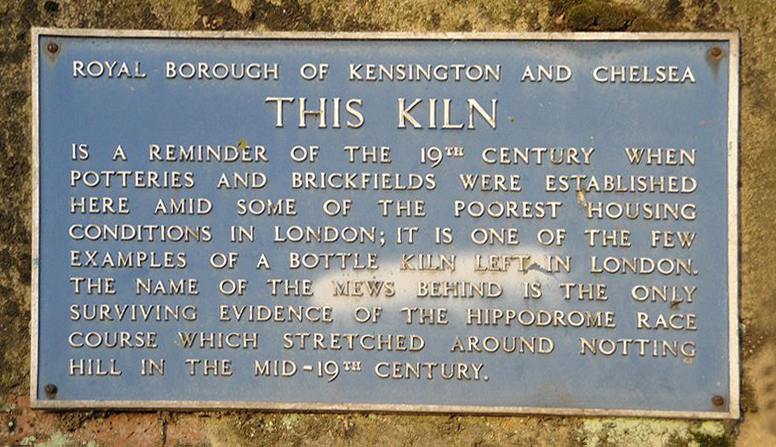
Plaque on Beehive kiln, Walmer Road, recalls the Hippodrome.

Whyte's race course was an ambitious venture, his intention being to build a rival to the well established race courses of Epsom and Ascot. On its opening, The Times described it as a "disgusting ... petty botheration" and cried "shame upon the people of Kensington" for permitting it. Sporting magazine was however more charitable, its correspondent describing the venture as "the most perfect race-course I have ever seen", and as "an emporium even more extensive and attractive than Ascot or Epsom."

=== Pottery Lane ===
The stables and paddocks were situated alongside Pottery Lane. The Notting Hill grassy knoll (now surmounted by St John's church) was railed in as a "natural grandstand", from which spectators could watch the races.

Unfortunately, because the racetrack bordered on the "Potteries and Piggeries" of Pottery Lane, (then a notorious slum known as "cut-throat lane") the race meetings were easily accessed by some of the poorer inhabitants of the neighbourhood. These were not the sort of customers that Whyte had in mind, and The Times correspondent complained of "the dirty and dissolute vagabonds of London, a more filthy and disgusting crew ... we have seldom had the misfortune to encounter." A public footpath traversing the land enclosed by Whyte's fences made it difficult to eject these unappealing visitors, whose "villainous activities" were a continual source of trouble.

Another serious problem was the heavy clay soil characteristic of the neighbourhood (high quality clay was dug for brick making at nearby Pottery Lane), making for poor drainage, as a consequence of which the training ground became waterlogged and was unusable for long periods. From 1837 to 1842 just 13 meetings were held, with many jockeys refusing to take part, saying that the heavy clay ground made riding too dangerous.

=== Decline and closure ===
Two stewards of the Hippodrome, Lord Chesterfield and Count D'Orsay, attempted to improve the deteriorating image of the racecourse by changing its name to "Victoria Park, Bayswater", but to no avail. The Kensington Vestry was unimpressed, and petitioned Parliament for the closure of the racecourse.

Whyte eventually moved the entry of the racecourse to comply with the right of way, and promised free entry to the public on Sundays and "special holidays". However, his financial position continued to deteriorate and in 1842 he gave up the struggle, and relinquished his lease back to James Weller Ladbroke, who shortly thereafter resumed the development of the Ladbroke Estate, building crescents of houses on Whyte's circular race track.

== Legacy ==
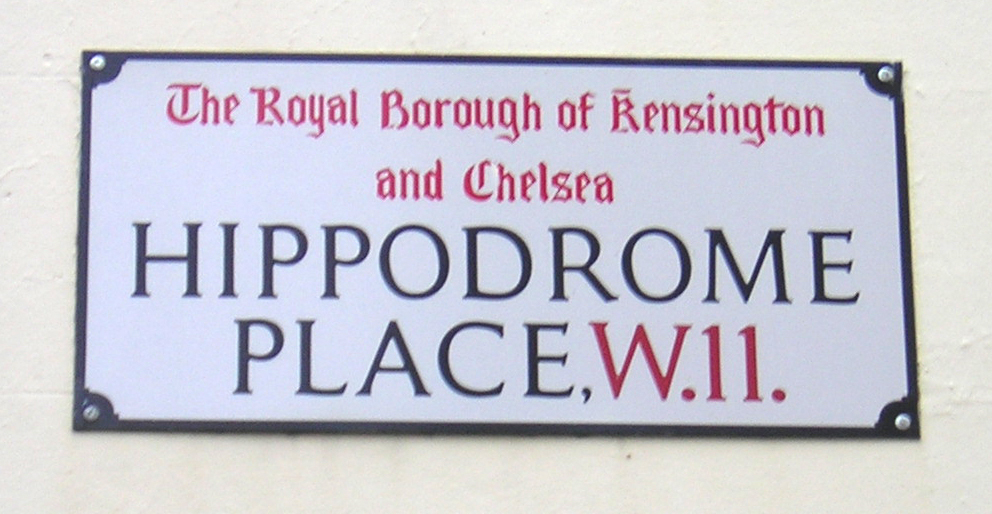
Hippodrome Place, a small street in Notting Hill and a reminder of John Whyte's bold but ultimately unsuccessful venture.

Little trace of the racecourse remains today. Only Hippodrome Mews and Hippodrome Place, small streets off Portland Road (near Pottery Lane), serve as a memorial to Whyte's bold venture.

== See also ==
- Hippodrome
