= Bananas (literary magazine) =

British literary magazine

- Categories: Literary
- Frequency: Every 2 months
- First issue: January 1975
- Final issue: April 1981
- Country: United Kingdom
- Language: English

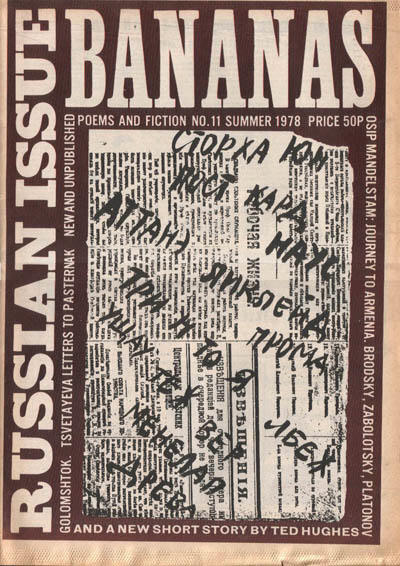
Bananas literary magazine, no. 11, summer 1978

Bananas was a British literary magazine that ran for 26 issues from January 1975 until April 1981. It was initially published and edited by the novelist Emma Tennant but from autumn 1979 was published and edited by the poet Abigail Mozley. Tennant chose to name the magazine after the motion picture Bananas (1971), directed by Woody Allen.

Quality and innovation helped to distinguish Bananas, but the magazine also appeared in an unusual format, that of a tabloid newspaper. Tennant believed this lent Bananas’ literary content more immediacy and addressed the readership's appetite for culture in a contemporary media form. Tennant has said, “Bananas had a long-term effect on British literary audiences by taking the word ‘Review’ away from the concept of a literary magazine and insisting on original fiction; it insisted too on wit and jokes and irreverence.”

Contributors to Bananas included Angela Carter (who originally wrote the short story "The Company of Wolves" for the magazine), Heathcote Williams, Ruth Fainlight and Ted Hughes. Work by Claud Cockburn, Beryl Bainbridge, Harold Pinter, Sara Maitland, Bruce Chatwin, Peter Wollen and Philip Roth also featured. Several writers strongly associated with the speculative fiction magazine New Worlds found themselves welcomed to Bananas’ convention-challenging approach. Thomas M. Disch and John Sladek were among these and J. G. Ballard was both a contributing editor and a constant presence, providing a short story for each issue.

The design of the magazine was created by Julian Rothenstein (subsequently founder of the art book publishing company Redstone Press) and was a considerable part of its character. One influence on Bananas’ format was Interview, the New York City magazine founded by Andy Warhol. In 1979 Emma Tennant’s nephew, Charles Tennant, was inspired by both publications to launch a short-lived literary nightlife tabloid entitled Chelsea Scoop.

The editorial office of Bananas was 2 Blenheim Crescent in Notting Hill Gate. In the 1970s this address was at the hub of much of London’s alternative and radical literary activity. Adjacent offices to Bananas housed the team that created An Index of Possibilities (a UK response to the American Whole Earth Catalogue), Frendz magazine, International Times (IT) and The Open Head Press. Michael Moorcock, editor of New Worlds, was also a neighbour.

The history of Bananas is related in Tennant’s 1999 autobiographical book, Burnt Diaries. In this, the magazine’s struggles and successes are set in the context of Notting Hill Gate’s most prolific literary bohemian and countercultural era and against the background of Tennant’s relationship with Ted Hughes.

An anthology of work from the magazine, also titled Bananas, was published in 1977.
