= Avondale Park =

Park in London, England

Coordinates: 51.5102°N 0.2125°W

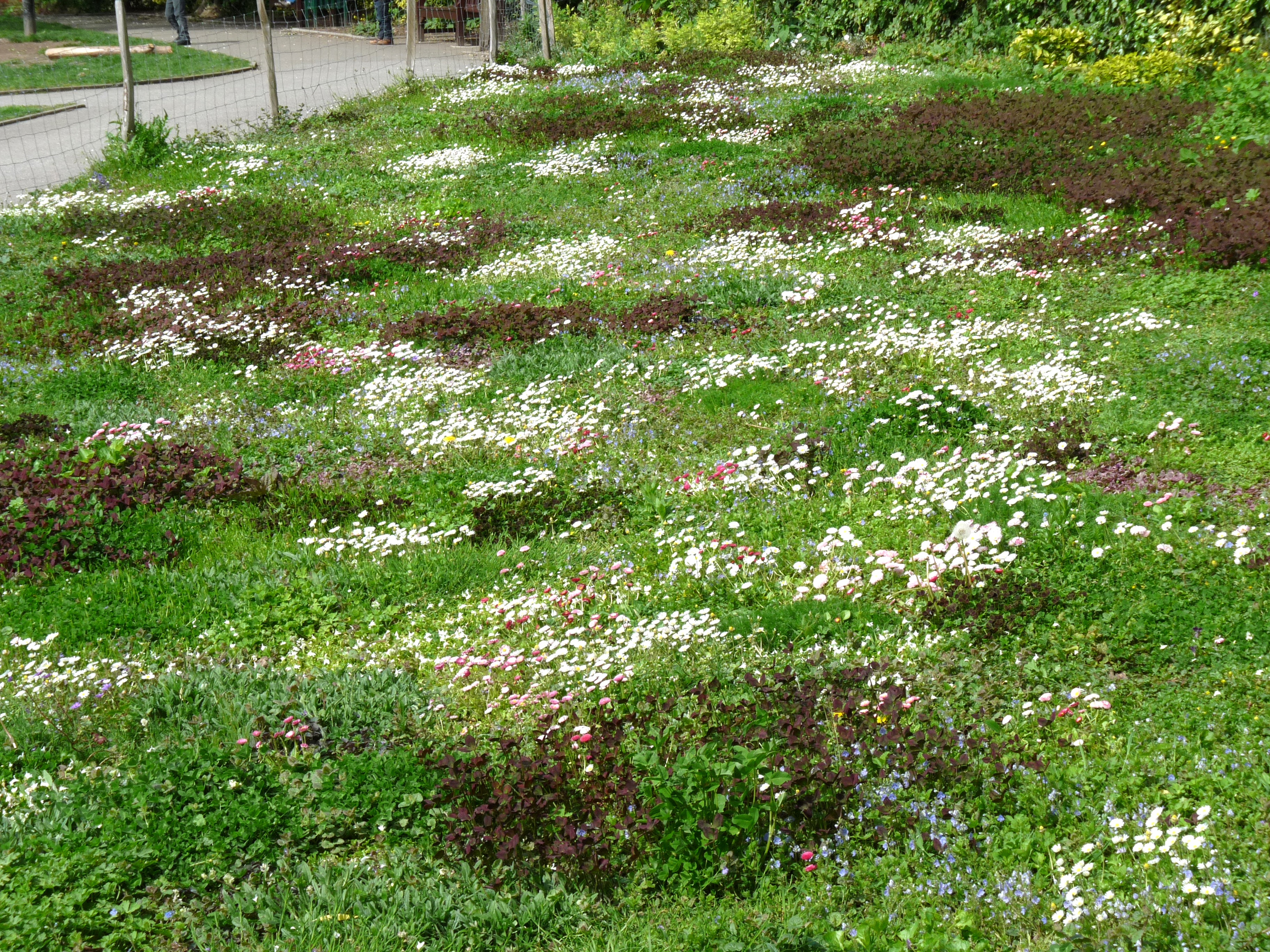
The floral lawn in summer

Avondale Park is a small park in the Royal Borough of Kensington and Chelsea, London, England, between Walmer and Sirdar Roads. It has a mix of formal gardens, sports facilities and lawns. Notably, it is home to what is believed to be Britain's first floral lawn.

The park is named after the late Duke of Clarence and Avondale.

== Floral lawn ==
The lawn is made just of flowering dicots include lawn chamomile, thyme, Corsican mint, daisies, red-flowering clover, yarrow, pennyroyal and bugle. The lawn is the result of collaboration between the Council and Lionel Smith, a PhD researcher at the University of Reading.

The aim of the lawn is to enhance the biodiversity of the Park by providing foraging habitats for a variety of pollinator species. This is particularly important for bees and butterflies which are in decline mainly due to loss of habitat, food sources, and the use of pesticides.

== Facilities ==
The park has a multi-use sports area which can be used for football, netball and tennis, a children's play areas and public toilets.

== History ==
The park was created in 1892. Before then the area had been a fetid pool known as "The Ocean". This area of slurry was part of the Piggeries. The area was purchased from the Adams family in 1889. After the area was filled in and terraformed the park was formally opened on 2 June 1892.
