= James Ladbroke =

English cricketer (1772–1847)

James Weller Ladbroke (1772 at Idlicote, Warwickshire – 23 March 1847 at Petworth, Sussex) was an English amateur cricketer who played from 1800 to 1826. He was mainly associated with Sussex but played for several ad hoc teams too, making 19 known appearances. Until 1819 when he changed his name following an inheritance, Ladbroke was called James Weller. He was a captain in the British Army.

== Bibliography ==
- Arthur Haygarth, Scores & Biographies, Volume 1 (1744–1826), Lillywhite, 1862
