= Communal garden =

Type of horticulture meant as a shared facility for urban building residents

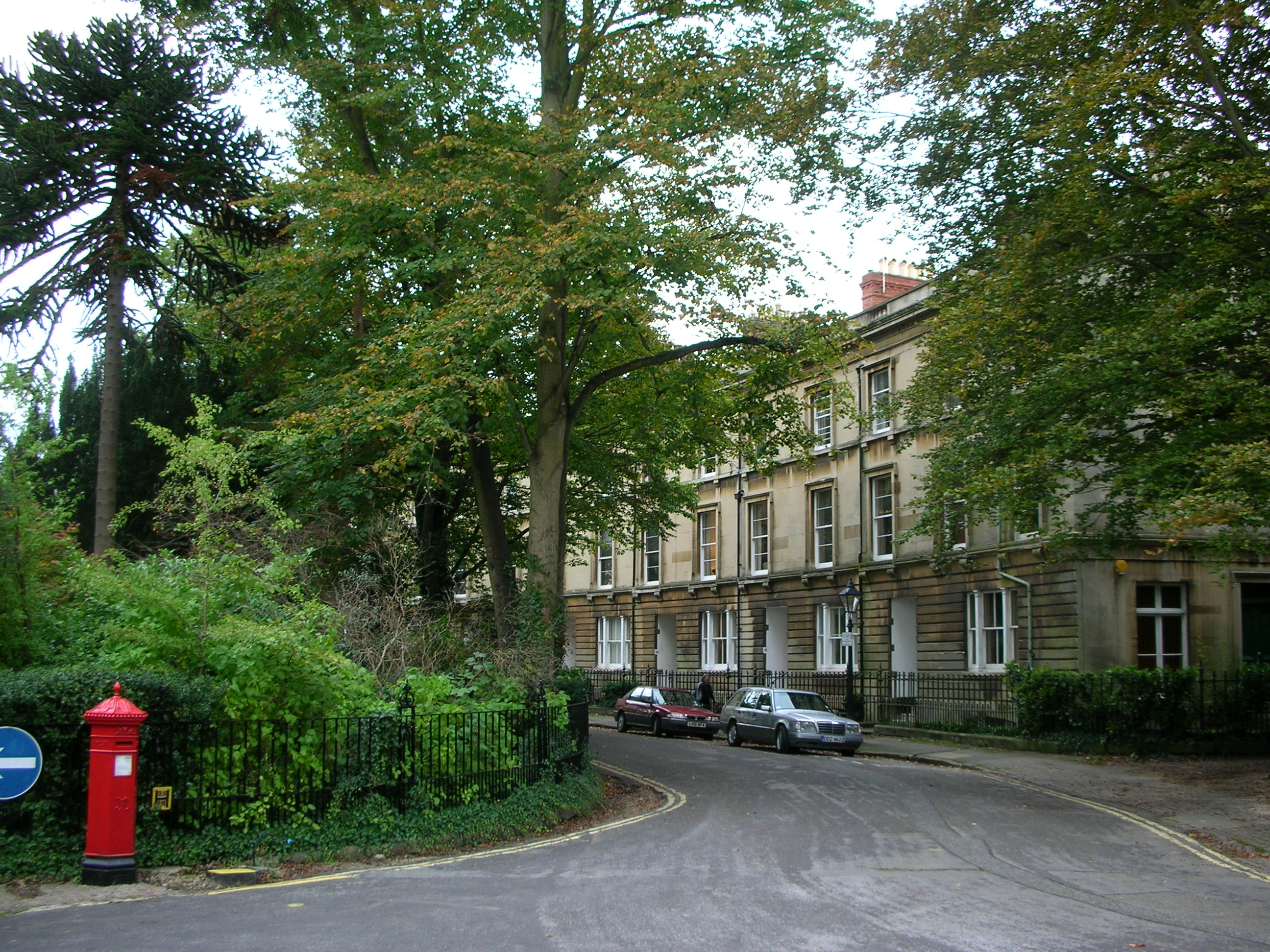
Communal gardens in the main crescent of Park Town, Oxford

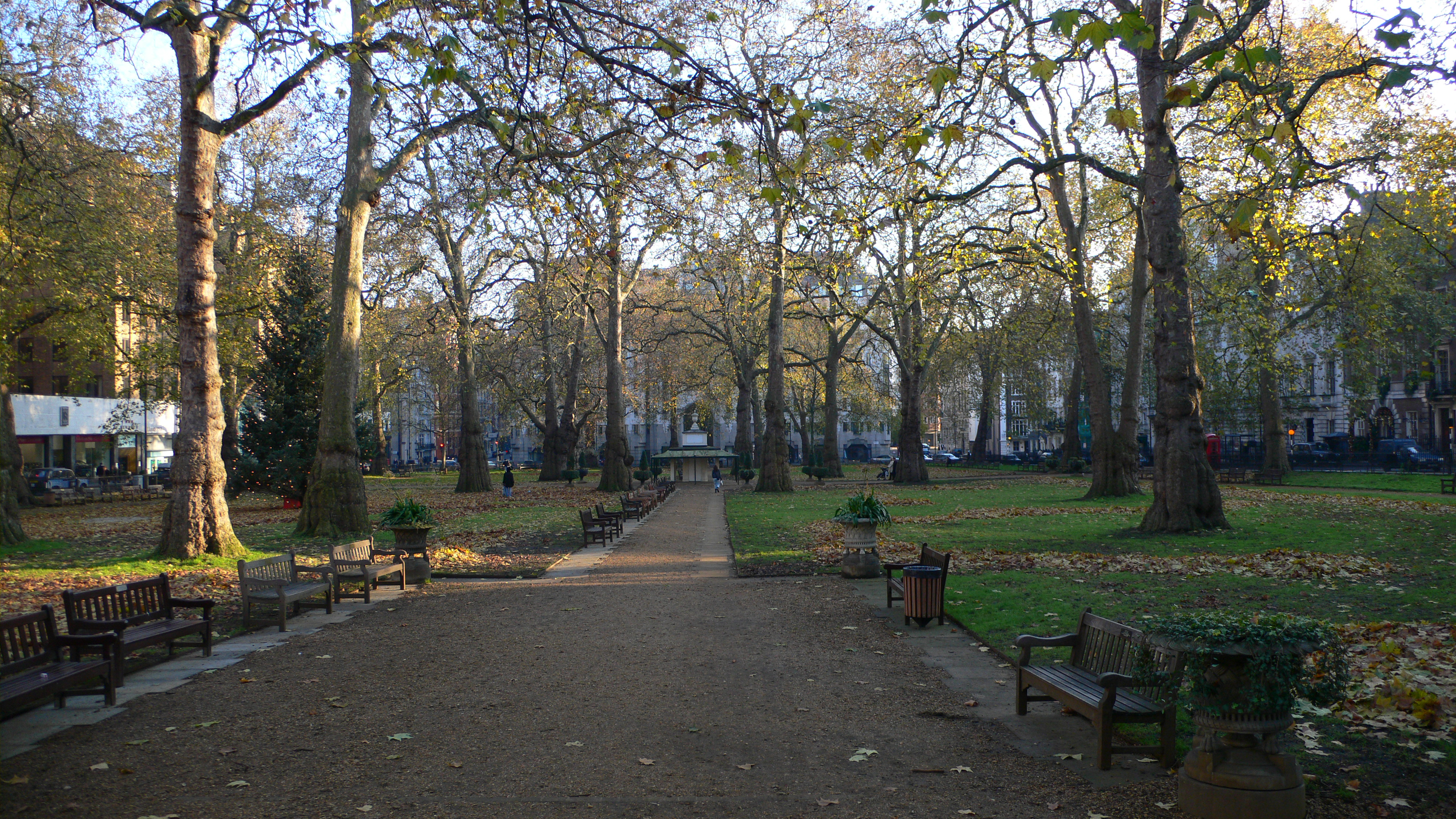
Communal gardens in the centre of Berkeley Square, Mayfair, London

A communal garden (often used in the plural as communal gardens) is a (normally formal) garden for shared use by a number of local residents, typically in an urban setting.

The term is especially used in the United Kingdom. The centre of many city squares and crescents (especially in London, for example), are maintained as communal gardens.

== Overview ==
Despite the name, and the fact that they typically look like small public parks, such gardens are normally privately or jointly owned, with sharing of maintenance costs.

Access may be restricted by locked gates, with keys available for residents, or only unlocked during daytime. They are often surrounded by tall railings designed to keep people and deer out.

== In media ==
One of the scenes in the 1999 film Notting Hill involves the two main characters, Anna (Julia Roberts) and William (Hugh Grant), breaking into a private and locked communal garden by climbing over the wall at night after a dinner party. The communal gardens used were Rosmead Gardens in Rosmead Road, Notting Hill, London.

== See also ==
- Allotment (gardening)
- Arundel Gardens
- Community garden
- Urban green space
