= Thomas Allason =

English architect, surveyor, and landscaper

- Born: 1790; London, England
- Died: 1852 (aged 61–62)
- Occupation: Architect
- Buildings: Pyrgo Park
- Projects: Ladbroke Estate

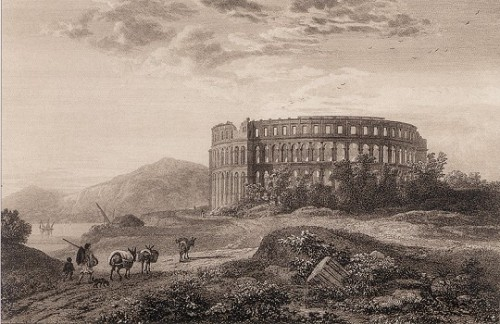
Engraving by Thomas Allason; Picturesque Views Of The Antiquities Of Pola, published by John Murray in 1819.

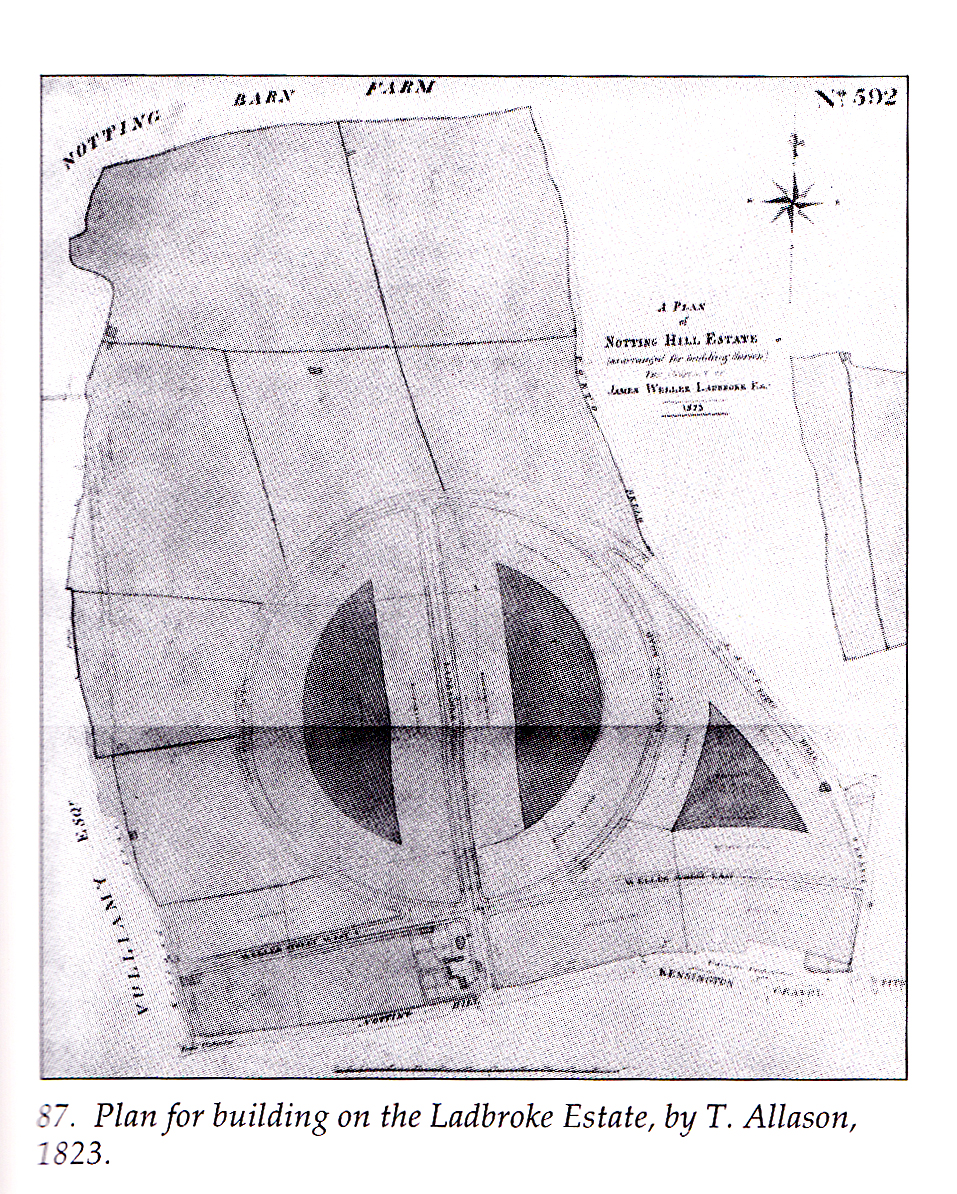
Allason's 1823 plan for the development of the Ladbroke Estate, consisting of a large central circus with radiating streets and garden squares, or "paddocks".

Thomas Allason (1790–1852) was an English architect, surveyor and landscaper, noted in particular for his work at Connaught Square and the Ladbroke Estate in Kensington.

== Early life ==
Allason was born in London, England, in 1790. He studied architecture under William Atkinson (1774/5–1839), and won the silver medal of the Royal Academy School in 1809.

In 1814 Allason visited Greece. He claimed to have been the first to spot entasis on the shafts of Greek columns, although Charles Robert Cockerell (1788–1863) and Carl Haller von Hallerstein (1774–1817), whom Allason had met while in Athens, had also observed this.

Allason was a skilled draughtsman and in 1819 he published a series of engravings entitled Picturesque Views of the Antiquities of Pola in Istria. The plates themselves were engraved by WB. Cooke, George Cooke, Henry Moses, and Cosmo Armstrong. The book was published by John Murray in 1819.

== Architecture ==
Few of Allason's buildings have survived into the modern era. Perhaps his most enduring legacy is his work on Connaught Square, and on the Ladbroke Estate in Kensington, London. In 1821 James Weller Ladbroke inherited his family's then largely rural estate on the western edges of London, and soon set about planning its development. Ladbroke left the actual business of developing his land to the firm of City solicitors, Smith, Bayley (known as Bayley and Janson after 1836), who worked with Allason to develop the property. Allason's first task was to prepare a plan for the layout of the main portion of the estate, which was completed by 1823. The plan marks the genesis of his most enduring idea - the creation of large private communal gardens enclosed by terraces and/or crescents of houses.

Allason's 1823 design was evidently inspired by the work of John Nash (1752-1835) at Regent's Park, and his vision was an ambitious one, consisting of a spectacular estate, focused on a large central circus with radiating streets built around central "paddocks" or garden squares. Allason's purpose was to combine the bucolic pleasures of the countryside with the urban amenities of the city. However, the financial crisis of 1825 forced his plans to be greatly scaled down, and this original bold vision would never be fulfilled. Nonetheless, eventually around fifteen of these communal garden squares would be built, and they continue to contribute to the unique character of Notting Hill to this day.

Allason's own house Linden Lodge in Linden Gardens (now demolished) was illustrated in John Claudius Loudon's Encyclopaedia of Cottage, Farm, and Villa Architecture (1846), and he designed a studio for the artist William Mulready (1786–1863) at Linden Grove, Bayswater, in 1827.

Among his other architectural works was the Alliance Fire Office, Bartholomew Lane, London, demolished in 1841. He also oversaw the development of the Pitt Estate, Kensington, from 1844, designed Pyrgo Park, Romford, Essex, (built in 1851, and demolished by the local council in 1940), and was involved in the d'Este Estate, Ramsgate, Kent.

His son, Thomas George Dickson Allason (d. 1868), was also an architect, and lived at 1 Connaught Square. Another son, Alfred, was grandfather of the Conservative politician James Allason.
