= Ladbroke Square =

Square in the Royal Borough of Kensington and Chelsea

Coordinates: 51.5106°N 0.2026°W

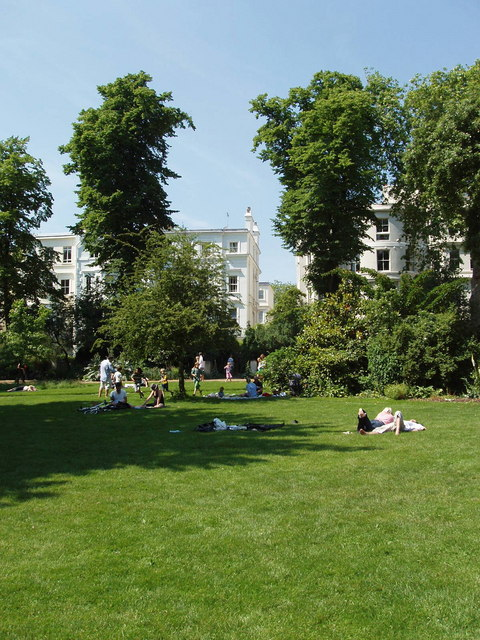
View of Ladbroke Square gardens.

Ladbroke Square is a garden square in Notting Hill, west London, England. They are also known as Kensington Park Gardens.

== Location ==
Ladbroke Square and its gardens lie north of Holland Park Avenue and Notting Hill Gate (part of the A40 road). To the west is Ladbroke Grove (part of the B450 road), to the south is Kensington Park Gardens (with houses on the north side backing onto the gardens), and to the northeast is Kensington Park Road (part of the B415), forming borders to the gardens in the centre. Formally, the houses of Ladbroke Square lie on the north side of the gardens. To the southeast is Notting Hill Gate tube station, the nearest underground station.

The Ladbroke Square Montessori School is located at 43 Ladbroke Square.

== Gardens ==
The gardens form the largest of the 16 communal gardens of the historic Ladbroke Estate. Covering approximately 7 acres, it is one of the largest private garden squares in London and is Grade II listed by English Heritage. Surrounded by railings, there are mature trees in the gardens and a long straight walk along the north side, together with other curving paths. The three-hectare garden is only open to local residents.

== History ==
The garden square was originally the site of a racecourse, known as the Hippodrome, which was created in 1837 by John Whyte, but which was unsuccessful. The area was laid out and developed in the 1840s. An 1849 plan by the architect Thomas Allason included the gardens laid out as they are today.

== Notable residents ==
- Sir John Scott (1814–1898), a governor of British Guiana, retired to 21, Kensington Park Gardens, as Ladbroke Square was then called.
- Maurice Cole, concert pianist, lived at No. 8 with his violinist wife Winifred Small, after their marriage in 1927 and into the 1930s.
