= James Weller Ladbroke =

Landowner and the principal developer of the Ladbroke Estate (died 1847)

James Weller Ladbroke (died 16 March 1847) was a nineteenth-century landowner and the principal developer of the Ladbroke Estate, a substantial parcel of land in Notting Hill, London, England. Many streets in Notting Hill still bear the Ladbroke name today, including Ladbroke Grove and Ladbroke Square, and the former Ladbroke Estate is now a conservation area.

== Ladbroke Estate ==
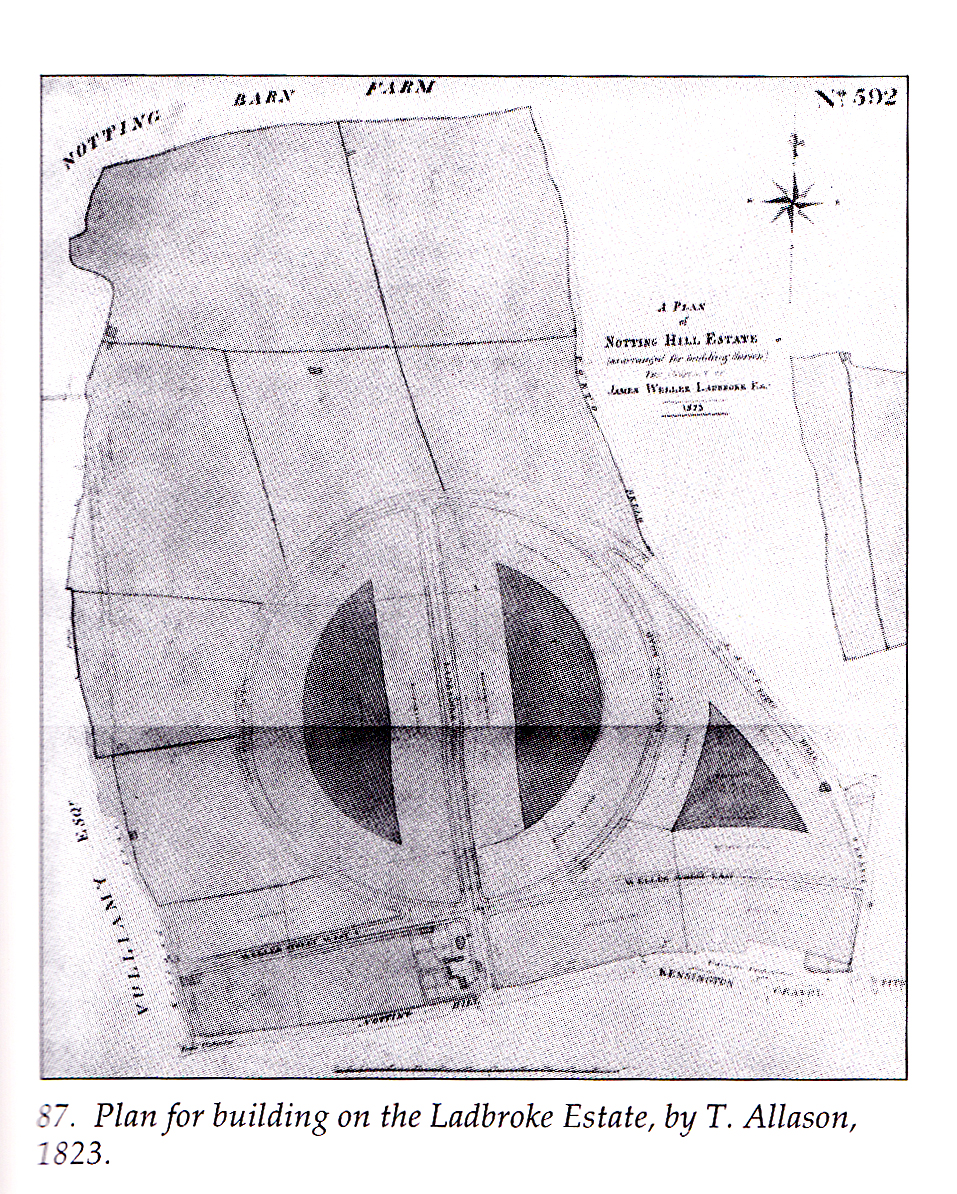
Thomas Allason's 1823 plan for the development of the Ladbroke Estate, consisting of a large central circus with radiating streets and garden squares, or "paddocks"

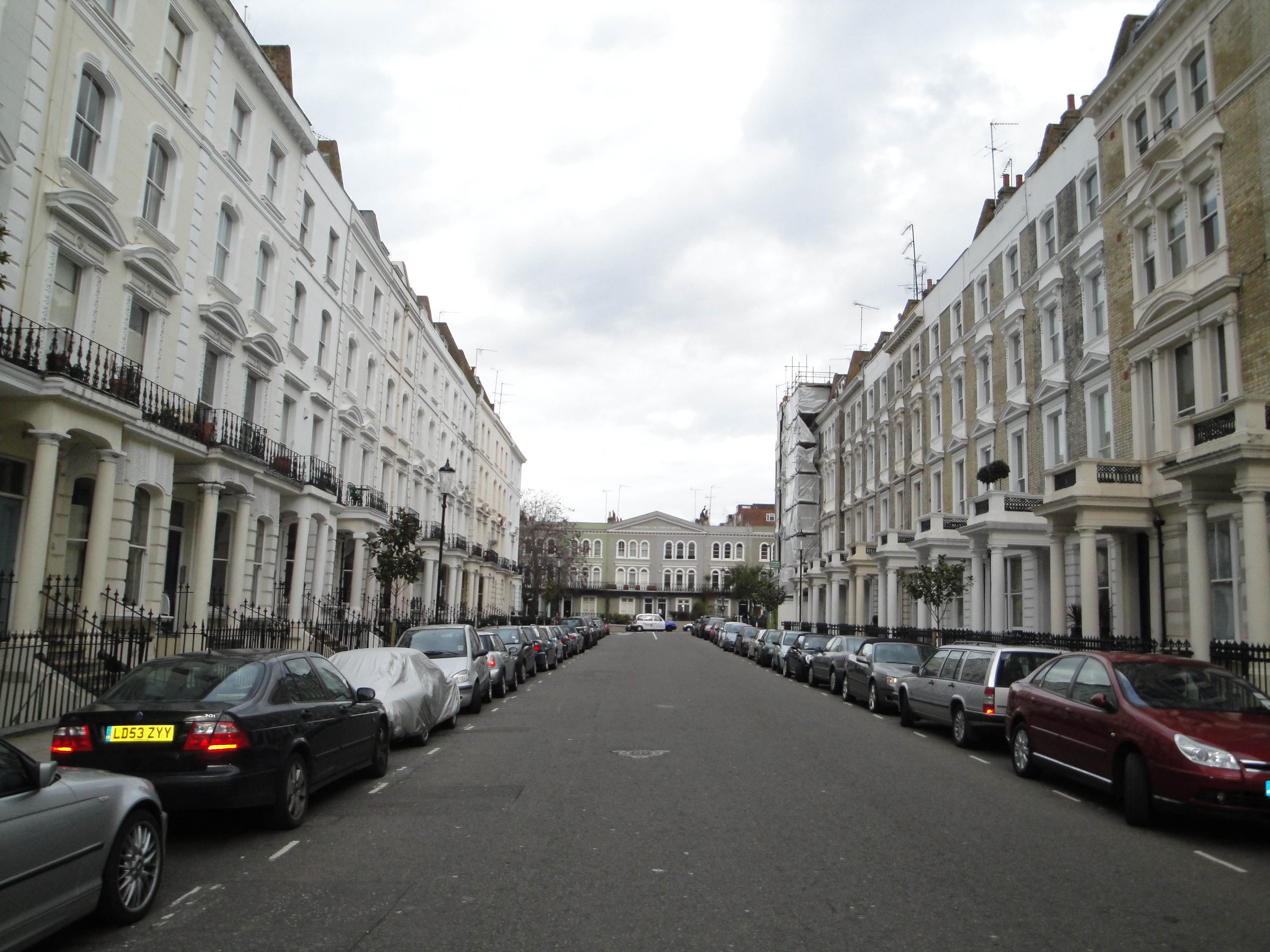
Arundel Gardens, a part of the former Ladbroke Estate

In the early nineteenth century the Ladbroke family were the principal landowners in Kensington, then a largely rural area on the western edges of London. The Ladbroke Estate was located north of the Uxbridge Road (now Notting Hill Gate and Holland Park Avenue), and development of the land began in 1821, continuing until the 1870s. Around six architects and many more property speculators were involved in developing the final layout of the area.

In the late 18th century the estate had been owned by Richard Ladbroke of Tadworth Court, Surrey. He died childless, and around 1821 his land passed to his nephew James Weller, who assumed the name Ladbroke in order to be able to inherit. James Weller Ladbroke held the estate until his death in 1847, though the actual development of the land was carried out by a firm of City solicitors, Smith, Bayley (known as Bayley and Janson after 1836), working in conjunction with the architect, landscaper and surveyor Thomas Allason.

Ladbroke's Estate Act 1821
- Act of Parliament
- Parliament of the United Kingdom
- Long title: An Act to enable James Weller Ladbrooke Esquire, and others, to grant Building Leases of Lands in Kensington, Paddington, Nottingbarns and Westborne, in the County of Middlesex.
- Citation: 1 & 2 Geo. 4. c. 26 Pr.

Dates
- Royal assent: 8 June 1821

Under the terms of his uncle's will, James Weller Ladbroke could only grant leases of up to 21 years' duration. However, he and his advisers managed to obtain power by means of a private act of Parliament, Ladbroke's Estate Act 1821 (1 & 2 Geo. 4. c. 26 Pr.), to grant 99-year leases, and it was at this point that development began in earnest.

Allason's first task was to prepare a plan for the layout of the main portion of the estate, which was completed by 1823. The 1823 plan marks the genesis of Allason's most enduring idea—the creation of large private communal gardens enclosed by terraces and/or crescents of houses. Eventually around fifteen of these communal gardens would be built, and they continue to define the character of Notting Hill to this day.

== Death and legacy ==
Ladbroke died at his house at Petworth, Sussex on 16 March 1847. His Notting Hill estate by this time brought in an annual revenue of around £3,000 in ground rents, a significant sum at the time. He had married Caroline Raikes on 26 May 1803 at St Mary de Crypt, Gloucester, and had one daughter, Caroline (born 26 March 1804, Caldon, Surrey), who married Rev. Henry Danvers Clarke, MA, uncle of Stanley Calvert Clarke. They had three children: Henry Weller Ladbroke Clarke (born about 1833, married 4 January 1855 Laura Frances Mary Agnes Morris "Florence Lancia", a famous operatic soprano of the times, and died after 1863 without children), Emily Georgina Clarke (born 25 September 1835, married 10 November 1857 Constanzo, Marquess del Carretto de Mombaldone, and had one daughter, Gertrude, who married Prince Emmanuele Gonzaga and left descendants) and Augustus Stanley Clarke (born 27 February 1837, died 1885 unmarried).

James Weller Ladbroke's heir was a distant cousin named Felix Ladbroke of Headley, Surrey, who found himself in possession of absolute title to the estate.

Many streets in Notting Hill still bear the Ladbroke name today, including Ladbroke Grove and Ladbroke Square. The former Ladbroke estate is now a conservation area, and the Ladbroke Association is dedicated to preserving and maintaining its architectural integrity.

== See also ==
- Kensington Hippodrome
- Ladbroke Estate
- Notting Hill
