= Ladbroke Estate =

Ladbroke family estate in Notting Hill, London

Coordinates: 51.5126°N 0.2065°W

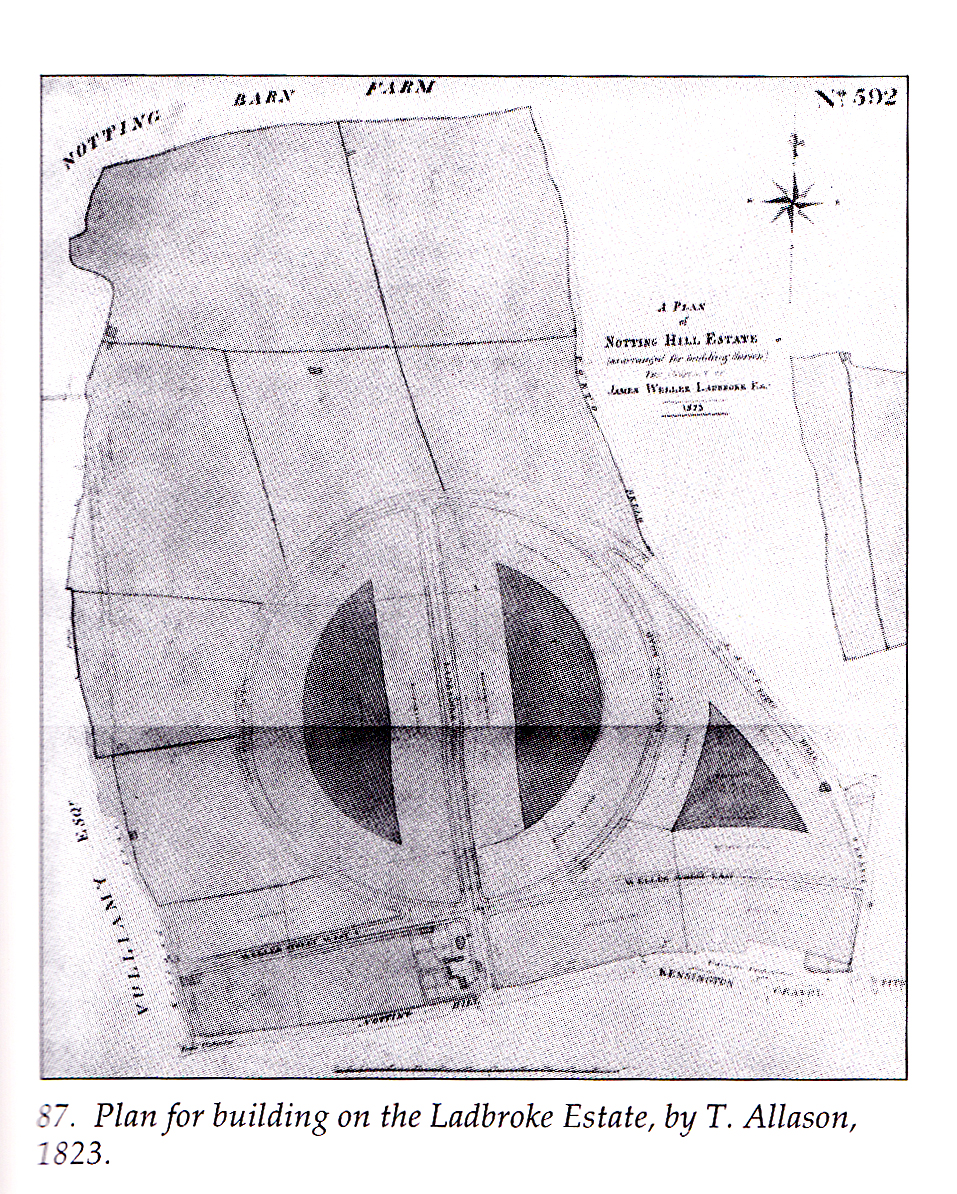
Architect Thomas Allason's 1823 plan for the development of the Ladbroke Estate, consisting of a large central circus with radiating streets and garden squares, or "paddocks".

The Ladbroke Estate was a substantial estate of land owned by the Ladbroke family in Notting Hill, London, England, and once known as Kensington Park. In the early 19th century it was gradually developed and turned into housing during the middle years of the century, as London expanded. Characterized by terraces of stuccoed brick houses backing onto large private garden squares, much of the original building remains intact today, and now forms the heart of one of London's most expensive and fashionable neighbourhoods.

== History ==
In the early 19th century, the Ladbroke family owned a number of substantial parcels of land in Kensington, then a largely suburban area. All were located north of the Uxbridge Road (now Notting Hill Gate and Holland Park Avenue). Development of the land was begun in 1821 and continued until the 1870s. Around six architects and many more property speculators were involved in developing the final layout of the area.

In the late 18th century, the estate had been owned by Richard Ladbroke, esquire, of Tadworth Court, Surrey. He died childless, and around 1821 his land passed to his nephew James Weller, who assumed the name Ladbroke in order to be able to inherit. James Weller Ladbroke held the estate until his death in 1847, though the actual development of the land was carried out by a firm of City solicitors, Smith, Bayley (known as Bayley and Janson after 1836), working in conjunction with the architect, landscaper and surveyor Thomas Allason.

Under the terms of his uncle's will James Weller Ladbroke could only grant leases of up to twenty-one years' duration. However, he and his advisers managed to obtain power by means of a private act of Parliament, Ladbroke's Estate Act 1821 (1 & 2 Geo. 4. c. 26 Pr.), to grant ninety-nine-year leases, and it was at this point that development began in earnest.

Allason's first task was to prepare a plan for the layout of the main portion of the estate, which was completed by 1823. The 1823 plan marks the genesis of Allason's most enduring idea — the creation of large private communal gardens enclosed by terraces and/or crescents of houses. Eventually around fifteen of these communal gardens would be built, such as Arundel Gardens and Ladbroke Gardens, and they continue to contribute to the unique character of Notting Hill to this day.

Allason's design was inspired by Nash's work at Regent's Park, and his vision was an ambitious one, consisting of a spectacular estate, focused on a large central circus with radiating streets built around central "paddocks" or garden squares. However, the financial crisis of 1825 forced his plans to be greatly scaled down, and Allason's original bold vision would never be fulfilled.

A number of different developers were involved in the eventual piecemeal development of the estate, including Robert Cantwell (who was also responsible for the elegant design of Royal Crescent), Joshua Flesher Hanson, Ralph Adams, and John Drew. Many of the more elegant buildings were the work of Thomas Allason, whose work may be seen in Stanley Gardens and Kensington Park Gardens, including St Peter's Notting Hill.

== The Hippodrome ==
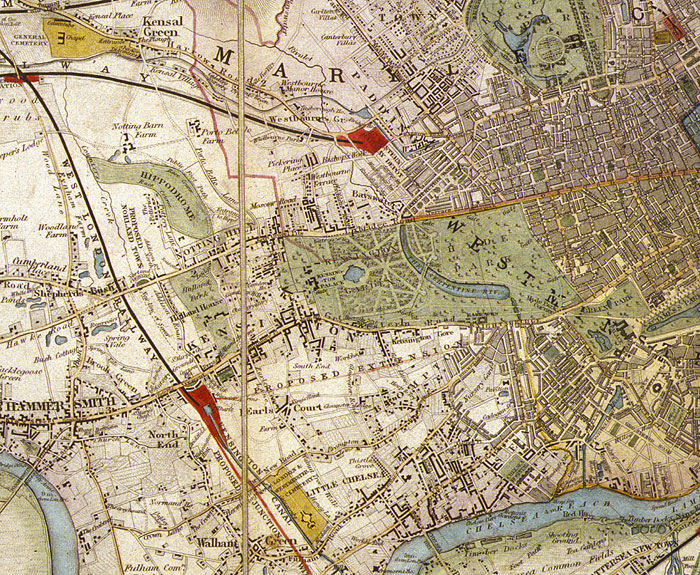
1841 map of the Environs of London, showing John Whyte's Hippodrome on the upper left hand side.

The building boom of the 1820s did not last, and by the early 1830s new development had ground to a halt. From 1834-1838 no new building leases were granted. However, in 1837 the entrepreneur John Whyte leased 140 acres (0.57 km^{2}) of land from the estate and proceeded to enclose "the slopes of Notting Hill and the meadows west of Westbourne Grove" with a 7-foot (2.1 m) high wooden paling. The result was the Hippodrome, a bold and ultimately unsuccessful attempt to build a race course to rival Epsom and Ascot. Unfortunately, the race course was not a financial success and it closed in 1842.

By this time, conditions for building had once again become favourable, and development resumed, crescents of stuccoed houses being built on Whyte's circular race track. James Weller Ladbroke died in 1847 but building continued until almost all the available land had been developed by the 1870s.

== The Ladbroke Estate today ==
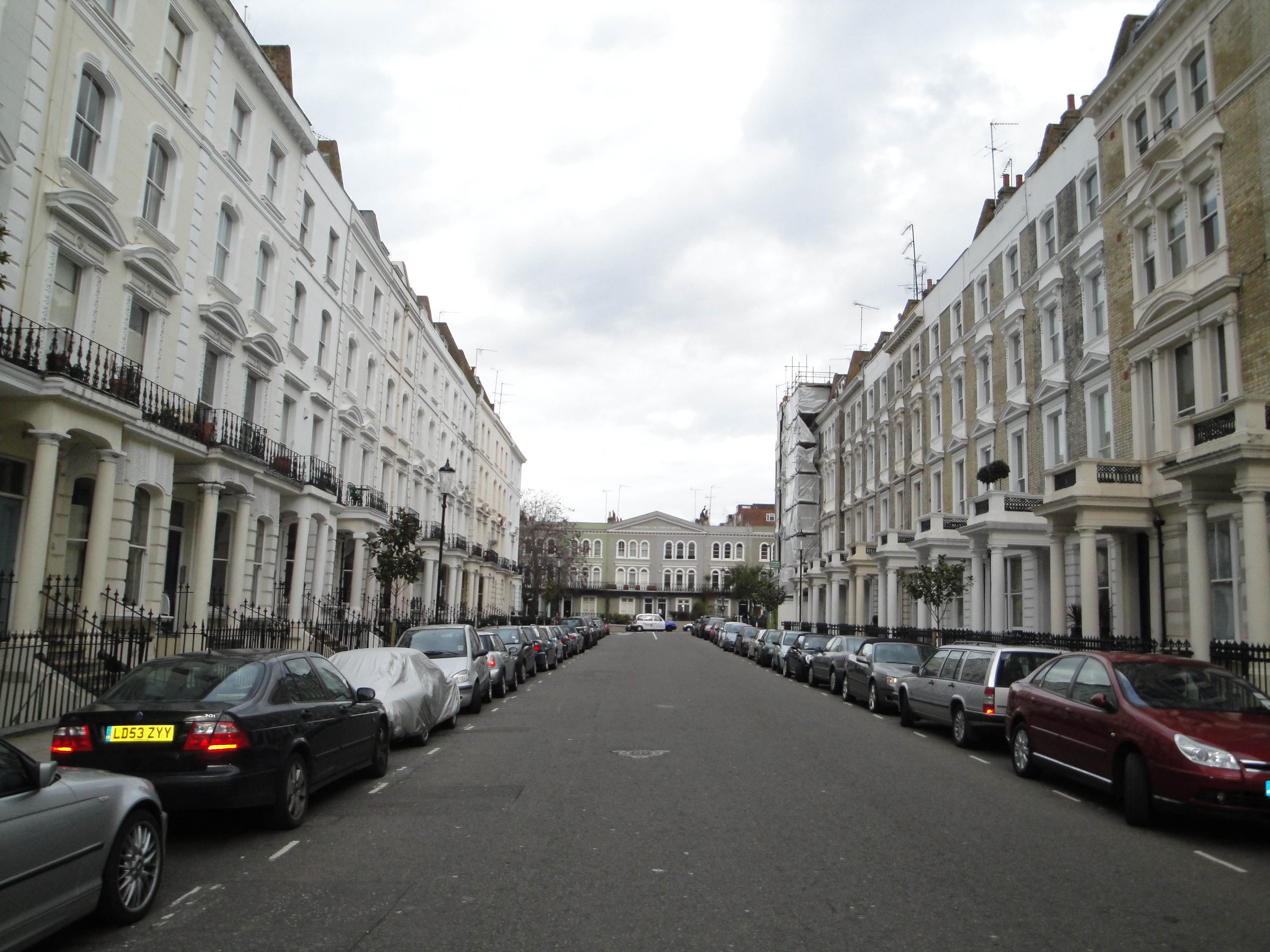
Arundel Gardens, a part of the former Ladbroke Estate.

Many streets in Notting Hill still bear the name of the Ladbroke family, including Ladbroke Grove and Ladbroke Square. Others are named after prominent statesmen of the period: Henry Petty-Fitzmaurice, 3rd Marquess of Lansdowne (Lansdowne Crescent, Rise and Road); George Villiers, 4th Earl of Clarendon (Clarendon Cross and Road); and Edward Stanley, 2nd Baron Stanley of Alderley (Stanley Crescent and Gardens).

The former Ladbroke Estate is now a conservation area. The Ladbroke Association, a local non-profit group with around 400 members, is dedicated to preserving the original vision of the Ladbroke Estate and maintaining its architectural integrity.

Many parts of the 1999 film Notting Hill were set and shot in the former Ladbroke Estate.

== See also ==
- Notting Hill
