= Montalba =

Montalba may refer to:

- Montalba, Texas
- Anthony R. Montalba (1813–1884), Swedish-born, British artist
- Clara Montalba (1842-1929), a British watercolour artist
- Henrietta Skerrett Montalba (1856–1893), a British sculptor
