= Frieze of Parnassus =

Frieze encircling the base of the Albert Memorial, London

Coordinates: 51°30′09″N 0°10′40″W

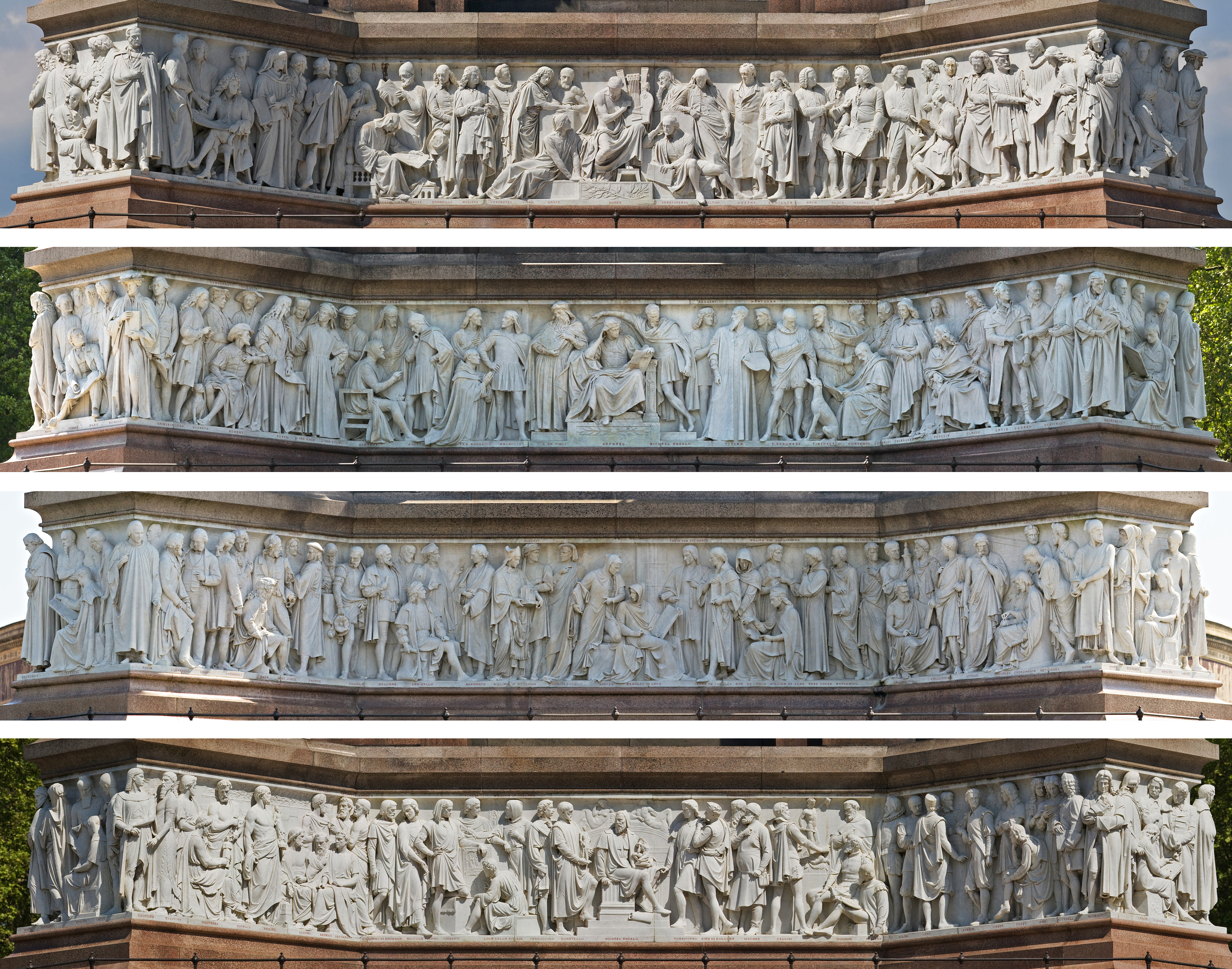
The Frieze of Parnassus encircles the base of the Albert Memorial in London and consists of 169 life-size full-length sculptures of individual artists from history. The total length of the frieze is approximately 64 metres (210 feet). Depicted from top: South side: musicians and poets East side: painters North side: architects West side: sculptors

The Frieze of Parnassus is a large sculpted stone frieze encircling the podium, or base, of the Albert Memorial in London, England. The Albert Memorial was constructed in the 1860s in memory of Prince Albert, the husband of Queen Victoria.

The frieze is named after Mount Parnassus, the favorite resting place in Ancient Greek mythology for the muses. It contains 169 life-size full-length sculptures, a mixture of low-relief and high-relief, of individual composers, architects, poets, painters, and sculptors from history. The depictions of earlier figures necessarily, were imaginary, although many of the figures were based on materials contained in a collection of artworks and drawings gathered for the purpose of ensuring authentic depictions, where this was possible.

The total length of the frieze is approximately 64 metres (210 feet). The frieze was intended to be the 'soul' of the memorial, and the memorial's designer, George Gilbert Scott, stated that he was inspired by the Hémicycle des Beaux Arts by Paul Delaroche. The memorial was not laid out precisely to directions of the compass, however, closely enough that the sides are referred to by direction. Musicians and poets were placed on the south side, with painters on the east side, sculptors on the west side, and architects on the north side.

Henry Hugh Armstead carved the figures on the south and east sides, the painters, musicians, and poets (80 in total), and grouped them by national schools. John Birnie Philip carved the figures on the west and north sides, the sculptors and architects (89 named figures, plus two generic figures), and arranged them in chronological order.

The carving was executed in situ, and was said by Scott to be "perhaps one of the most laborious works of sculpture ever undertaken". The initial contracts, agreed around 1864, had specified that the work was to be completed in four years for £7,781 15s. The eventual cost, however, exceeded this by some £2,000 and the work was not finished until 1872.

Large groups of figures of eminent persons from the past often decorate public buildings and monuments of the later nineteenth century, and some buildings such as the Walhalla temple in Bavaria and the Panthéon in Paris were dedicated to this purpose. Many figures of visual artists decorate the Victoria and Albert Museum close to the Albert Memorial at the other end of the "Albertopolis" complex. A mosaic frieze of more generalised figures from the arts runs round the circular Royal Albert Hall adjacent to the memorial. The Parnassus by Raphael (1511), opposite the philosophers of The School of Athens in the Vatican Raphael Rooms, is an earlier group portrait of great artists.

== List of figures ==
Side	Group	Inscription	Official history	Identification
South	Musicians	AUBER	D. E. F. Auber	Daniel Auber
South	Musicians	MEHUL	E. H. Mehul	Étienne Méhul
South	Musicians	RAMEAU	J. P. Rameau	Jean-Philippe Rameau
South	Musicians	LULLI	J. B. Lulli	Jean-Baptiste Lully
South	Musicians	GRETRY	A. E. M. Gretry	André Ernest Modeste Grétry
South	Musicians	JOSQUIN-DES-PRES	Jasquin Des Pres	Josquin des Prez
South	Musicians	ROSSINI	G. Rossini	Gioachino Rossini
South	Musicians	MONTEVERDE	C. Monteverde	Claudio Monteverdi
South	Musicians	CARISSIMI	G. Carissimi	Giacomo Carissimi
South	Musicians	PALESTRINA	G. P. A. de Palestrina	Giovanni Pierluigi da Palestrina
South	Musicians	GUIDO D'AREZZO	Guido	Guido of Arezzo
South	Musicians	ST AMBROSE	St Ambrose	Ambrose
South	Poets	CORNEILLE	P. Corneille	Pierre Corneille
South	Poets	MOLIERE	Molière	Molière
South	Poets	CERVANTES	Cervantes	Miguel de Cervantes
South	Poets	VIRGIL	Virgil	Virgil
South	Poets	DANTE	Dante	Dante Alighieri
South	Poets	PYTHAGORAS	Pythagoras	Pythagoras
South	Poets	HOMER	Homer	Homer
South	Poets	CHAUCER	G. Chaucer	Geoffrey Chaucer
South	Poets	SHAKESPEARE	W. Shakespeare	William Shakespeare
South	Poets	MILTON	J. Milton	John Milton
South	Poets	GOETHE	Goethe	Johann Wolfgang von Goethe
South	Poets	SCHILLER	Schiller	Friedrich Schiller
South	Musicians	BACH	Bach	Johann Sebastian Bach
South	Musicians	GLUCK	Gluck	Christoph Willibald Gluck
South	Musicians	HANDEL	Handel	George Frideric Handel
South	Musicians	MOZART	Mozart	Wolfgang Amadeus Mozart
South	Musicians	MENDELSSOHN	Mendelssohn	Felix Mendelssohn
South	Musicians	HAYDN	Haydn	Joseph Haydn
South	Musicians	WEBER	Weber	Carl Maria von Weber
South	Musicians	BEETHOVEN	Beethoven	Ludwig van Beethoven
South	Musicians	TALLIS	T. Tallis	Thomas Tallis
South	Musicians	O. GIBBONS	O. Gibbons	Orlando Gibbons
South	Musicians	LAWES	H. Lawes	Henry Lawes
South	Musicians	PURCELL	H. Purcell	Henry Purcell
South	Musicians	ARNE	T. A. Arne	Thomas Arne
South	Musicians	BOYCE	W. Boyce	William Boyce
South	Musicians	BISHOP	Sir H. R. Bishop	Henry Bishop
East	Painters	TURNER	J. M. W. Turner	J. M. W. Turner
East	Painters	WILKIE	Sir D. Wilkie	David Wilkie
East	Painters	REYNOLDS	S. J. Reynolds	Joshua Reynolds
East	Painters	GAINSBOROUGH	T. Gainsborough	Thomas Gainsborough
East	Painters	HOGARTH	W. Hogarth	William Hogarth
East	Painters	REMBRANDT	Rembrandt	Rembrandt
East	Painters	RUBENS	Rubens	Peter Paul Rubens
East	Painters	HOLBEIN	Holbein	Hans Holbein the Younger
East	Painters	DURER	Durer	Albrecht Dürer
East	Painters	H. VAN EYCK	H. and J. Van Eyck	Hubert van Eyck
East	Painters	J. VAN EYCK	H. and J. Van Eyck	Jan van Eyck
East	Painters	STEPHEN OF COLOGNE	S. Lockner	Stefan Lochner
East	Painters	CIMABUE	Cimabue	Cimabue
East	Painters	ORCAGNA	Orcagna	Orcagna
East	Painters	GIOTTO	Giotto	Giotto di Bondone
East	Painters	FRA ANGELICO	Fra Angelico	Fra Angelico
East	Painters	GHIRLANDAJO	Ghirlandajo	Domenico Ghirlandaio
East	Painters	MASACCIO	Masaccio	Masaccio
East	Painters	L. DA VINCI	L. Da Vinci	Leonardo da Vinci
East	Painters	RAPHAEL	Raphael	Raphael
East	Painters	MICHAEL ANGELO	M. Angelo	Michelangelo
East	Painters	BELLINI	Bellini	Giovanni Bellini
East	Painters	TITIAN	Titian	Titian
East	Painters	MANTEGNA	Mantegna	Andrea Mantegna
East	Painters	P. VERONESE	P. Veronese	Paolo Veronese
East	Painters	TINTORETTO	Tintoretto	Tintoretto
East	Painters	COREGGIO	Coreggio	Antonio da Correggio
East	Painters	AN. CARACCI	A. Caracci	Annibale Carracci
East	Painters	L. CARACCI	L. Carraci	Ludovico Carracci
East	Painters	VELASQUEZ	Velasquez	Diego Velázquez
East	Painters	MURILLO	Murillo	Bartolomé Esteban Murillo
East	Painters	POUSSIN	Poussin	Nicolas Poussin
East	Painters	CLAUDE	Claude	Claude Lorrain
East	Painters	DAVID	J. L. David	Jacques-Louis David
East	Painters	GERARD	Gerard	François Gérard
East	Painters	GERICAULT	Gerecault	Théodore Géricault
East	Painters	DELACROIX	Delacroix	Eugène Delacroix
East	Painters	VERNET	Vernet	Claude Joseph Vernet
East	Painters	DELAROCHE	Delaroche	Hippolyte Delaroche
East	Painters	INGRES	Ingres	Jean Auguste Dominique Ingres
East	Painters	DECAMPS	Decamps	Alexandre-Gabriel Decamps
North	Architects	PUGIN	Pugin	Augustus Welby Northmore Pugin
North	Architects	SCOTT	Scott	George Gilbert Scott
North	Architects	COCKERELL	Cockerell	Samuel Pepys Cockerell
North	Architects	BARRY	Barry	Charles Barry
North	Architects	CHAMBERS	Chambers	Sir William Chambers
North	Architects	VANBRUGH	Vanbrugh	John Vanbrugh
North	Architects	WREN	Wren	Christopher Wren
North	Architects	INIGO JONES	Inigo Jones	Inigo Jones
North	Architects	MANSART	Mansart	Jules Hardouin Mansart
North	Architects	THORPE	Thorpe	John Thorpe
North	Architects	PALLADIO	Palladio	Andrea Palladio
North	Architects	VIGNOLA	Vignola	Giacomo Barozzi da Vignola
North	Architects	DELORME	Delorme	Philibert de l'Orme
North	Architects	SANSOVINO	Sansovino	Jacopo Sansovino
North	Architects	SAN GALLO	San Gallo	Giuliano da Sangallo
North	Architects	PERUZZI	Peruzzi	Baldassare Peruzzi
North	Architects	BRAMANTE	Bramante	Donato Bramante
North	Architects	WILLIAM OF WYKEHAM	William of Wykeham	William of Wykeham
North	Architects	ALBERTI	Alberti	Leone Battista Alberti
North	Architects	BRUNELLESCHI	Brunelleschi	Filippo Brunelleschi
North	Architects	GIOTTO	Giotto	Giotto di Bondone
North	Architects	ARNOLFO DI LAPO	Arndfo Di Lapo	Arnolfo di Cambio
North	Architects	ERWIN VON STEINBACH	Ermin Van Steinbach	Erwin von Steinbach
North	Architects	JEHAN DE CHELLES	Johan de Chelles	Jean de Chelles
North	Architects	ROB DE COUCY	R. de Courcy	Robert De Coucy
North	Architects	WILLIAM OF SENS	William of Sens	William of Sens
North	Architects	WILLIAM THE ENGLISHMAN	William the Englishman	William the Englishman
North	Architects	ABBE SUGER	Abbe Suger	Abbot Suger
North	Architects	ANTHEMIUS	Anthemius	Anthemius of Tralles
North	Architects	HERMODORUS	Hermodoraus	no article
North	Architects	APOLLODORUS	Appollodonus	Apollodorus of Damascus
North	Architects	CALLIMACHUS	Callimchus	Callimachus
North	Architects	LIBON	Libon	Libon
North	Architects	CALLICRATES	Callicrates	Kallikrates
North	Architects	ICTINUS	Ictinus	Iktinos
North	Architects	MNESIKLES	Mnesicles	Mnesikles
North	Architects	CHERSIPHRON	Chersiphron	Chersiphron
North	Architects	RHOECUS	Rhoscus	Rhoecus
North	Architects	METAGENES	Metagenes	Metagenes
North	Architects	THEODORUS	Theodorus	Theodorus of Samos
North	Architects	HIRAM	Hiram	Hiram Abiff
North	Architects	BEZALEEL	Bezaleel	Bezalel
North	Architects	SENNACHERIB	Sennacherib	Sennacherib
North	Architects	NITOCRIS	Nitocris	Nitocris
North	Architects	CHEOPS	Cheops	Khufu
West	Sculptors	EGYPTIAN	Egyptian	none
West	Sculptors	ASSYRIAN	Assyrian	none
West	Sculptors	RHOECUS	R. Loecus	Rhoecus
West	Sculptors	DIBUTADES	Dibutades	Butades
West	Sculptors	BUPALUS	Bupalus	Bupalus
West	Sculptors	PHIDIAS	Phidias	Phidias
West	Sculptors	SCOPAS	Scopas	Scopas
West	Sculptors	BRYAXIS	Bryaxis	Bryaxis
West	Sculptors	LEOCHARES	Leochanes	Leochares
West	Sculptors	PRAXITELES	Praxiteles	Praxiteles
West	Sculptors	LYSIPPUS	Lysippus	Lysippos
West	Sculptors	CHARES	Chanes	Chares of Lindos
West	Sculptors	GIULIANO DI RAVENNA	Giuliano de Ravenna	no article
West	Sculptors	NICCOLA PISANO	Niccola Pisano	Nicola Pisano
West	Sculptors	GHIBERTI	Ghiberti	Lorenzo Ghiberti
West	Sculptors	TORELL	W. Tonel	William Torell
West	Sculptors	LUCA DELLA ROBBIA	Luca Deklla Robbia	Luca della Robbia
West	Sculptors	WILLIAM OF IRELAND	William of Ireland	William of Ireland
West	Sculptors	VERROCCHIO	Verrocchio	Andrea del Verrocchio
West	Sculptors	DONATELLO	Donatello	Donatello
West	Sculptors	MICHAEL ANGELO	Michael Angelo	Michelangelo
West	Sculptors	TORRIGIANO	Torrigiano	Pietro Torrigiano
West	Sculptors	GIAN DI BOLOGNA	Gian Di Balogna	Giambologna
West	Sculptors	BANDINELLI	Bandinelli	Bartolommeo Bandinelli
West	Sculptors	VISCHER	Vischer	Peter Vischer the Elder
West	Sculptors	CELLINI	Cellini	Benvenuto Cellini
West	Sculptors	BACCIO D'AGNOLO	Baccio D'agnelo	Baccio D'Agnolo
West	Sculptors	GOUJON	Gaujon	Jean Goujon
West	Sculptors	PALISSY	Palisay	Bernard Palissy
West	Sculptors	BONTEMPS	Bontemps	Pierre Bontemps
West	Sculptors	PILON	Pilon	Germain Pilon
West	Sculptors	CANO	Cano	Alonso Cano
West	Sculptors	STONE	Stone	Nicholas Stone
West	Sculptors	BERNINI	Bernini	Gian Lorenzo Bernini
West	Sculptors	CIBBER	Cibber	Caius Gabriel Cibber
West	Sculptors	PUGET	Puget	Pierre Paul Puget
West	Sculptors	GIBBONS	Gibbons	Grinling Gibbons
West	Sculptors	BIRD	F. Bird	Francis Bird
West	Sculptors	BUSHNELL	Bushnell	John Bushnell
West	Sculptors	ROUBILIAC	Roubiliac	Louis-François Roubiliac
West	Sculptors	CANOVA	Canova	Antonio Canova
West	Sculptors	FLAXMAN	Flaxman	John Flaxman
West	Sculptors	DAVID (ANGERS)	David D'Angers	Pierre Jean David
West	Sculptors	THORWALDSEN	Thorvaldsen	Bertel Thorvaldsen

== Selection, arrangement, and omissions ==
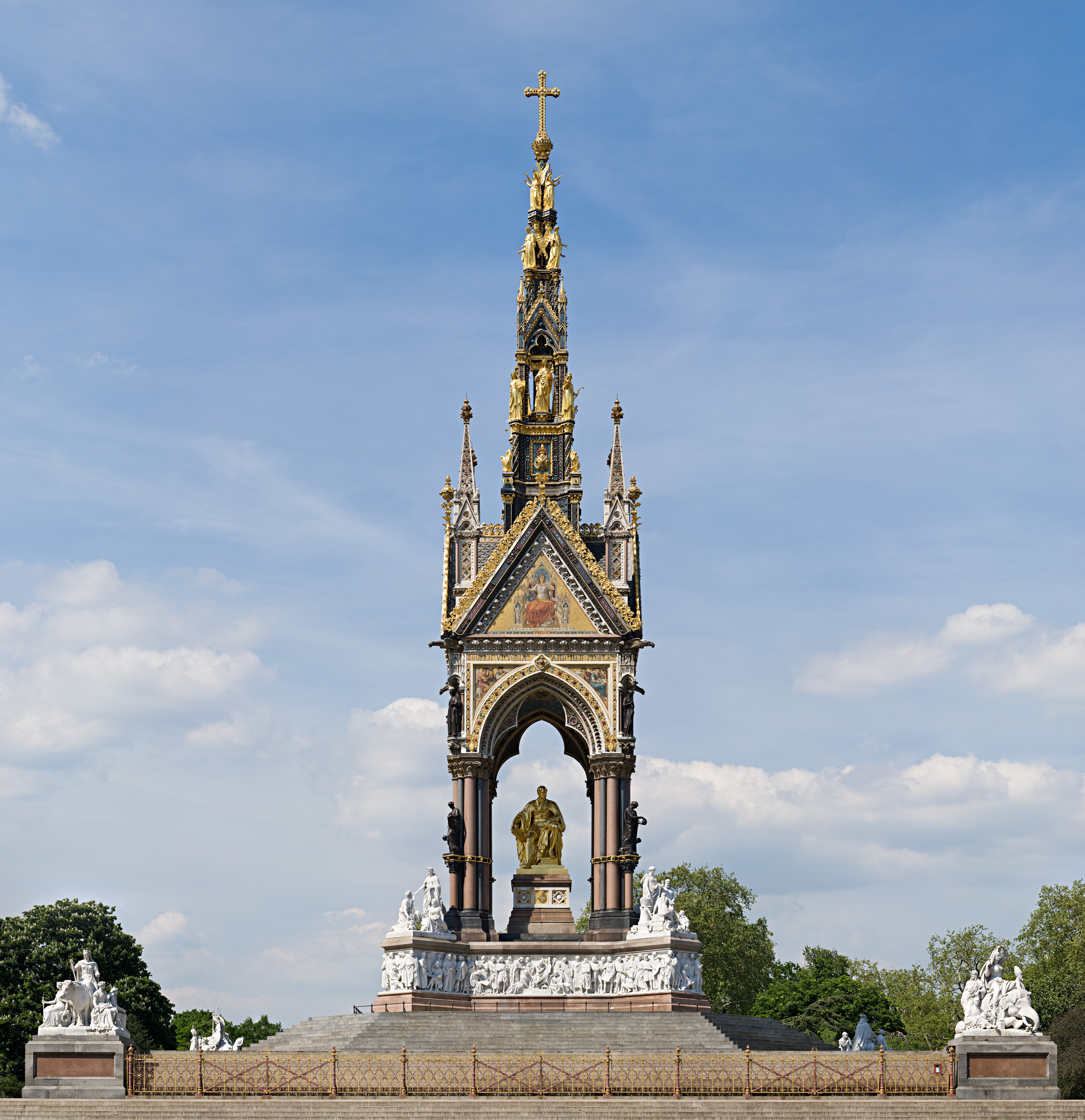
The frieze in its context; the Albert Memorial as seen from the south side

The selection of figures reflects contemporary thinking, although even by the taste of the 1860s it seems odd to omit Schubert, then considered rather lightweight, whilst including Daniel Auber and Grétry.

Among the painters, a classical tradition predominates to the extent that there is no hint of Mannerism in the sixteenth century and Giulio Romano is omitted, nor is there any reference to Rococo taste, where a modern list would include Antoine Watteau and François Boucher. The painters represented in the frieze reflect to some extent, Albert's own taste for the "Primitives" of the late Middle Ages, although Duccio is absent. Botticelli and Vermeer were yet to be rediscovered, and El Greco, Caravaggio and Goya, who would all figure in a modern canon, mostly were regarded with suspicion.

No English poet after John Milton was featured. Among the architects, the figure of Nitocris, the only figure representing a woman on the frieze, may have been selected because it was at one time thought that she was the pharaoh responsible for the pyramid now credited to Menkaura.

Other figures commemorated elsewhere on the Albert Memorial, on the canopy mosaics, but not on the frieze, are Apelles (painting), King Solomon (architecture) and King David (poetry). The preferred south side of the memorial, being the direction in which Albert's statue faces, is populated by poets and musicians, with poets at the centre in accordance with the Victorian concept of poetry as the highest of the arts.

The arrangement of the other groups also reflects this Victorian thinking, with the fine arts of the sculptors and painters on the east and west sides, joining a spiritual side on the south (the poets and musicians) and a material side on the north (the architects). At least three of the sides also have a central, pre-eminent figure seated on a throne, with Homer for the poets, Raphael for the painters, and Michelangelo for the sculptors.

Scott originally intended the last of the architects depicted in full to be himself, however, after all the other characters had been chosen, he realised he'd forgotten Pugin, the great genius of the Victorian Gothic Revival. So Scott replaced his own statue with Pugin's, and then placed himself as a relief head, looking over Pugin's shoulder.

== Authenticity and details ==
Authentic points of detail and historical accuracy include Phidias being depicted as bald, the phorminx (lyre) being held by the bard Homer, William Hogarth's dog, Paolo Veronese's hand resting on a greyhound, Daniel Auber's right arm in a sling, the building models held by William of Wykeham and Jean de Chelles, the model of Trajan's Column held by Apollodorus of Damascus, the object held by Hiram, the sculptures held by Dibutades and Phidias, Ghiberti leaning on a panel, the sculptures being held by Donatello and Michelangelo, and the statue being admired by the group to the right of Cellini.

Authentic period detail also is seen in much of the clothing, the details of facial hair, furniture, and accessories, including scrolls, books, swords, and palettes. The figures are posed, either in isolation or in groups, with some figures facing each other in poses of admiration or engaged deeply in conversation.
