= Richard Burchett =

British artist (1815–1875)

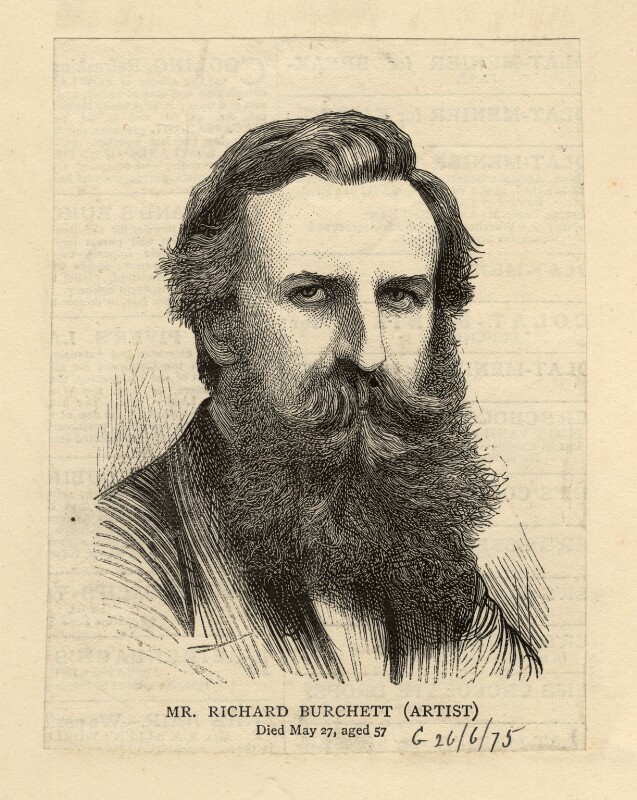
Posthumous portrait, 1875

Richard Burchett (1815 – 27 May 1875) was a British artist and educator on the fringes of the Pre-Raphaelite movement, who was for over twenty years the Headmaster of what later became the Royal College of Art.

He was later described as "a prominent figure in the art-schools, a well-instructed painter, and a teacher exceptionally equipped with all the learning of his craft" by his ex-pupil, the poet Austin Dobson. Burchett's pupils included the extremely varied talents of Kate Greenaway, Christopher Dresser, Elizabeth Thompson (Lady Butler), Sir George Clausen, Sir Luke Fildes, Gertrude Jekyll, Hubert von Herkomer, Evelyn De Morgan, William Harbutt, Henrietta Montalba, and Helen Allingham. Princess Louise, Duchess of Argyll, Queen Victoria's daughter, and a talented artist, was also a student. Thompson described her headmaster as a "bearded, velvet-skull-capped and cold-searching-eyed man".

As an artist he achieved some reputation for large history paintings, and decorated public buildings including parts of the Palace of Westminster and the Victoria and Albert Museum, but his View across Sandown Bay, Isle of Wight is seen by modern art historians as his best work. Burchett published collections of his lectures as text-books for the South Kensington system of art education, which he helped to devise.

== Life ==
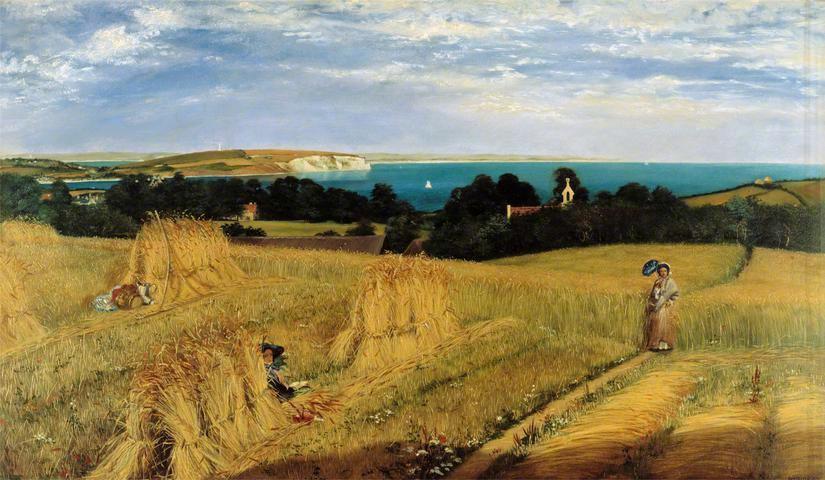
View across Sandown Bay, Isle of Wight probably of 1855, Victoria and Albert Museum.

Burchett was born in Brighton on 30 January 1815. He attended the "London Mechanics Institute" in Chancery Lane (founded 1823, the forerunner of Birkbeck College, University of London), before in about 1841 entering the "Government School of Design", founded three years before in 1837, which he was later to head, and which eventually became the Royal College of Art. In 1845 he was a ringleader of students protesting to the Board of Trade about the teaching methods, in what was at the time a controversy that attracted a great deal of public attention, and finally a Parliamentary Committee of Enquiry. He gave evidence to this in 1846-7, by which time he had become a master at the school (the "Master of Form", from 1845), remaining on the staff until his death in 1875, from 1852 as Headmaster.

Burchett spent most of his time throughout his adult life on his work at the school, and that his most highly regarded work today is an atypical landscape subject is an indication of how much his personal painting was neglected for teaching, and public commissions through the school. According to the Memoirs of William Bell Scott, who had worked under him, Burchett was: "an able, self-dependent actor in the affairs of life, yet one whose action was rarely to his own benefit, although largely to the benefit of those under him in his official position".

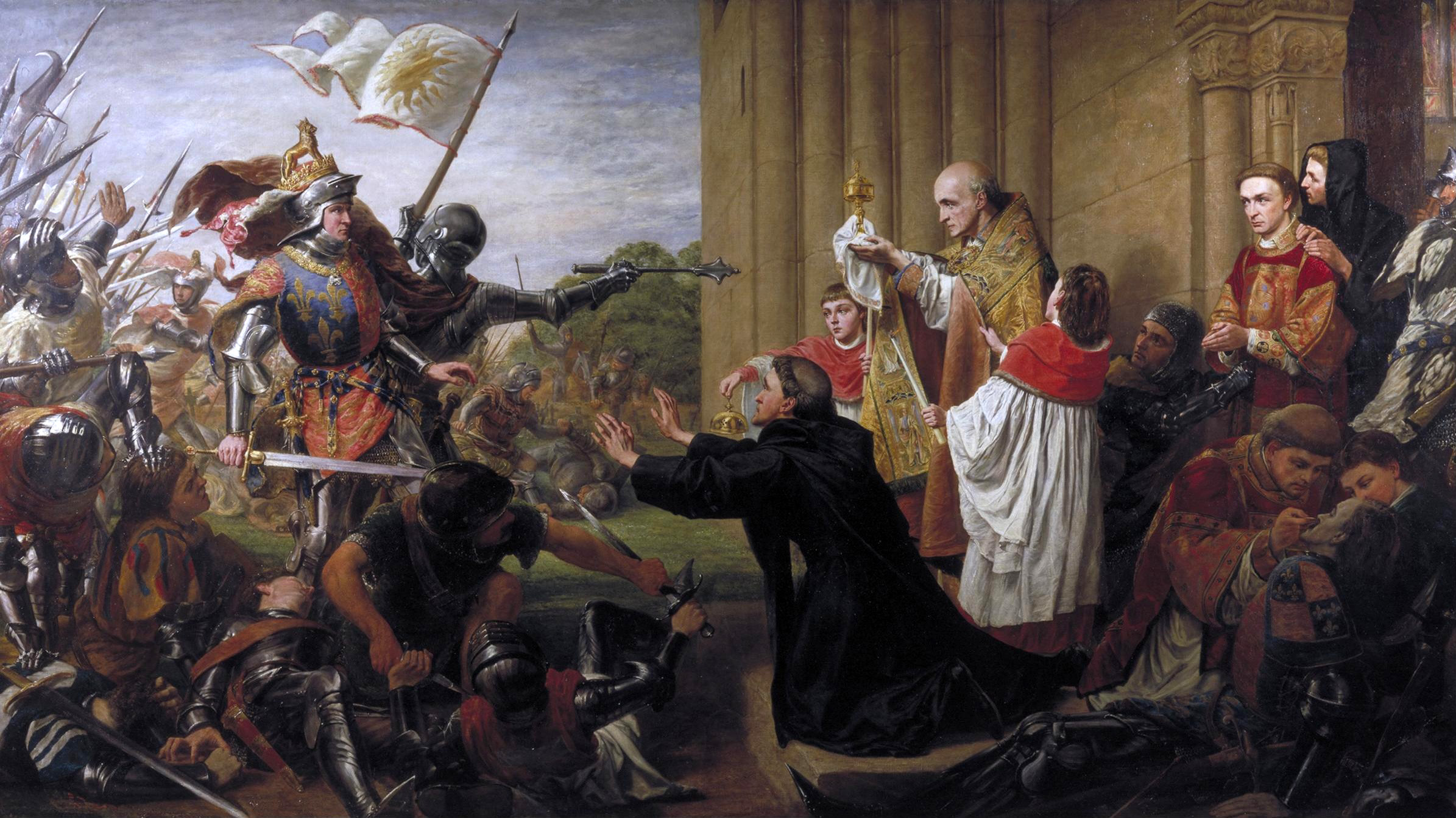
Sanctuary, or Edward IV Withheld by Ecclesiastics from Pursuing Lancastrian Fugitives into a Church, 1867, Guildhall Art Gallery. Depicting the aftermath of the Battle of Tewkesbury in the Wars of the Roses, one of the large history paintings with which Burchett hoped to make his reputation

In the mid-1850s, Burchett converted to Roman Catholicism; it is presumed that he was influenced by the already-converted Pre-Raphaelite James Collinson, with whom he was living after Collinson's engagement to Christina Rossetti had broken down for the second time. He married twice, and had several children. What appear to be a son and grandson are recorded exhibiting paintings in London. Ebenezer Stanley Burchett (1837–1916) worked at South Kensington and then was Head Master of the Bedford Park School of Arts & Crafts. In 1870 Richard Burchett is described as "formerly of 43 Brompton Square [very near the School], but now of 8 Bedford Road, Clapham." Burchett was in very bad health for the last years of his life, and when he died in Dublin, on 27 May 1875, he was staying with his wife's uncle, Sir Samuel Ferguson, for his health. He had only been in the School for 133 days in 1872, arriving punctually on only seven of these.

In 1870, he began proceedings for bankruptcy, which were still not concluded by his death. Scott says he "took to a sort of farming at considerable expense ... He began to get into deep water, and into the hands of 20 per cent money-lenders. Still he fought bravely with his difficulties, and even when his large salary was placed under trustees, he went on with his historic subjects". His venture was ill-timed, hitting a period of agricultural depression. A series of twelve dividends to his creditors, between 1871 and September 1876, paid off at least 7s 7 3/4d in the pound - dividends number 1, 7 & 8 seem not to appear in the London Gazette search results. His will was probated at less than £200, and Frayling records that a letter from his widow asking for a pension was found unanswered in the school files thirteen years later. Obituaries were published in the Athenaeum, the Art Journal, and The Graphic.

== Artist ==
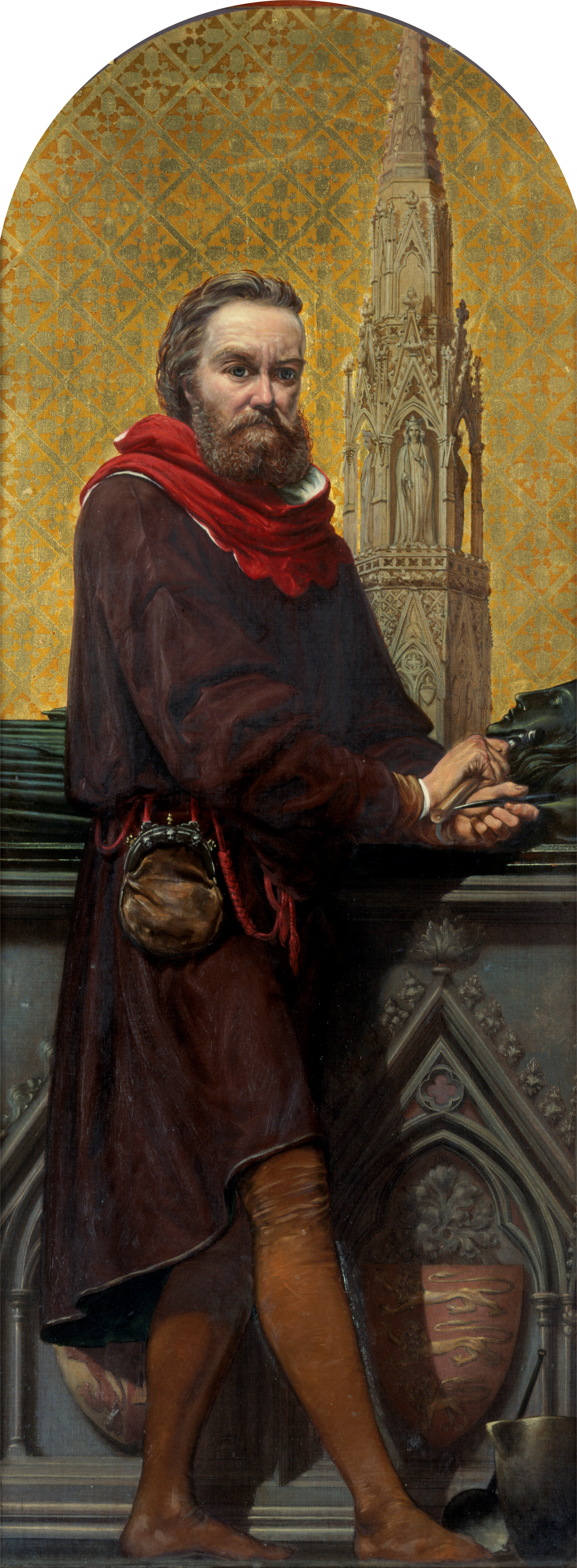
William Torrel (1291–1303), design for a mosaic in the Victoria and Albert Museum, now also on display there

Burchett exhibited five works, apparently all large history paintings, at the Royal Academy between 1847, including The Death of Marmion, "famous in its day" according to Hugh Thomas) and 1873 (The Making of the New Forest). These are rather generously described as "in the Pre-Raphaelite style" by the DNB. He exhibited a work at the British Institution in 1855. His best-known work in this genre is Sanctuary (RA, 1867), the snappy modern title for Edward IV Withheld by Ecclesiastics from Pursuing Lancastrian Fugitives into a Church, in the Guildhall Art Gallery, London, showing an incident after the Battle of Tewkesbury of 1471, during the Wars of the Roses.

William Bell Scott has an anecdote of Burchett, who "had chosen the subject as a glorious example of the power of the Church and the faith of the prince at that blessed period in Merry England" failing to sell the painting to an "extreme Radical" shipping magnate: ""I admire the picture, Mr. Burchett, it is excellently painted, and I like it for its subject; these men in full armour won't go in, they won't end the day completely after risking all their lives, because of that old priest with the jack-in-the-box! Superstition, you see, turns them into caitiffs!" This knocked over poor Burchett so much, the transaction came to nothing" Scott comments that Burchett: "gave himself up to historical painting on a rather large scale, just the kind of art which English taste and the R. Academy as the mediocre exponent of the same would like to crush out of existence".

However the work which has attracted the most attention and praise from critics in recent decades is what appears to be his "only known landscape", View across Sandown Bay, Isle of Wight probably of 1855, in the Victoria and Albert Museum, who describe it as a "minor masterpiece". This small painting, which more closely approaches a Pre-Raphaelite landscape style, shows a half-harvested cornfield, with tools and jugs of the farm-workers piled up beside a corn stook. But the only figures visible are two clearly middle-class women, no doubt part of the same party as the artist, one sitting against a stook reading a book, and the other walking with a parasol. Any georgic or realist focus on agriculture is absent "his cornfield is just part of a landscape where middle-class people take their leisure. The corn is no more or no less useful than the beaches which we imagine to be in the distance of this brilliantly coloured painting". Here too a more subtle hint of religious feeling is found: "the church in the distance hints at the source of the bounty represented by the partially garnered harvest in the foreground fields". Treatments of the almost identical view by William Dyce and James Collinson (Mother and Child, Mellon Centre, Yale), both Burchett's colleagues at the school, are taken by Geoffrey Grigson to mean that the three artists were on a visit, or holiday, together. Dyce, like Burchett, was an artist who saw himself as a history painter but is now most often remembered for a single Pre-Raphaelitish landscape, his Pegwell Bay, Kent – a Recollection of October 5th 1858.

There are a number of public paintings by Burchett, with help of his students, commissioned through the school. He and his students painted, from Renaissance portraits, a number of full-length portraits of the House of Tudor for the royal antechamber to the House of Lords in the Palace of Westminster (1855-9). He painted other works for the new Palace, including a large Spanish Armada scene The English Fleet Pursuing the Spanish Fleet Against Fowey, copying from an 18th-century print a one of a set of tapestries made for Lord Howard of Effingham, the victorious admiral. The death of Prince Albert brought the project to reproduce the full set to an end, but it was revived in the 21st century, and finally completed in 2010. Like the works in the Palace by better-known painters like Dyce, these have been generally disliked by critics from their first unveiling; the overall painting of the Palace after its rebuilding was probably the largest public painting commission in England during the 19th century, and, unlike the architecture of the Palace, has been regarded as very disappointing by most critics from the start.

From a number of designs for mosaics for the exteriors to the south court of the Victoria and Albert Museum he produced William Torrell (two versions in fact) and William of Wykeham. The mosaics remain in place, and two of the cartoons are now themselves on display in the staircase on the Exhibition Road side of the building. He and his students decorated large medallions in the dome of the now-vanished Great Exhibition building of 1862 at South Kensington, and he painted a window in the Greenwich Hospital.

== The South Kensington system ==
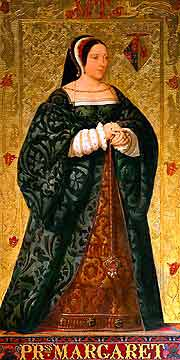
Margaret Tudor, Queen of Scots, Houses of Parliament

The controversy at the school in 1845 was about the Headmaster and his teaching methods, but reflected wider issues about the aims of the school in terms of the balance between fine art and applied and commercial art and design; these questions were to remain a perennial bone of contention for at least another century, and are a recurring theme in Christopher Frayling's 1987 history of the College. The new teaching methods implemented by Burchett were themselves to become a matter of controversy.

The school had been founded in 1837, as the Government School of Design, occupying part of Somerset House on the Strand, until the space was needed for the Register of Births, Deaths and Marriages. It became the National Art Training School in 1853, moving to the equally palatial setting of Marlborough House, thanks to Prince Albert, leaving a section just for training art teachers on the Strand, and establishing a separate "Female School" in Gower St, from 1861 Queen Square, Bloomsbury. In 1861 the main school moved again to buildings adjoining (and now absorbed by) the Victoria and Albert Museum in South Kensington, and long after Burchett's death it became in 1896 The Royal College of Art. It is often referred to as the "Government Art School", and later the "South Kensington Schools", in the 19th century (the school was at various points divided into different sections, such as the "Female School", also under Burchett, and there were also science schools run by the Science and Art Department, hence the plural).

The main art school in London was the Royal Academy Schools, which made space for the new school by its decision to vacate Somerset House for the new National Gallery building, where it stayed until 1867. They had been established decades before the Government School, to provide a full training in Academic art; by the 1830s the majority of successful English artists had trained there. The Government School was funded by the Board of Trade, and intended, at least by them, for different purposes, though precisely what these were remained a political battleground for decades. The school was not founded to train academic painters; this at least was clear, although in fact many ex-students became just that. The Government had recognised that British industrial design was falling behind that of the Continent, and believed that the training of designers was worth public subsidy. Later, a national network of schools to train students in applied art and design was established, and the central London school was both to be the flagship of the network, and to train teachers for the rest of the schools.

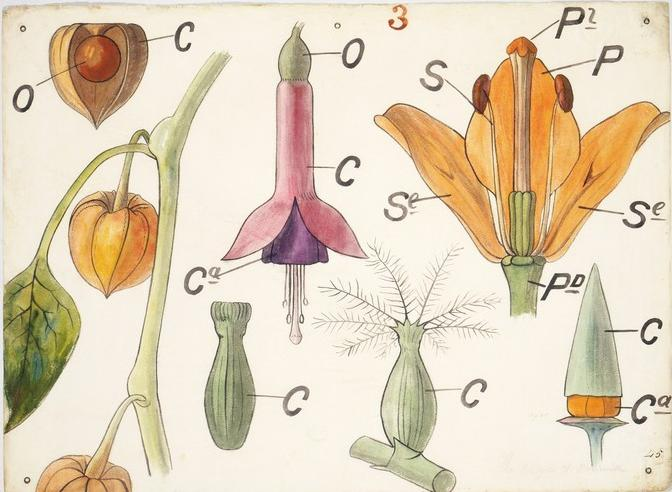
Botany Diagram, about 1855 by Christopher Dresser to illustrate his teaching at the school, V&A Museum.

William Dyce was the first Director, and Burchett studied under him, and then worked with him as a colleague, until Dyce left in 1848. The Isle of Wight paintings from 1855 suggest the two remained friends.

After the internal disputes of the 1840s, the school acquired a firm sense of control and direction when in 1853 the Government placed it under the control of Henry Cole, for whom the Science and Art Department was set up, with a large tract of land, and much of the large profit from the 1852 Great Exhibition to spend. Cole was an extremely dynamic figure, with some training as a painter, and experience as an entrepreneurial designer of china. He made the young painter Richard Redgrave, master of botany at the school since 1847, responsible for the superintendence of the national system, and appointed Burchett as Headmaster of the London School.

Redgrave, drawing on Dyce's ideas, and propelled by Cole, set out the "South Kensington system", a highly specific syllabus for the teaching of art, which was to be dominant in the UK, and other English-speaking countries, at least until the end of the century, and not to entirely vanish until the 1930s. Burchett was the first to implement the course in London, and worked with Redgrave in drawing it up - Redgrave had much less teaching experience. Burchett's published lectures reflected the system, and were widely used as text-books for it; how far he was involved in devising it cannot be said.

The full course was divided into twenty-three stages, most with several sections. Different types of students were to take different combinations of stages: "machinists, engineers and foremen of works" should take stages 1–5, and then skip to the final 23rd stage, "Technical Studies", while designers and "ornamentalists" took most stages.

There were several types of students, pursuing different courses: the "general students", who paid no fees and were given a small living allowance, training to be teachers of art (though many ended up elsewhere), the "National Scholars" intended for industrial designers, and fee-paying students, pursuing a course more oriented to the fine arts. Latterly these were in fact the majority. Women pupils were taught at least partly separately, and their life classes consisted of drawing a man wearing a suit of armour. The Royal Academy Schools did not accept women students until 1861, although there were other alternatives for women. The female school, under Royal patronage, became a rather fashionable place for young ladies, able to support its expansion by society fundraising.

== Author and collector ==
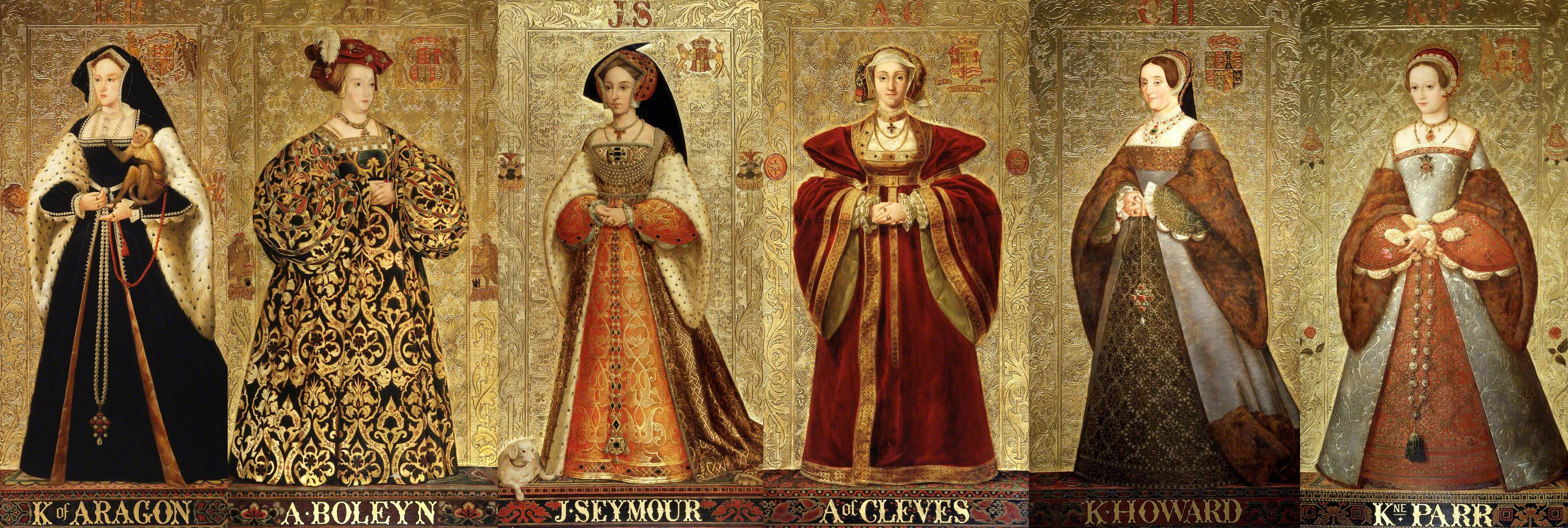
The Six Wives of Henry VIII, by Burchett and his students, 1854–1860, Houses of Parliament.

Collections of Burchett's lectures from the school were published in book form, through Chapman and Hall: Practical Geometry (1855), Practical Perspective (1857), which was translated into Chinese, Linear Perspective for the Use of Schools of Art (1872).

He appears buying a number of lots for the school ("Marlborough House") and a few for himself in the huge (4294 lot) sale in 1855 of the distinguished collection of Ralph Bernal. He was also at the studio sale of Augustus Egg, buying two paintings now in the Victoria and Albert Museum, probably on their behalf, although he also sold them works apparently from his collection, as well as his Sandown landscape (in 1861).

Burchett looked after a number of paintings by his colleague, the Pre-Raphaelite Walter Howell Deverell (1827–54) for a decade after Deverell's early death, before handing them on to Dante Gabriel Rossetti. These included Twelfth Night, Deverell's major work, which fetched £600,650 ($957,436) in an auction at Christie's in 2003. He must have known Deverell as a boy, as his father had been Secretary to the school, and the family lived on the premises until 1852. Deverell joined the staff of the school in 1848, and was there until his death.

Apart from his own students, Burchett encouraged other young artists, sending the Royal Academy Schools a letter of recommendation for the young Albert Moore.

== Portraits ==
Portraits of the heavily-bearded Burchett include a marble bust by his pupil Henrietta Montalba in an elaborate pink alabaster frame designed by George Clausen that has followed the Royal College to its new Darwin Building on Kensington Gore, where it is installed in a courtyard. He was painted by Val Prinsep standing next to Lord Leighton in his Distribution of Art Prizes (1869, Victoria and Albert Museum), and there is a wood engraving after an unknown artist, very likely a student (above) published with an obituary. His necessarily imagined "portrait" of the medieval metalworker William Torrell for the Victoria & Albert Museum mosaics (above) shows considerable similarity to his other portraits, and may be a self-portrait.

== Main references ==
- Dictionary of National Biography, online, "Richard Burchett", by Anne Pimlott Baker, accessed Feb 13, 2008.("DNB")
- Frayling, Christopher: The Royal College of Art, One Hundred and Fifty Years of Art and Design, 1987, Barrie & Jenkins, London, ISBN 0-7126-1820-1
- MacDonald, Stuart, The History and Philosophy of Art Education, 2004, James Clarke & Co.,ISBN 0-7188-9153-8
- Parkinson, Ronald: Victoria and Albert Museum, Catalogue of British Oil Paintings, 1820–1860, 1990, HMSO, ISBN 0-11-290463-7, ("V&A")
- Rosenthal, Michael: British Landscape Painting, 1982, Phaidon Press, London
- Scott, William Bell, Autobiographical notes of the life of William Bell Scott, and notices of his artistic and poetic circle of friends, 1830 to 1882, Volume II, ed. W Minto, 1892, New York edition, online text
