= William the Englishman =

English architect and stonemason

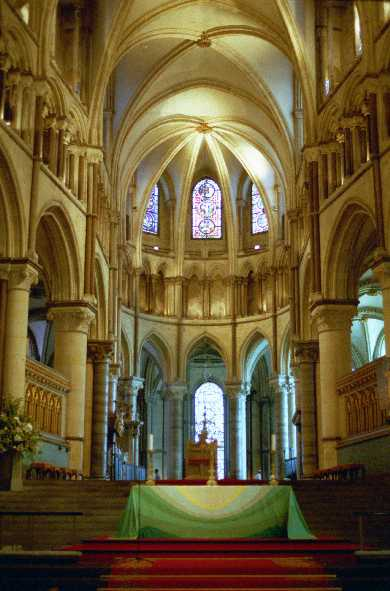
The east end of Canterbury Cathedral, Designed by William

William the Englishman (active from 1174, died circa 1214) was an English architect and stonemason. He completed the work done on Canterbury Cathedral in England by the French architect William of Sens, after the latter was badly injured in a fall from scaffolding on the cathedral.

He is commemorated on the Albert Memorial in London as part of the Frieze of Parnassus, a pantheon of great architects and artists from history.
