= William Torell =

English sculptor

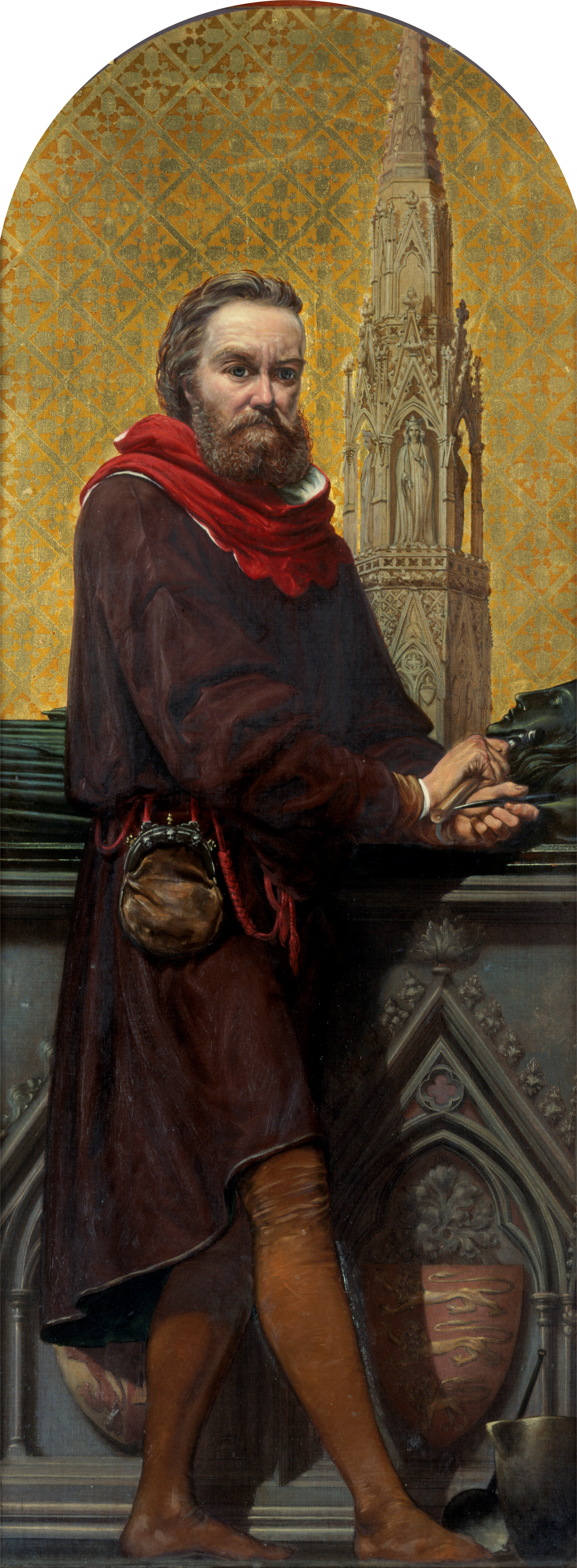
William Torrel, depicted in a design for a mosaic in the Victoria and Albert Museum by Richard Burchett

William Torell, also spelled Torel, Torrel, Torrell, Toral etc., was an English sculptor during the late 13th century. Torell was from a notable family of London goldsmiths, and was responsible for the very fine gilded brass funeral effigies of Henry III of England and his son's queen Eleanor of Castile in Westminster Abbey (1291–93); the idealised recumbent figures are set within a tomb of Cosmati work by immigrant craftsmen. They were the first English metal sculptures on such a scale.

He was found in 1303 to have bought in good faith two ruby rings from the great theft of treasure from Westminster Abbey. His known period of activity is begun by the Westminster monuments and ended by this incident, though clearly he would have been a mature artist at the top of his field to receive the royal commissions.

Speculation in the 19th century that the family might be Italians, presumably called "Torelli", has no supporting evidence; it is more likely to be a version of the Anglo-Danish "Thorold" or "Torald", mostly found in the north of England, though there were landowning Torels, perhaps the same family, in Essex and Somerset; there would be nothing unusual in successful London goldsmiths having country estates at this period.

In the mid-nineteenth century Torell's reputation was high enough, and the numbers of named English medieval artists low enough, that he was included among the sculptors in the Frieze of Parnassus on the Albert Memorial in London, as well given both a statue on the Exhibition Road facade of the Victoria and Albert Museum, and a full-length mosaic portrait by Richard Burchett on the exterior walls to the south court. The mosaics remain in place, and one of Burchett's two different painted studies of Torell is also now on display in the staircase on the Exhibition Road side of the building.
