= Ellen Montalba =

British artist

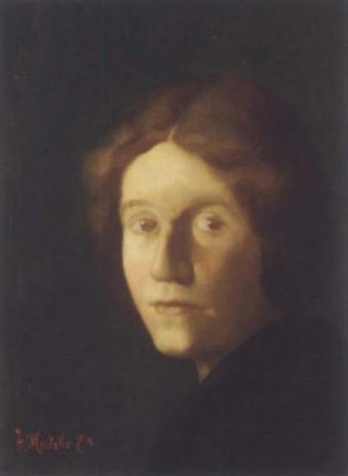
- Self Portrait by Ellen Montalba, 1885
- Born: Ellen Emeline Montalba; 17 February 1842; Bath, England
- Died: 22 February 1930 (aged 88); Venice, Italy
- Known for: Painter

Ellen Emeline Montalba (17 February 1842 – 22 February 1930) was a British artist. She was born in Bath, England, one of four daughters of the Swedish-born artist Anthony Rubens Montalba and Emeline (née Davies). She and her three sisters all attained high repute as artists. The 1871 British census shows Anthony Montalba living at 19 Arundel Gardens, Notting Hill, in London, with four daughters, all artists.

The Montalba sisters were regular contributors to the Royal Academy Summer Exhibition during the 1870s. Ellen studied at the South Kensington Schools, which later became the Royal College of Art, and in Europe, being based in Venice along with her family. She painted portraits, figure studies and landscapes including life-size portraits. Among the portraits she exhibited was one of her sister Clara and also one of the Princess Louise. She exhibited her work at the Woman's Building at the 1893 World's Columbian Exposition in Chicago, Illinois.

Ellen Emeline Montalba died on 22 February 1930, aged 88, at the Montalba family home, Palazzo Trevisan on the Campo S. Agnese in Venice. Her cremated remains were interred in the Protestant Section of Cimitero di San Michele, Venice, Italy.

== See also ==
- Henrietta Montalba
- Hilda Montalba
