= Arundel Gardens =

Street in London

Coordinates: 51.5137°N 0.2059°W

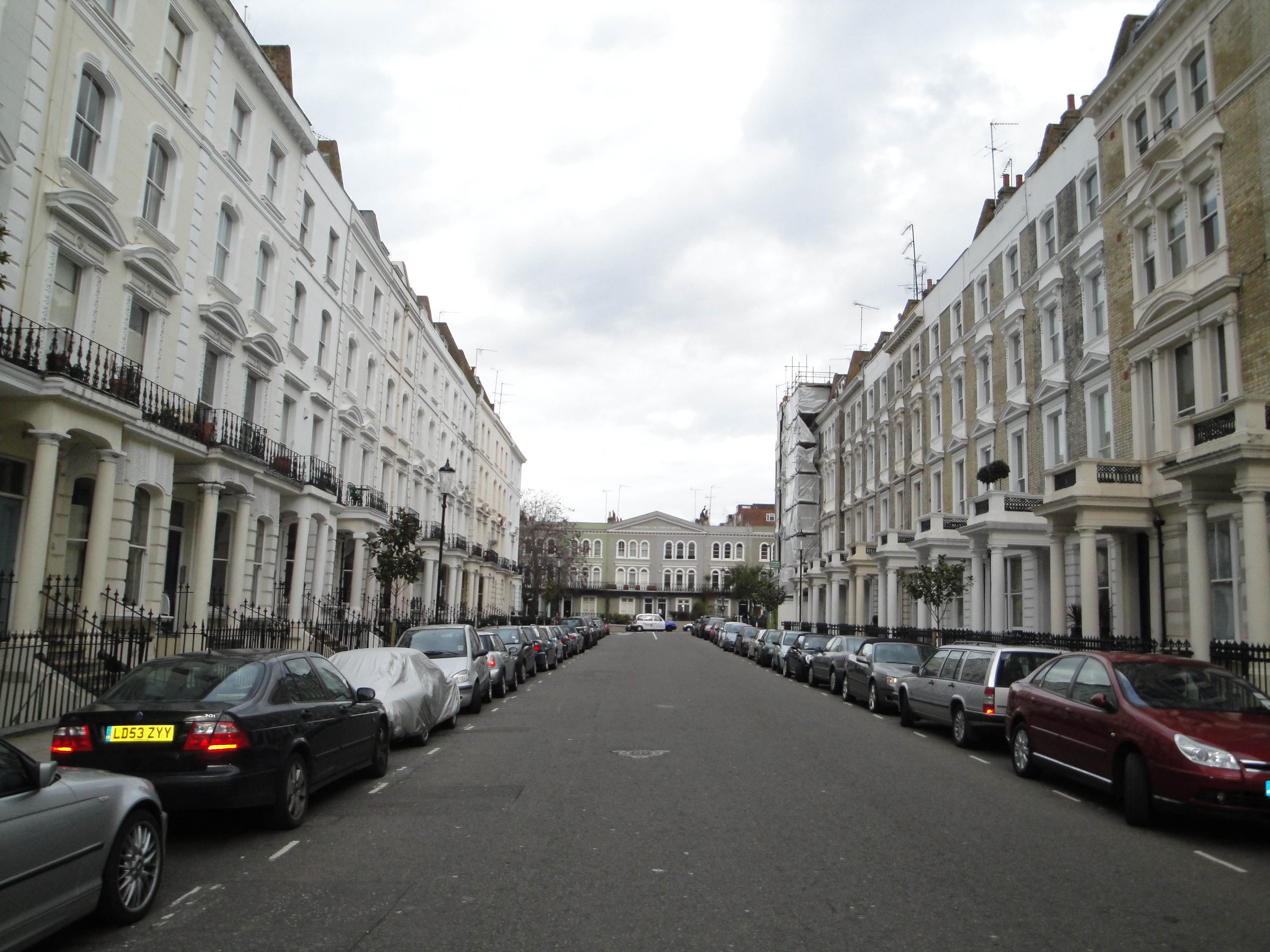
- Arundel Gardens
- Length: 0.1 mi (0.16 km)
- Location: Notting Hill Gate
- Postal code: W11
- east end: Kensington Park Road
- west end: Ladbroke Grove

Construction
- Construction start: c1862-63

Arundel Gardens is a street and a communal garden square in Notting Hill, London, one of seven streets between Ladbroke Grove and Kensington Park Road of which five share in a communal garden between them. It was built in the 1860s, towards the later stages of the development of the Ladbroke Estate, until that decade part of the rural hinterland of London. Notable past residents of the street include psychologist Charles Samuel Myers, who coined the term shell shock, and the Nobel Prize-winning chemist Sir William Ramsay, discoverer of the noble gases.

== History ==
=== Origins ===
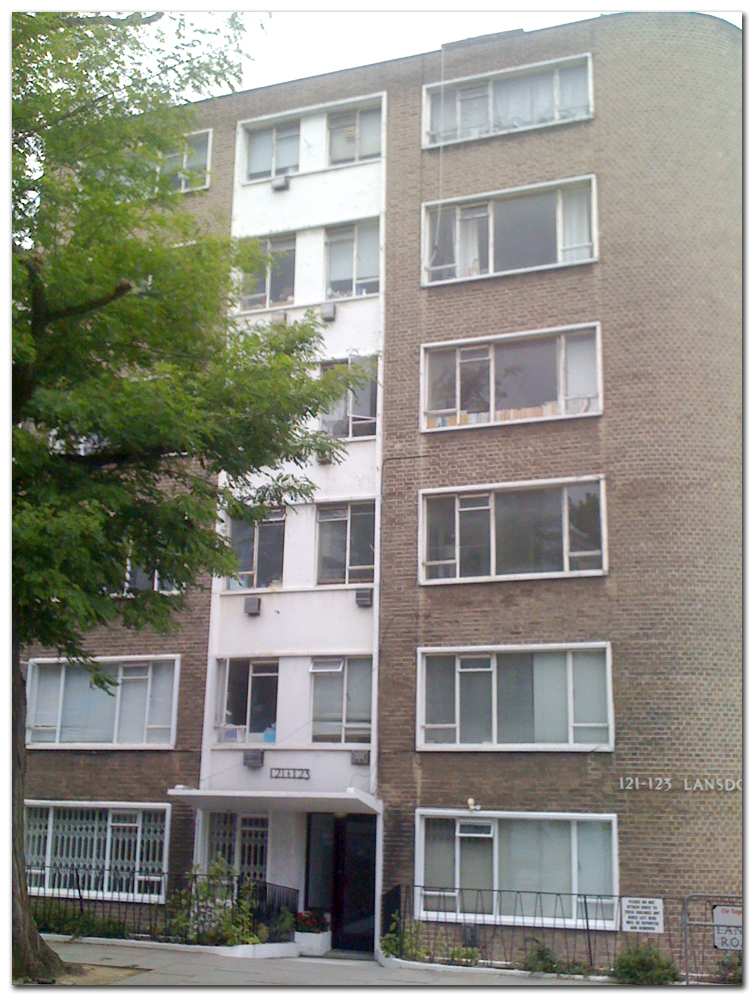
Modern construction at Lansdowne Road. The original building was bombed in WW2

In 1852 one Richard Roy, a solicitor with some experience of building speculation in Cheltenham, acquired from the Ladbroke Estate a freehold parcel of undeveloped land between the south side of what is now Arundel Gardens and the north side of Ladbroke Gardens. In around 1862-3 he granted building leases for the houses on the south side of the street (numbers 1-47), and around the same time granted leases to three other builders to construct houses on the north side of the street.

This was consistent with the usual pattern of development on the Ladbroke Estate, which was for builders to purchase the right to build on a parcel of land, on which they would contract to construct a certain number of houses. They were obliged to pay a ground rent to the landowner, but in return were granted a 99-year lease on the property.

Nos. 2–14 Arundel Gardens were built by the builder Edwin Ware from 1862 to 1863. Other houses on the North side were built by the builders G. W. Simmonds, Leonard Cowling and a builder named Humphreys in 1863.

The houses on both sides back onto elegant communal gardens, originally known as "pleasure grounds", or "paddocks", which are typical of the Ladbroke Estate so fall into the broad definition of garden squares.

The original residents of the street tended to be middle or upper-middle class professionals, with around three or four servants, though a few were of a more bohemian character. The 1871 census shows the painter Anthony Montalba (1813–1884) living at 19 Arundel Gardens with four daughters, all artists, including Clara, Ellen, Hilda and Henrietta. The Montalba sisters were regular contributors to the Royal Academy Summer Exhibition during the 1870s.

In 1880 Colonel W. C. Pond was living at 32 Arundel Gardens. The 1881 census shows one Samuel Bennett, "editor and leader writer" living at number 13.

=== World War 1 ===
During World War I Arundel Gardens was hit by a bomb from a Zeppelin. An angry mob attacked the nearby Electric Cinema, believing that its German-born manager was signalling to the Zeppelin raiders from the roof of the cinema.

=== World War 2 ===
During World War II Arundel Gardens again suffered from bombing. One local resident, Vere Hodgson, recorded in her diary in 1940: "Went to see the houses in Lansdowne Road [next to Arundel Gardens] that caught it. Just heaps of rubble....right on the corner of Ladbroke Grove."

=== 1970s ===
In 1973 the Survey of London was published by the Greater London Council; its authors were not impressed by Arundel Gardens, which they saw as representing a decline from the elegance of earlier parts of the Ladbroke Estate. The street is described as "dull four-story ranges, that on the north side being faced with stucco and that on the south side being of stock brick with coarse flamboyant stucco enrichments". The authors did however concede that the Eastward vista along the street was "agreeably closed" by attractive buildings built by Thomas Pocock on Kensington Park Road.

== Arundel Gardens today ==
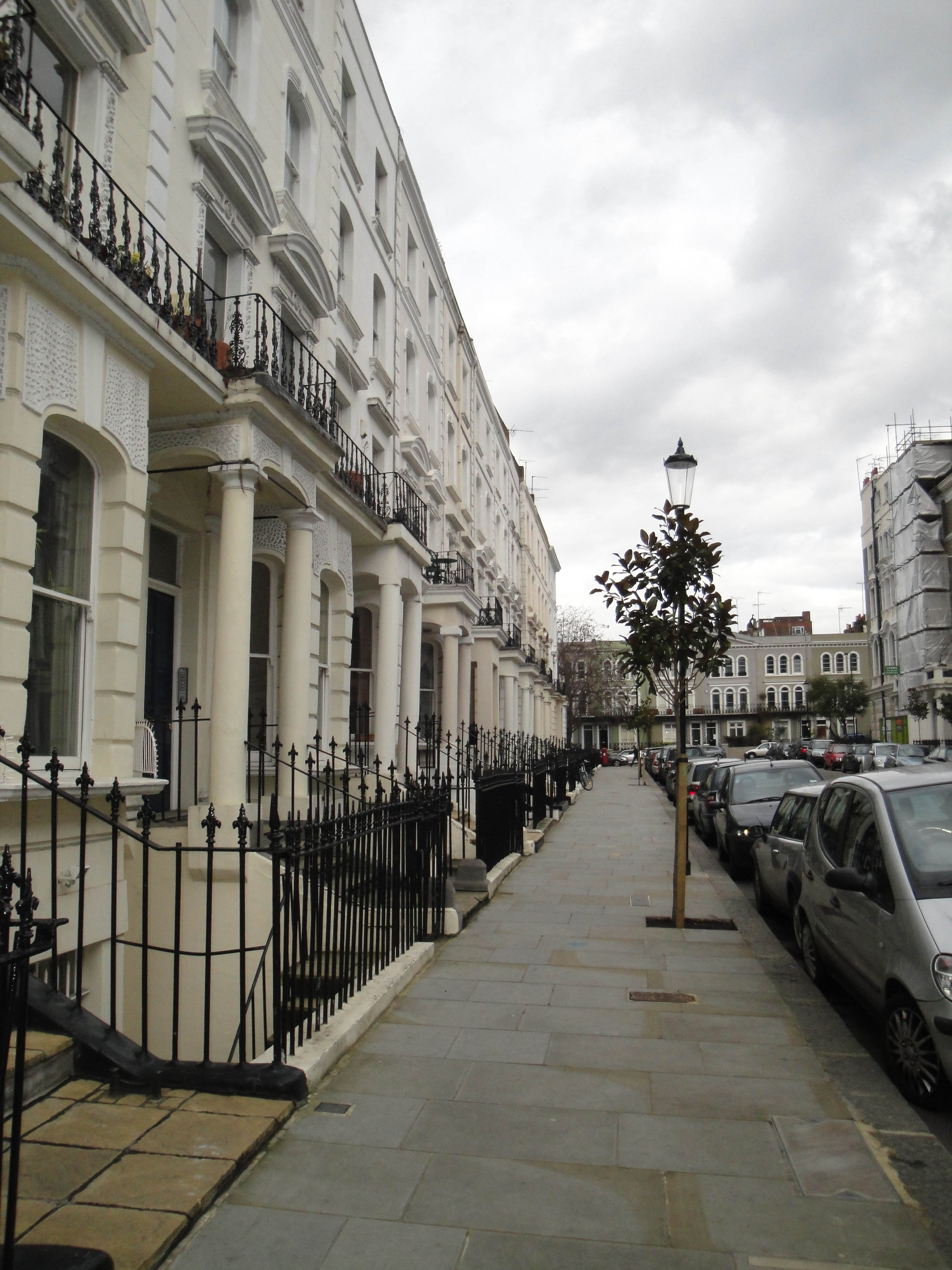
Arundel Gardens, March 2010

The appearance of the street remains little changed today, except for numbers 43–47, on the corner of Ladbroke Grove, which have been replaced by a modern block of flats. Most of the remaining Victorian buildings have had extra mansard stories or loft conversions added, and most have been subdivided into flats, rather than remaining as single family residences for which purpose they were originally designed. A few of the stuccoed cornices are missing, and some of the houses on the south side have had their brickwork painted over. In 2008 the council planted a number of trees in the street. Otherwise the appearance of the street is much as it was when it was originally constructed.

A view of Arundel Gardens is shown in the 1999 film Notting Hill.

The route of the Notting Hill Carnival passes along Arundel Gardens.

== Notable residents ==
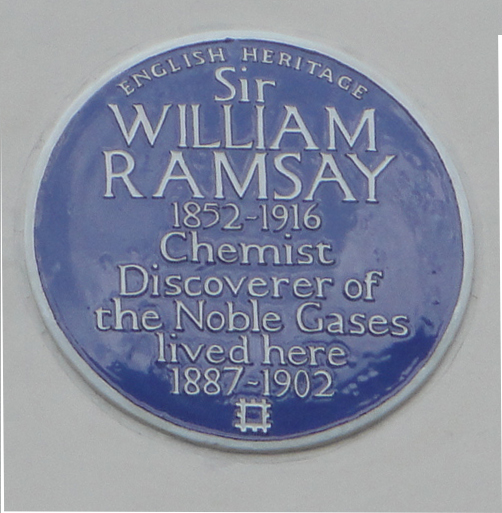
Blue Plaque at 12 Arundel Gardens commemorating the work of William Ramsay.

- Charles Samuel Myers (1873–1946), psychologist, lived at 27 Arundel Gardens from 1887 to 1902. In the 1881 census he is listed as an 8-year-old scholar living with his parents, four brothers and four servants. Myers coined the term shell shock and was co-founder of the British Psychological Society and the National Institute of Industrial Psychology.
- Sir William Ramsay (1852–1916), lived at 12 Arundel Gardens from 1887 to 1902. He was Professor of Chemistry at University College, London, and discoverer of the noble gases Helium, Neon, Argon, Krypton and Xenon, for which he won the 1904 Nobel Prize for Chemistry.
- Record producer Joe Meek lived here in the late 1950s.

== See also ==
- List of garden squares in London
- Garden square
