= Hilda Montalba =

British painter and sculptor (1845–1919)

- Born: Hilda Montalba; 3 December 1845; London, England
- Died: 24 November 1919 (aged 73); Venice, Italy
- Known for: Painter
- Notable work: Boy Unloading a Venetian Market Boat

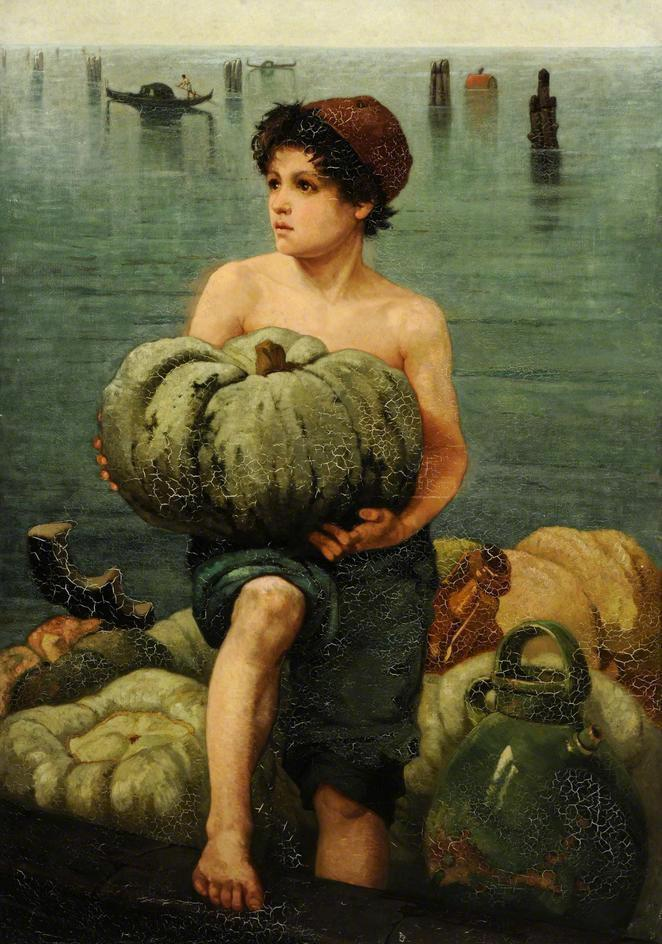
Boy Unloading a Venetian Market Boat by Hilda Montalba

Hilda Montalba (3 December 1845 – 24 November 1919) was a British painter and sculptor.

== Early life ==
Hilda Montalba was born in London on 3 December 1845, one of four daughters of the Swedish-born artist Anthony Rubens Montalba and Emeline (née Davies). The 1871 British census shows Anthony Montalba living at 19 Arundel Gardens, Notting Hill, London, with four daughters, all artists.

== Career ==
Hilda and her three sisters all attained high repute as artists. The Montalba sisters were regular contributors to the Royal Academy Summer Exhibition during the 1870s. Like her sisters, Hilda painted many landscape subjects, including scenes of Venice. Like Clara she painted fishing boats, and also painted close-up studies of Venetian people. One notable example of her work is a painting now in the Graves Art Gallery in Sheffield, Boy Unloading a Venetian Market Boat.

Between 1883 and 1890 she exhibited a number of works at the Grosvenor Gallery in Bond St, initially sculpture, later paintings of Venice, such as Venetian Fog, exhibited in 1890. She exhibited her work at the Woman's Building at the 1893 World's Columbian Exposition in Chicago, Illinois.

Three of her oil paintings are in UK public collections, namely Sheffield Museums and the National Trust.

== See also ==
- Clara Montalba
- Ellen Montalba
- Henrietta Montalba
