= Science and Art Department =

The Science and Art Department was a British government body which functioned from 1853 to 1899, promoting education in art, science, technology, and design in Britain and Ireland.

== Background ==
The Science and Art Department was created as a subdivision of the Board of Trade in 1853, expanding the existing Department of Practical Art. Its first superintendent was Henry Cole, and it supported not just science but also "practical arts" – i.e. technology and design. The department benefited substantially from the Great Exhibition of 1851, part of the profits of which were distributed by the Commissioners of the Great Exhibition for educational purposes. That donation funded a large site in South Kensington accommodating the Science and Art Department, the South Kensington Museum, and other bodies. In 1856 the Science and Art Department was absorbed by a new Education Department, but retained considerable autonomy in promoting artistic and scientific higher education, especially for teacher training.

The Science and Art Department took over the Government School of Design, founded in 1837, which became the National Art Training School in 1853, and finally in 1896 the Royal College of Art, under which name it still flourishes. It developed what became known as the South Kensington system in art education. The headmaster until 1875 was Richard Burchett. On the science side it ran classes in South Kensington in the 1870s, which led directly to the formation of the Normal School of Science, a constituent college of Imperial College London. From 1859 the Science and Art Department had offered examinations for prospective science teachers, and promoted evening classes in science across Britain. From 1872 the Science and Art Department began offering scientific higher education directly through evening classes at the South Kensington site. In 1880 these classes acquired formal recognition as the Normal School of Science.

During the 1880s a number of royal commissions considered the question of technical education, and their recommendations led to an increasing role in scientific training for other branches of government. The increased attention paid to education led to the formation of the Board of Education in 1899, into which the Science and Art Department was fully integrated.

== See also ==
- West London School of Art
