= William of Sens =

French master mason and architect

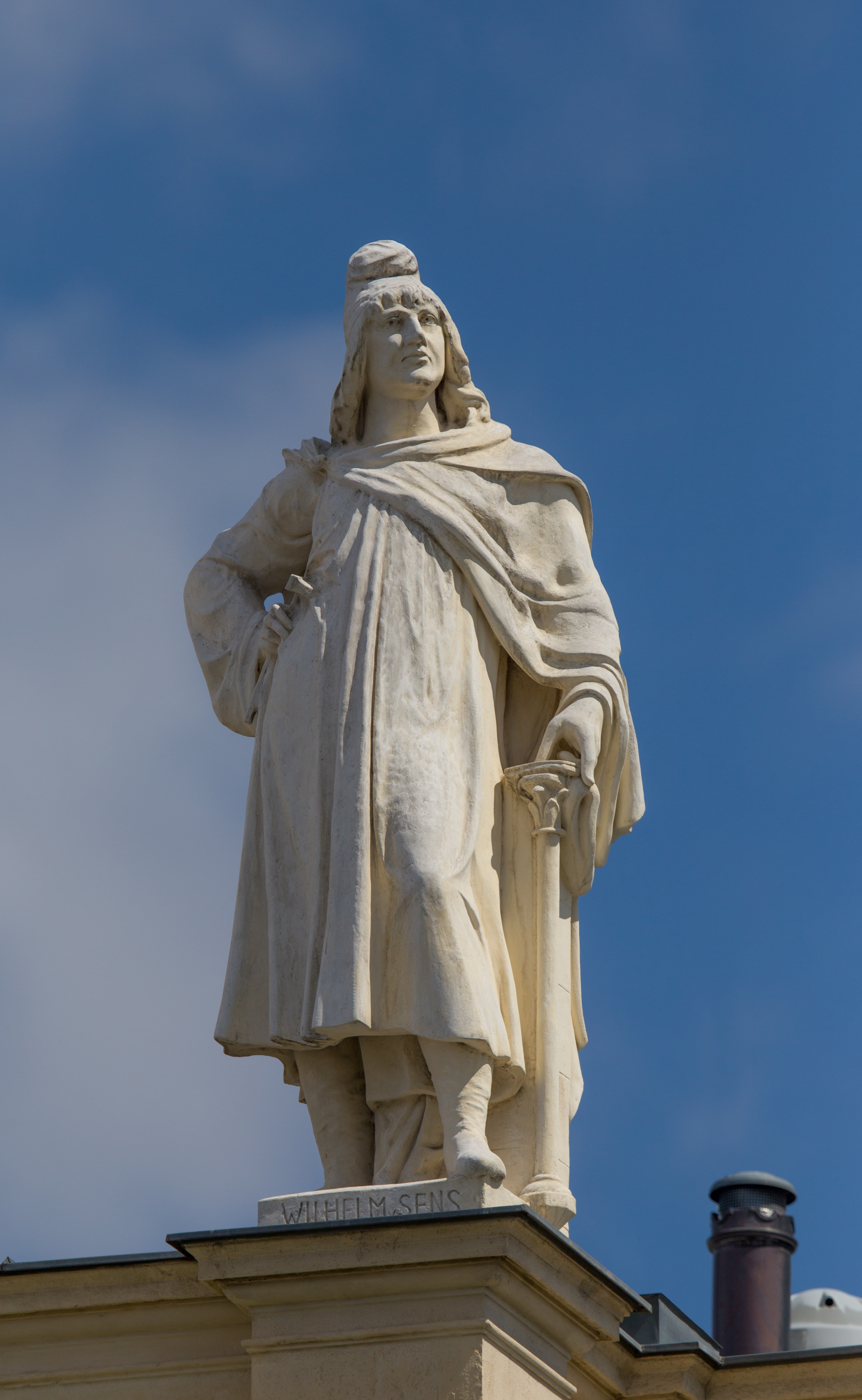
William of Sens, roof figure at the Museum of History of Art, Vienna

William of Sens or Guillaume de Sens (died 11 August 1180) was a 12th-century French master mason and architect, believed to have been born at Sens, France. He is known for rebuilding the choir of Canterbury Cathedral between 1174 and 1177, counted as the first important example of the Early Gothic Style of architecture in England, finished in 1184. Before Canterbury, he worked on Sens Cathedral. According to one English source, he died at Canterbury on 11 August 1180. According to other sources, he died in France, after returning from England.

== Sens Cathedral and Canterbury Cathedral ==
Very little is known of the early life of William of Sens. It is believed that he learned the skills of cathedral construction working on Sens Cathedral, the first complete Gothic cathedral in France, built between 1135 and 1148, shortly before Notre-Dame de Paris. William is believed to have known other early Gothic buildings at Notre-Dame de Paris, Soissons, Rheims, Cambrai, Arras, and at Notre-Dame la Grande, Valenciennes (begun 1171, destroyed in the French Revolution).

His later life in England was chronicled by the monk Gervase of Canterbury, who wrote an account of the destruction by fire of the choir of Canterbury Cathedral in 1174. After the fire, the Chapter of the Cathedral organised a commission of English and French architects to recommend the best way to rebuild the choir. The ideas of William, and most likely his work on Sens Cathedral, resulted in his assignment to rebuild and enlarge the choir of Canterbury Cathedral.

William is responsible for the choir eastwards of the crossing and for the western transept. William planned the choir, as well as other parts of the structure which are still in place, including the flying buttresses copied from the early Gothic cathedral Notre-Dame de Paris. He introduced the six-part rib vault to the building, a key feature of Gothic architecture, which support the roof and which spread the weight downwards and outwards to the Buttresses outside and the columns below. He also introduced the use of high arcades in the choir, and devised the structure which made the walls between the structural elements thinner, allowing more and larger windows which filled the church with light.

The innovations of William at Canterbury included the motif of pale Caen stone contrasted with dark column shafts of Purbeck marble, and the sexpartite rib-vaults, which form paired bays in the nave. The combination of these two limestones was influential in subsequent Gothic architecture, which Canterbury helped to spread through its prominence as the episcopal see of the Primate of All England.

William was working on the church in 1177 when he slipped and fell from the scaffolding, and was badly injured. The chronicler Gervase recorded that the accident was "The vengeance of God or the spite of the Devil." He tried for a time to direct the reconstruction from his sickbed. He completed the eastern portion of construction but finally decided to return to France, where he died in 1180. The work on Canterbury Cathedral was completed by another architect, known only as William the Englishman, who followed his plans. The second William completed the eastern portion of the church, including the vaults of the choir, the eastern transept, the Trinity Chapel, and chapel of Thomas Becket. It was finished in 1184, not long after William of Sens's death. The former's plans were changed by the latter to include a triforium-gallery based on the example of Laon Cathedral's.

William designed a small domed chapel at the far eastern end of the Cathedral as a shrine, the Corona, (1184) dedicated to the cathedral's archbishop Thomas Becket, who had been murdered in the cathedral in 1170. Its unusual form resembles the rotundas placed in the eastern end of churches in William's native province of Burgundy.

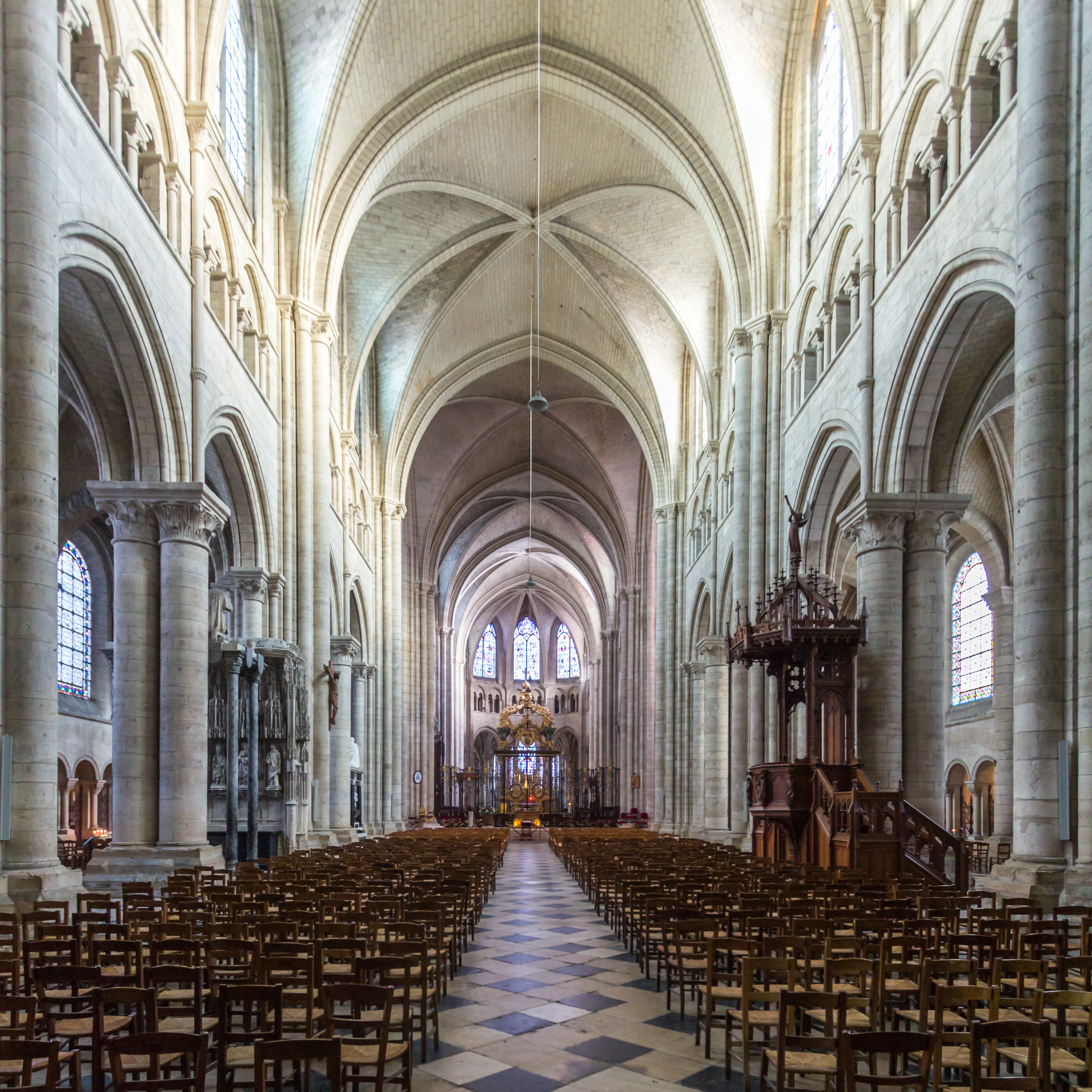
Choir of Sens Cathedral (1135–1164)

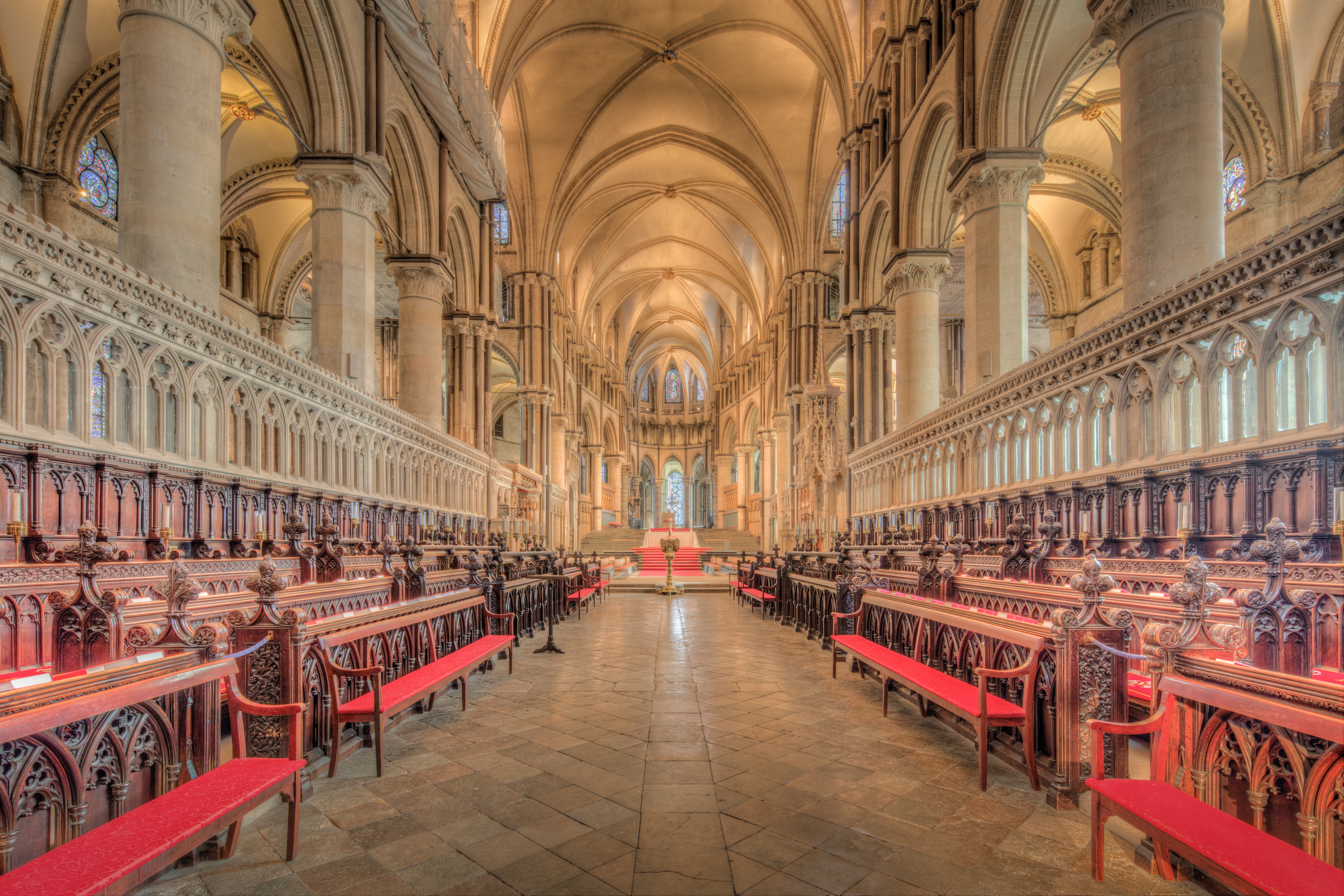
Rebuilt Choir of Canterbury Cathedral (1174–84). (The lower arcades and stalls are a later addition.)

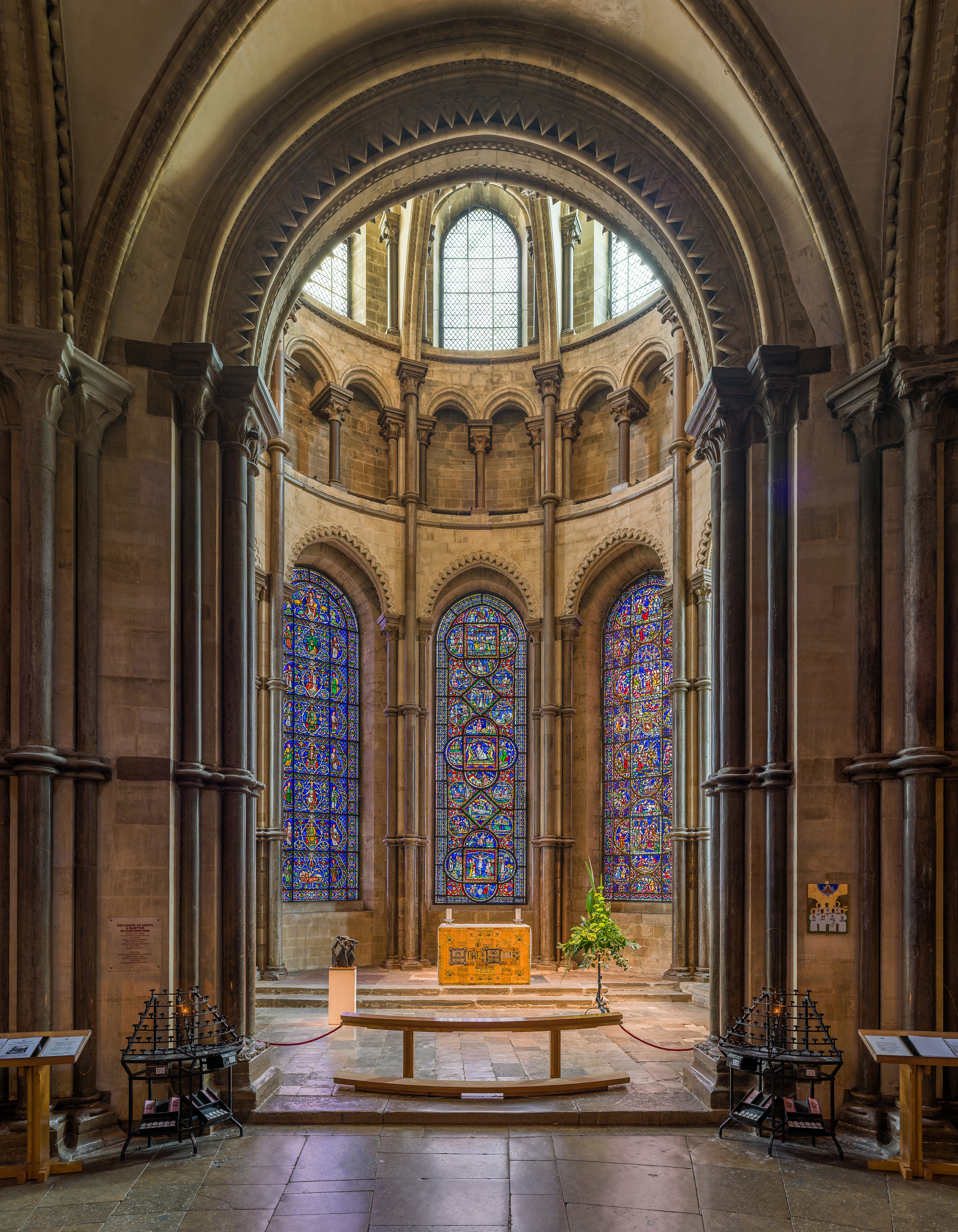
The Corona – domed chapel of St Thomas Becket

== Bibliography ==
- Erlande-Brandenburg, Alain (1999). Encyclopedia Univeralis Dictionnaire des Architects (in French). Encyclopedia Universalis. ISBN 2-226-10952-8.
- Bechmann, Roland (2017). Les Racines des Cathédrales (in French). Payot. ISBN 978-2-228-90651-7.
