= Henrietta Montalba =

British sculptor (1848–1893)

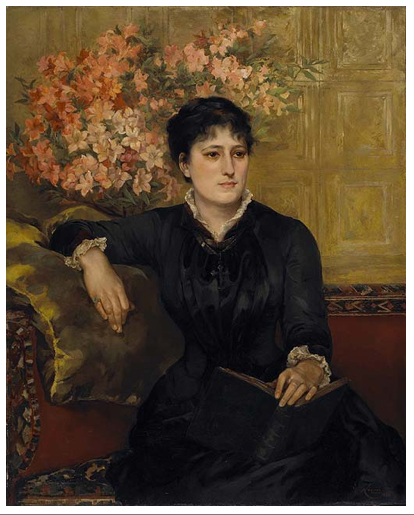
- Henrietta Montalba painted by The Princess Louise in 1882
- Born: Henrietta Mary Ann Skerrett Montalba; 8 April 1848; England
- Died: 8 April 1893 (aged 45); Venice, Italy
- Known for: Sculpture

Henrietta Mary Ann Skerrett Montalba (8 April 1848 – 14 September 1893) was a British sculptor, born into a renowned family of artists. She studied art at what was to become the Royal College of Art with fellow-student, Princess Louise, Duchess of Argyll. The Princess painted a portrait of her which today hangs in the collection of the National Gallery of Canada.

Montalba first exhibited at the Royal Academy in 1876, and her work was often seen at the Grosvenor Gallery in London. Montalba was rarely separated from her family, residing in later days chiefly at the family home in Venice, Italy. She died in Venice on 14 September 1893 and was buried near her father in the island cemetery of San Michele. One of her sculptures, a bronze titled Boy Catching a Crab, is in the collection of The Victoria and Albert Museum.

== Early life ==
Henrietta Montalba was born on 8 April 1848, the fifth child and the fourth daughter of Anthony Rubens Montalba and Emeline (née Davies), all of whom would attain considerable success as artists. Her birth was at 9 Camden Terrace West, Camden New Town, Saint Pancras in London. Her birth was registered by her mother on 6 October 1848 with the given name Henrietta Mary Ann Skerrett Montalba. Her father's profession was given as gentleman. The 1871 British census shows Anthony Montalba living at 19 Arundel Gardens, Notting Hill, London, with four daughters, all artists. Montalba studied first at what was to become the Royal College of Art in South Kensington, and then in the Accademia di Belle Arti in Venice. Later she became a pupil of Jules Dalou, the French sculptor, during his residence in London.

== Career ==
Montalba first exhibited at the Royal Academy in 1876, and her work was often seen at the Grosvenor Gallery, the New Gallery, and elsewhere.

She mainly devoted herself to portrait or fancy busts; some executed in marble, like those of Doctor Mezger of Amsterdam (Grosvenor Gallery, 1886), and Dr. Schollander, the Scandinavian artist; others in bronze, like that of the Marquess of Lorne; but the greater part of her work was executed in terra cotta, as in the case of her bust of Robert Browning (Grosvenor Gallery, 1883). Other works worthy of note were "A Dalecarlian Peasant Woman" and "The Raven," representing a raven seated on a bust of Pallas, from the poem by Edgar Allan Poe. Her last work was of a more ambitious nature, being a life-size figure of "A Venetian Boy Catching a Crab," executed in bronze, which was exhibited at the Royal Academy in 1893, and at the World's Columbian Exposition, Chicago, in the same year. Her marble bust of Richard Burchett, headmaster of the South Kensington Schools, has been transferred to the new building of the Royal Academy of Art, along with its setting designed by George Clausen.

=== Royal favour ===
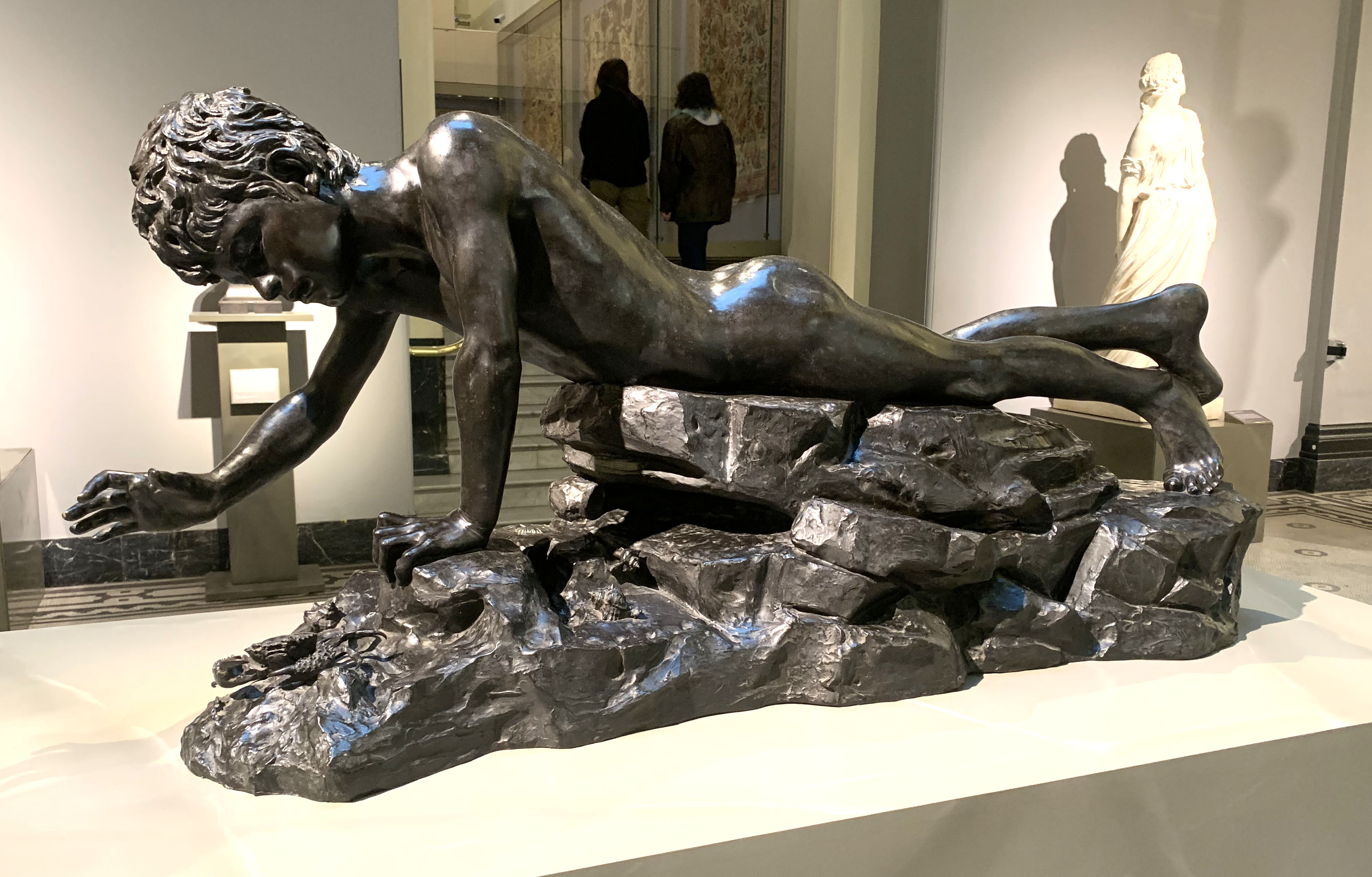
Boy Catching a Crab by Henrietta Montalba

She was on terms of friendship with her fellow-student Princess Louise, Duchess of Argyll, who painted a portrait of her and presented it to the Canadian Academy of Arts in Ottawa (now in the collection of the National Gallery of Canada). Both Henrietta and her sister Clara spent time with the Princess in Canada, painting landscapes.

Henrietta was rarely separated from her family, living in later days chiefly in Venice, and making frequent visits with them in Italy, Sweden, and elsewhere. Besides her artistic gifts she possessed great linguistic talent.

== Death and legacy ==
In 1892 her health began to fail her, and after a lingering illness she died in Venice, on 14 September 1893, and was buried near her father in the cemetery of San Michele.

One of her sculptures, a bronze titled Boy Catching a Crab, from 1893, is displayed in The Victoria and Albert Museum. Her marble bust of her principal at college, the heavily bearded painter Richard Burchett, set in an elaborate pink alabaster memorial frame designed by George Clausen, has followed the Royal College of Art to its new Darwin Building on Kensington Gore, where it is installed in a courtyard.

== See also ==
- Clara Montalba
- Ellen Montalba
- Hilda Montalba
