= Butades =

Ancient Greek artist

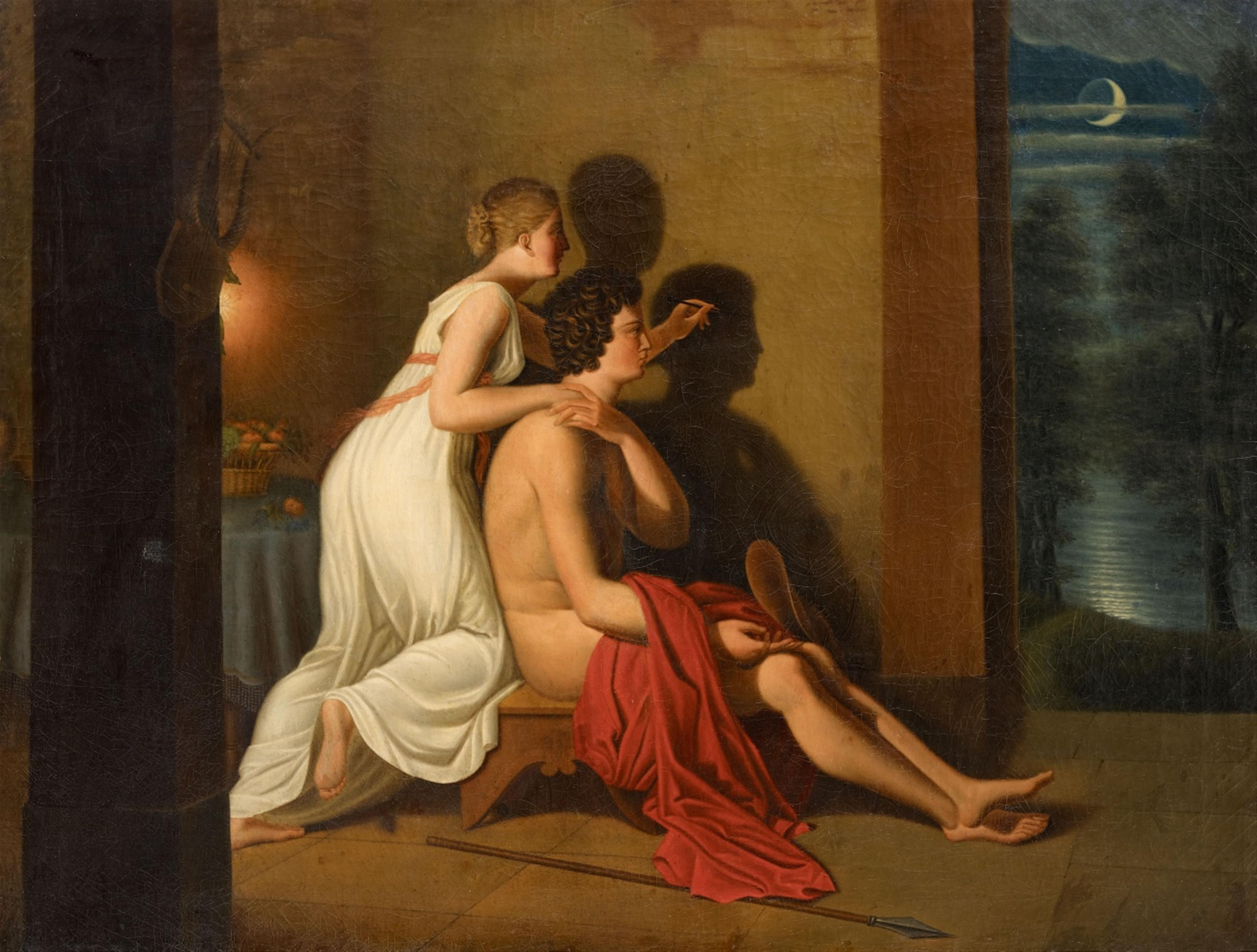
The Invention of Painting by Louis Ducis

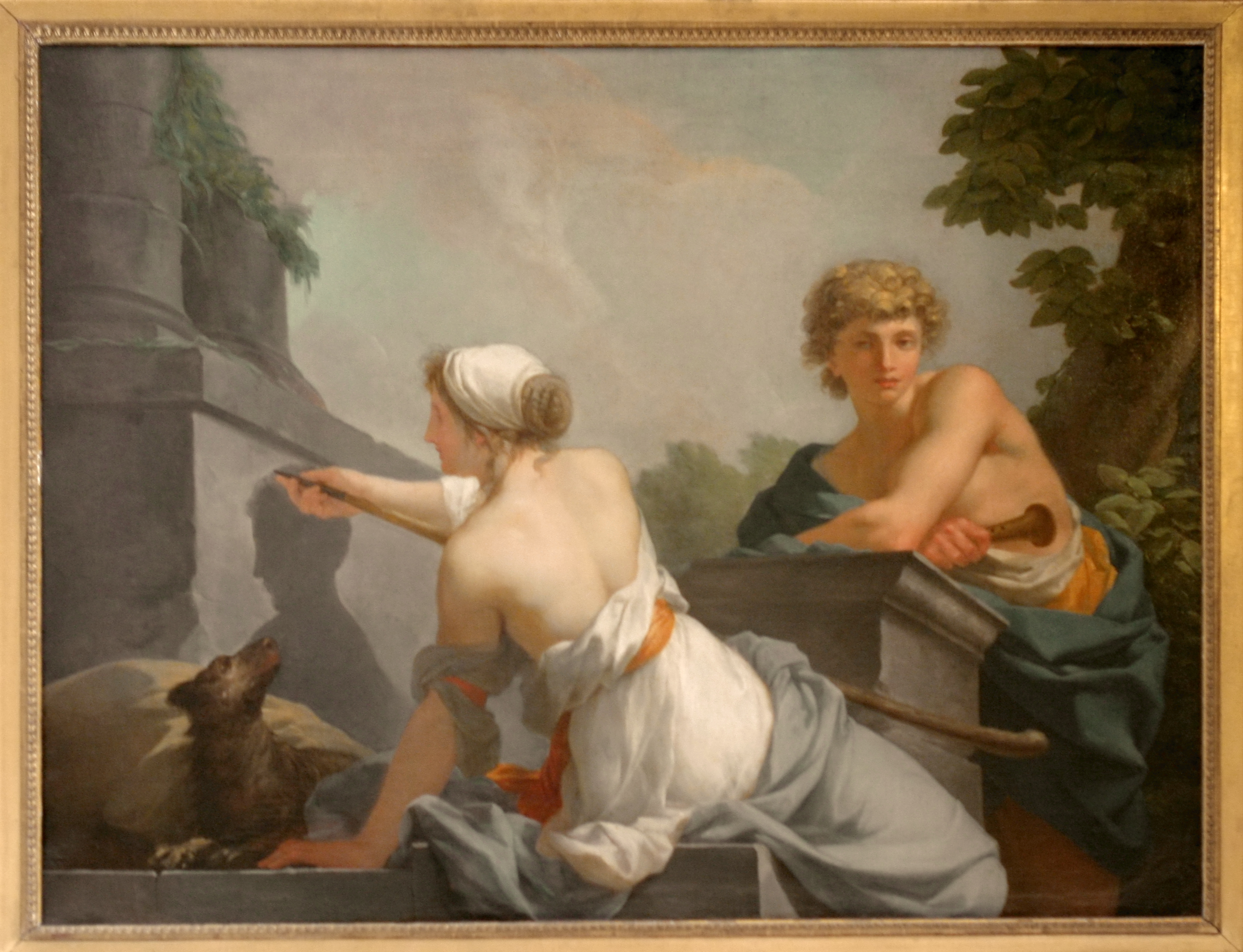
The Origin of Painting by Jean-Baptiste Regnault, 1785

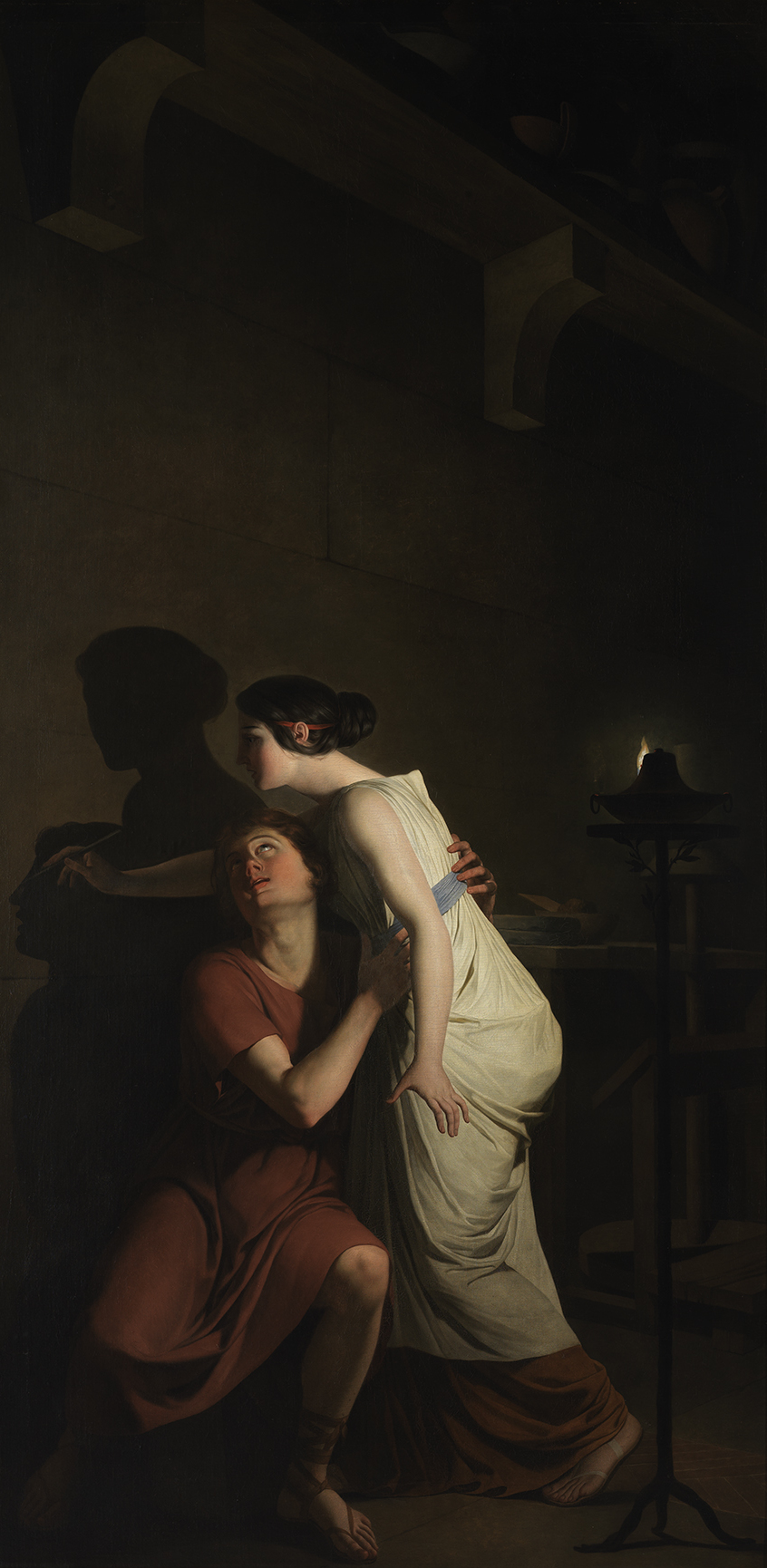
The invention of the art of drawing. Joseph-Benoît Suvée. Musea Brugge - Groeningemuseum. c. 1791

Butades of Sicyon (Ancient Greek: Βουτάδης Boutades), sometimes mistakenly called Dibutades, was the reputed inventor of the art of modelling clay in relief. An accident first led him to practise, in conjunction with his daughter, at Corinth. The period at which he flourished is unknown, but has been estimated at 600 BC.

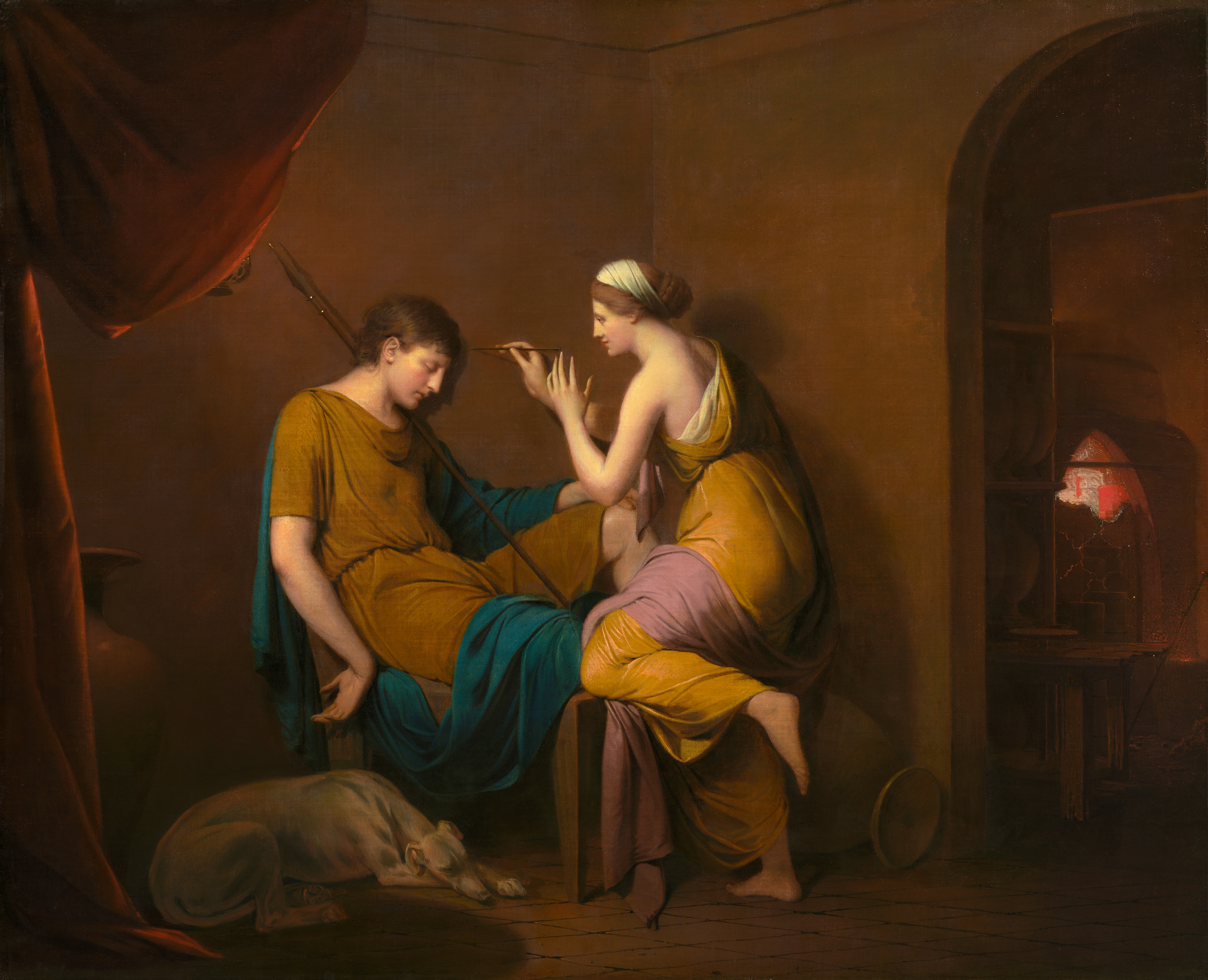
The Corinthian Maid by Joseph Wright of Derby

The story, as recorded by Pliny the Elder, is that his daughter was smitten with love for a youth at Corinth where they lived. When he was due to go abroad, she drew the outline of his shadow on a wall thrown by the light of a lamp. It was upon this outline her father modelled a face of the youth in clay, which he baked along with the clay tiles which it was his trade to make. This model was preserved in the Nymphaeum in Corinth until Mummius sacked that city in 146 BC.

Because of this occurrence with his daughter, Butades began a practice that is supported by a large body of existing evidence: he began to decorate the ends or edges of rain gutter roof tiles with masks of human faces, first in low relief (prostypa), then in high relief (ectypa). It was from these terra-cotta figures that the ornaments on the pediments of temples originated. Pliny adds that Butades invented the colouring of plastic works by adding a red colour to them; from the existing works of this kind it seems to have been red sand, or modelling them in red chalk. He is also said to have invented a mixture of clay and ruddle (red ochre), or to have introduced the use of a special kind of red clay. And it is because of him that modellers get the Greek name plastae.

== Sources ==
- Naturalis Historia, Liber XXXV
- Naturalis Historiae, Liber XXXV
