= Anthony R. Montalba =

British painter

Anthony Rubens Montalba (1812–24 July 1884) was a Swedish-born, naturalised British painter and the head of a family of renowned artists that based itself in Venice in the later part of the nineteenth-century. He may be known best as the editor of an 1849 story collection illustrated by Richard Doyle, Fairy Tales from All Nations.

== Fairy Tales from All Nations ==
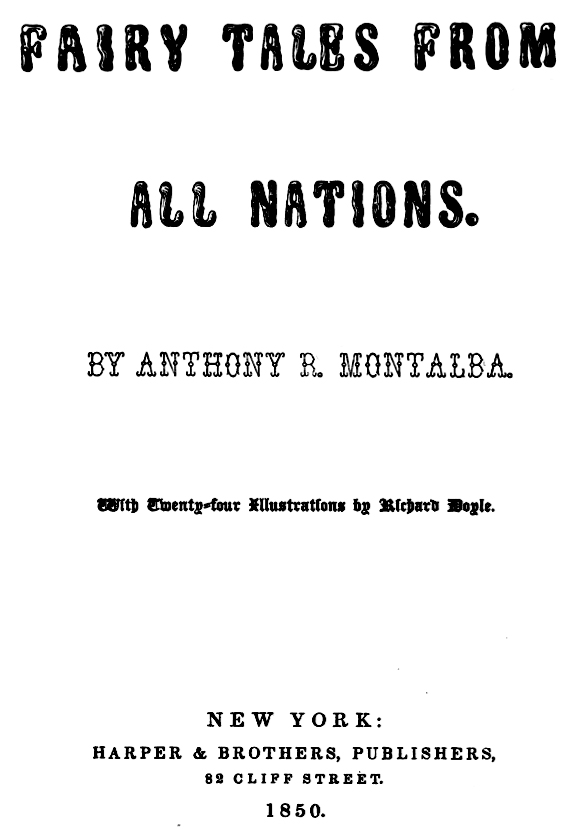
Title page of the US edition

Montalba edited Fairy Tales from All Nations, illustrated by Richard Doyle and published by Chapman & Hall in 1849.

In the introduction to his book, Montalba declared that the folly of declaring fairy tales to be immoral had now been "cast off". Jack Zipes explains the Puritanical background and the flowering after 1840 in the introduction to his Victorian Fairy Tales anthology.

The US publisher quoted a review in the British literary magazine The Athenaeum:

"Mr Montalba has put a girdle round the earth, and brought home a sprite from most countries under the moon, to gambol upon our clean-swept hearths, in a Christmas night, or on our garden terraces when the midsummer sun is sinking, and there is scarce light enough left to read by. * * * Mr. Doyle's illustrations do their full part in making the book attractive.—London Athenaeum."

(Harper & Brothers announced the US edition as forthcoming "In December", and it may have been published then, although dated 1850 on the title page.)

A new edition of collection was published in 1872 under the title Famous Fairy Tales, or perhaps Famous Fairy Tales of All Nations, probably in four volumes. (Library of Congress catalogue records: LCCN 25-38579; LCCN 44-10249.)

== Life ==
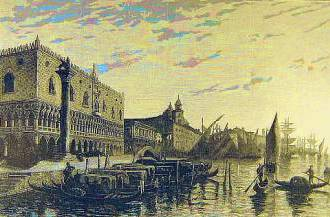
Venice by Clara Montalba

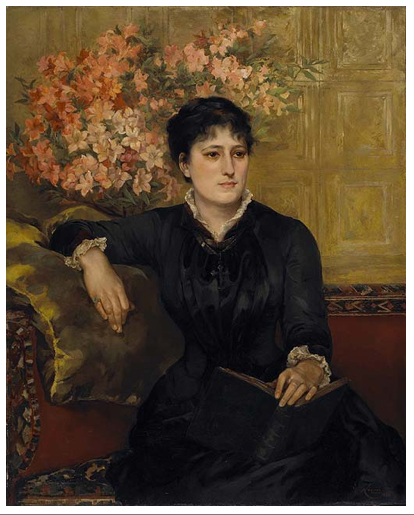
Henrietta Montalba painted by the Princess Louise

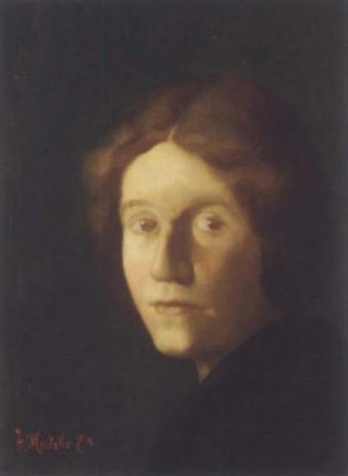
Self portrait by Ellen Montalba, 1885

Montalba was the son of Aron Abrahamson and Frederika Schlesinger. He was born in 1812 in Karlskrona, Blekinge Iän, Sweden and named Salomon.

Montalba married an English woman, Emeline Davies, in 1839. The couple had five children, four daughters and a son:

- Clara Frederica (1840–1929) Clara studied in Paris under Eugene Isabey and later in Venice, where her family moved, at the Accademia di Belle Arti. She attained international recognition following exhibitions in Europe and America. She specialized in watercolors, most notably scenes from her family's home in Venice, where she lived at the end of the 19th century. Clara Montalba exhibited her work at the Palace of Fine Arts and The Woman's Building at the 1893 World's Columbian Exposition in Chicago, Illinois.
- Ellen Emeline (1842–1912), who studied at the Royal College of Art and in Europe, being based in Venice along with her family. She painted a number of portraits and landscape paintings. Among the portraits she exhibited was one of her sister Clara.
- Edward Augustus (1843–1938), whose house in Venice became a gathering place for artists.
- Hilda Montalba (1845–1919). Like her sisters, Hilda painted many landscape subjects, including scenes of Venice. Like Clara she painted fishing boats, and also painted close-up studies of Venetian people. One notable example of her work is a painting now in the Graves Art Gallery in Sheffield, Boy Unloading a Venetian Market Boat.
- Henrietta Mary Ann Skerrett (1848–1893). Henrietta was a noted sculptor who studied first at what was to become the Royal College of Art in South Kensington, and then in the Accademia di Belle Arti at Venice. Later she became a pupil of Jules Dalou, the French sculptor, during his residence in London. She was on terms of friendship with her fellow-student Princess Louise, Duchess of Argyll, who painted a portrait of her and presented it to the Canadian Academy of Arts in Ottawa (now in the collection of the National Gallery of Canada).

The 1871 British census shows Montalba living at 19 Arundel Gardens, Notting Hill, London, with four daughters, all artists.

Montalba died in Venice on 24 July 1884.
