= Clara Montalba =

British artist (1840–1929)

- Born: 2 August 1840; Cheltenham, England
- Died: 14 August 1929 (aged 89); Venice, Italy
- Education: Accademia di Belle Arti
- Known for: Painter

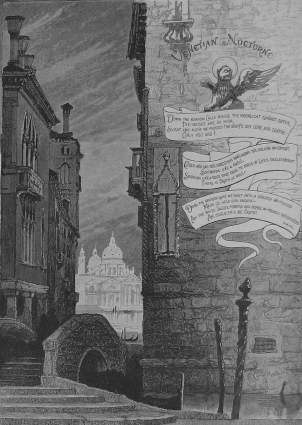
Decorative page by Clara Montalba

Clara Federica Montalba RWS (2 August 1840 – 14 August 1929) was a British artist, chiefly known for her watercolour paintings of Venice. She was the eldest of four daughters of the Swedish-born artist Anthony Rubens Montalba, all of whom achieved considerable artistic success, though Clara was arguably the most successful and best-known of the four. Between 1879 and 1889 she exhibited her work at the Grosvenor Gallery, London. An early feminist, in 1886 she was named by Millicent Garrett Fawcett as one of twenty successful and accomplished women who had given "warm help and support" to the movement. In 1892, in recognition of her artistic talent, she was admitted into the Royal Watercolour Society. She died in Venice in 1929.

== Early life ==
Clara was born in Cheltenham on 2 August 1840, the eldest of the four daughters of the Swedish-born artist Anthony Rubens Montalba and Emeline (née Davies).

== Career ==
She and her three sisters (Ellen Emeline, Hilda Montalba, and Henrietta Mary Ann Skerrett) all attained high repute as artists. She studied in Paris under Eugene Isabey and later in Venice, where her family moved, at the Accademia di Belle Arti, in the 1880s and 1890s. The 1871 British census shows Anthony Montalba living at 19 Arundel Gardens, Notting Hill, London, with four daughters, all artists.

The Montalba sisters were regular contributors to the Royal Academy Summer Exhibition during the 1870s. She attained international recognition following exhibitions in Europe and America. She specialized in watercolors, most notably scenes from her family's home in Venice, where she lived at the end of the 19th century. Clara Montalba exhibited her work at the Palace of Fine Arts and The Woman's Building at the 1893 World's Columbian Exposition in Chicago, Illinois.

Clara was arguably the most accomplished and best-known of the four Montalba sisters, and in 1892 she was admitted into the Royal Watercolour Society, styling herself RWS.

Between 1879 and 1889 she exhibited her work at the Grosvenor Gallery, showing a series of scenes painted in Venice, which captured the unique mood and atmosphere of Venetian life.

=== Feminism ===
Clara appears to have been an early champion of women's rights, being named in 1886 by Millicent Garrett Fawcett as one of twenty successful and accomplished women who had given "warm help and support" to the movement.

=== Royal favour ===
Both Clara and her sister Henrietta were friends with the Princess Louise, Duchess of Argyll, who was herself an accomplished artist. They spent time with the Princess in Canada, painting landscapes. Princess Louise married the Marquess of Lorne in 1878, who was soon chosen to be Canada's new Governor General. Louise thus became his Viceregal Consort and the couple arrived to be sworn in at Halifax on 25 November. They left Canada on 27 October 1883.

=== Gallery ===
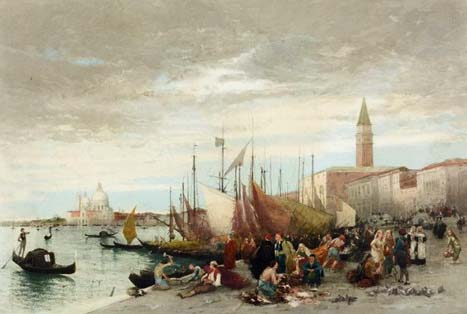
Fisherfolk before the Doges, Palace, 1877

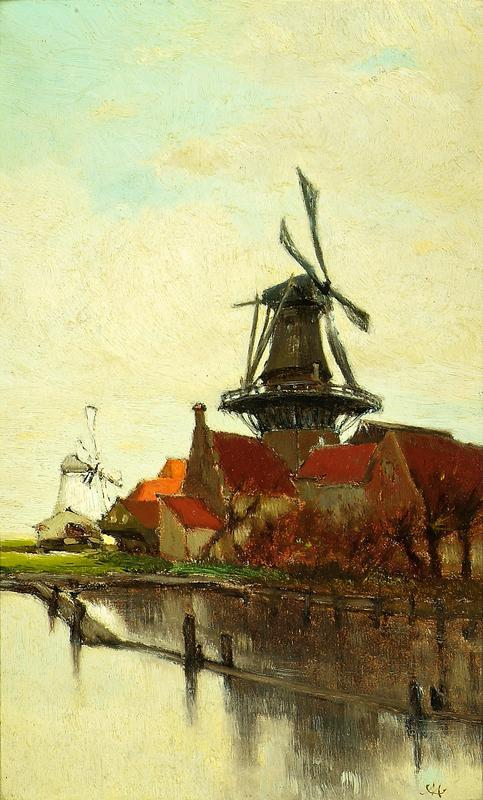
A Dutch Windmill, 1885, Aberdeen Art Gallery

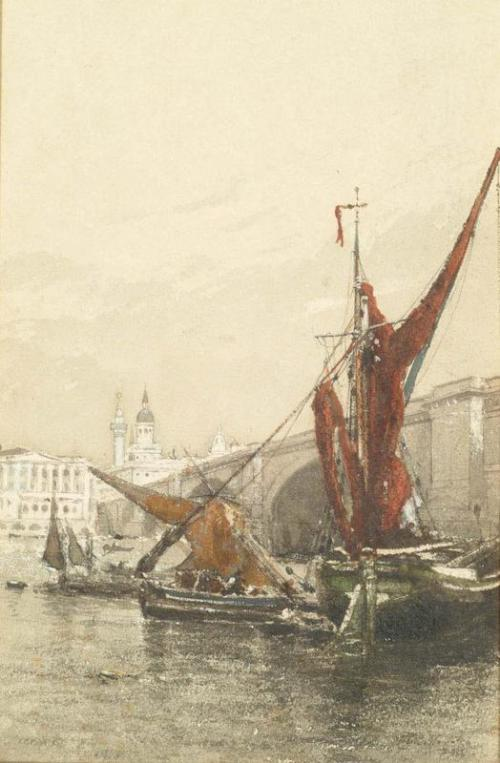
London Bridge, Aberdeen Art Gallery

== Death ==
Clara Montalba died in Venice, Italy in 1929.
