= The Lonely Londoners =

1956 novel by Samuel Selvon

- First US edition
- Author: Samuel Selvon
- Language: English
- Publisher: Allan Wingate (UK); St Martin's Press (US)
- Publication date: 1956
- Publication place: United Kingdom
- Media type: Print (hardback & paperback)
- Pages: 142 pp.
- OCLC: 65467567

The Lonely Londoners is a 1956 novel by Trinidadian author Samuel Selvon. Its publication was one of the first to focus on poor, working-class black people following the enactment of the British Nationality Act 1948 alongside George Lamming's (1954) novel The Emigrants. The Lonely Londoners was included on the "Big Jubilee Read" list of 70 books selected by a panel of experts, and announced in April 2022 by the BBC and The Reading Agency, to celebrate Queen Elizabeth II's platinum jubilee in June 2022.

== Overview ==
The book details the life of West Indians in post-World War II London, a city the immigrants consider the "centre of the world." Covering a period of roughly three years, The Lonely Londoners has no plot in the usual sense of the term. The novel follows a limited number of characters of the "Windrush generation", all of them "coloureds", through their daily lives in the capital. The various threads of action form a whole through the unifying central character of Trinidadian Moses Aloetta, a veteran émigré who, after more than ten years in London, has still not achieved anything of note and whose homesickness increases as he gets older. Every Sunday morning "the boys", many of them recent arrivals, come together in his rented room to trade stories and inquire after those whom they have not seen for a while. Their lives mainly consist of work (or looking for work) and various petty pleasures.

According to British Guyanese writer David Dabydeen, Moses Aloetta was "conceived of as an Indian," but in the novel Selvon depicts "West Indian migrants, irrespective of their ethnicities, forming a community" because "he didn't want to bring the ethnic divisions that we have so trenchantly in the Caribbean to fiction in England."

== Social commentary ==
A recurring theme in Selvon's character development addresses upward social mobility. This mobility is clouded by the character's designation as the "other". Selvon's characters are offered the worst jobs, they are exploited by housing landlords, and their romantic ventures oftentimes only includes sex. Their accents and race mark them as outsiders and force them to form a group identity based on the principle of congregation via segregation. Though they have various coping mechanisms: sex, lavish spending, drinking, hard work, appeasing white women, etc., the novel ultimately conveys unity in their experiences and the self-hatred, disappointment, and struggle that haunt them. The protagonist, Moses, describes London as a lonely city that "divide[s] up in little worlds, and you stay in the world where you belong to and you don't know anything about what is happening in the other ones except what you read in the papers." Against a backdrop of invisibility, many of the characters struggle with a sense of failed promise. Regardless of their actions, a certain sense of stagnancy prevails. Moses says: "...I just lay there on the bed thinking about my life, how after all these years I ain't get no place at all, I still the same way, neither forward nor backward."

Helon Habila has noted: "One imagines immediately the loneliness that must have gnawed at these immigrants whose memory of their sunny, convivial island communities was their only refuge at such moments. But although this is a book about exile and alienation, it is not a sad book. Even when his characters are under-going the direst of tribulations, Selvon has a way of capturing the humour in the situation.... The message of The Lonely Londoners is even more vital today than in 50s Britain: that, although we live in societies increasingly divided along racial, ideological and religious lines, we must remember what we still have in common – our humanity."

== Narrative technique, language and style ==
The most striking feature of The Lonely Londoners is its narrative voice. Selvon started writing the novel in standard English but soon found out that such language would not aptly convey the experiences and the unarticulated thoughts and desires of his characters. In creating a third person narrator who uses the same creolized form of English as the characters of the novel, Selvon added a new, multiculturalist dimension to the traditional London novel and enhanced the awareness in both readers and writers of a changing London society which could no longer be ignored. Thus, in style and context, The Lonely Londoners "represented a major step forward in the process of linguistic and cultural decolonization."

The language used by Selvon's characters and by the narrator contains a multitude of slang expressions. For example, when "the boys" talk about "the Water" or "the Gate", they are referring to Bayswater and Notting Hill respectively. (Unlike today, the Notting Hill area evoked a down-at-heel area of cheap lodgings where Caribbean immigrants could more easily find accommodation than elsewhere in London, but be victims of practices like Rachmanism.) Sometimes referring to themselves and each other as "spades", in their spare time they can be found "liming"—the Caribbean pastime of hanging around with friends eating, talking and drinking—and some of their talk will be "oldtalk", reminiscences of their previous lives in the West Indies and the exchange of news from home. Finally, a white English girl can be a "skin" ("a sharp piece of skin"), a "cat", a "number", a "chick" or "white pussy".

A remarkable passage within the novel about a typical London summer is written in the stream-of-consciousness mode, linking up Selvon with the modernist movement.

== Adaptations ==
- 1997: five-part abridgement by Margaret Busby, Book at Bedtime, BBC Radio 4, read by Rudolph Walker (10–14 March), produced by Ralph Rolls.
- 2014: five-part abridgement by Lauris Morgan-Griffiths, Book at Bedtime, BBC Radio 4, read by Don Warrington, produced by Sara Davies.
- 2024: stage adaptation by Roy Williams at Jermyn Street Theatre.
- 2025: stage adaptation by Roy Williams at Kiln Theatre.

== See also ==
Other novels with the theme of the immigrant experience among Caribbeans in London include:

- Warwick Collins: Gents (1997)
- Victor Headley: Yardie (1992)
- George Lamming: The Emigrants (1954)
- Andrea Levy: Small Island (2004)
- Colin MacInnes: City of Spades (1957) and Absolute Beginners (1959)
- V. S. Naipaul: The Mimic Men (1967)
- Caryl Phillips: The Final Passage (1985)
- Zadie Smith: White Teeth (2000)
