= The Final Passage =

1985 novel by Caryl Phillips

- First edition (p/b)
- Author: Caryl Phillips
- Language: English
- Publisher: Faber and Faber
- Publication date: London, 1985
- Publication place: United Kingdom
- Media type: Print
- ISBN: 0-571-13438-6 (1985 paperback edition)
- OCLC: 11399626
- Dewey Decimal: 823/.914 20
- LC Class: PR9275.S263 P473 1985

The Final Passage is Caryl Phillips's debut novel. First published in 1985, it is about the Caribbean diaspora exemplified in the lives of a young family from a small island of the British West Indies who decide to join the 1950s exodus to the mother country. They arrive in London full of hope, but their hopes are thwarted while new challenges, if not opportunities, never thought of before, seem to arise.

== Plot summary ==
The year is 1958. Leila is a 19-year-old woman who has to care for her very sick mother. She has never known her father, and her mother, who is only 40, has even refrained from telling her about him. As her skin is lighter than that of most of the other islanders she believes that she was the product of an affair her mother must have had with a white man. That, she thinks, would also explain her mother's distrust of white people, an attitude she has always tried to pass on to her daughter. Leila has a very good friend in Millie, who is more down to earth and knows much better what she wants to achieve in life.

Leila's boyfriend Michael, who is in his early twenties, is an irresponsible young man whose main interests are sex and drink. He does odd delivery jobs on his scooter for his friend Bradeth, but most time of the day the two men can be seen outside one of the small bars getting drunk on beer. Michael has fathered an illegitimate child but has not made any real effort to move in with its mother. Rather, as his own parents are dead, he still lives in his grandmother's house.

Rather than wait for Arthur, who has declared his love for her but left the island promising to come back soon, Leila has set her eyes on Michael, who before long agrees to become her husband. However, their marriage gets off to a bad start and cannot even be patched up when their son Calvin is born, whom Michael at first does not even come to visit. One day Leila is shocked to find her mother gone. A letter informs her that on her doctor's advice she has left for England in order to seek medical treatment there.

Leila finds life on the small island increasingly unbearable, and her wish to emigrate to England and to reunite with her mother becomes stronger and stronger. It turns out that Michael is not averse to the idea, and so Leila arranges everything for her young family's "final passage." Bradeth and Millie, who are also a couple now expecting their second child, cannot be persuaded to leave with them:

[...] But Millie was adamant. "Too many people beginning to act like it's a sinful thing to want to stay on this island but there don't be no law which say you must go to England, you know. People here too much follow fashion." Leila did not have time to answer. "So Michael, why you don't say something? You being too damn quiet for my reasoning."

"Well, I think you right some of the way but I don't think it can be anything but good for a young family. I mean there is where all the opportunity is, and it don't mean to say we can't come back here with some profits after we finish working over there if it's so we choose to do.

Millie was quick to speak again. "So just tell me how many people you see coming back from England with anything except the clothes they standing up in?"

"No, Millie, it's not fair." Michael wanted to get up to make his point but he remained seated. "People only been going out there a few years so why they should be coming back now? It's just starting."

People leave in masses, the huge ship is packed with emigrants most of whom are lured away from their home by the prospect of a better life. All they can go on, however, are snippets of pseudo-information, misconceptions, things they picked up when they were at school, exaggerated stories told by returnees, and second- or third-hand advice on how to tackle life in England. Michael, for example, just like other young black men on board their ship, is secretly looking forward to having promiscuous sex with white women, having been told by his friend Bradeth that he heard "about one coloured man out there who writing home saying he be having at least three or four different white girls a week."

After a two-week voyage, Michael, Leila and Calvin finally set foot on English soil, have "nothing to declare except their accents", and eventually arrive at Victoria on the boat train from Dover with only her mother's address and some money to start a new life with. They take a taxi to the fictitious Quaxley Street only to be faced with a shabby, overcrowded house divided into several bedsits, and her mother gone again. Leila learns that she has been in hospital for some time, and during the following weeks regularly visits her there. However, the heart-to-heart she has wanted to have with her never takes place as her health rapidly deteriorates. She dies soon afterwards.

As newly arrived immigrants belonging to a visible minority who are looking for suitable accommodation and a regular income, Leila and Michael experience the kind of racism, petty and otherwise, prevalent in a city inhabited almost solely by whites which is suddenly being flooded by dark-skinned "foreigners". They fall prey to unscrupulous estate agents, and Michael soon returns to his habit of coming and going whenever he chooses to, leaving all household chores to Leila. He stops talking to his wife, is frequently drunk again and quits his job after only a few days to "go into business" together with a newly found friend of his. Also, Leila discovers a blonde hair on the shoulder of his jacket and draws her own conclusions. When she realises that they have run out of money she starts working on the buses, but on her first day she has a breakdown and is informed by the examining doctor that she is pregnant again. At the end of the novel Leila has come to realise that Michael is not going to be part of her future.

The novel is divided into five chapters of unequal length entitled "The End," "Home," "England," "The Passage," and "Winter." Basically narrated in chronological order, it does contain a series of flashbacks mainly outlining episodes of Leila's past life in the Caribbean island.

The Final Passage won the Malcolm X Prize in 1985.

== Television adaptation ==
In 1996 The Final Passage was turned into a made-for-TV movie starring Michael Cherrie, Natasha Estelle Williams, Diane Parish, Oscar James, Carmen Munroe, and Carolyn Pickles. The screenplay was written by Phillips himself; the film was directed by Peter Hall, which became his last directorial effort before dying on September 11, 2017.

== See also ==
Other novels that thematise the immigrant experience among Caribbeans in London:

- Warwick Collins: Gents (1997)
- George Lamming: The Emigrants (1954)
- Colin MacInnes: Absolute Beginners (1959)
- V. S. Naipaul: The Mimic Men (1967)
- Andrew Salkey: Escape to An Autumn Pavement (1960)
- Samuel Selvon: The Lonely Londoners (1956)
