= Tony Hippolyte =

British actor, singer (1958–2016)

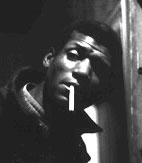
- Hippolyte in 1995
- Born: 12 May 1958; West London, England
- Died: 17 May 2016 (aged 58); Mawdesley, England
- Education: Rose Bruford College
- Occupations: Actor; director; singer

Anthony Hippolyte (12 May 1958 – 17 May 2016) was a British actor, director and singer who appeared on stage, TV, radio and film.

== Family background ==
Tony Hippolyte was born in West London to St Lucian parents. They originally lived at Silchester Terrace in Notting Hill with their relatives from the Regis family, also from St Lucia. Their house was very near the centre of the race riots that took place soon after he was born – depicted in the film Absolute Beginners (directed by Julien Temple, 1986), in which Hippolyte played jazz trumpeter Mr Cool.

== Early life and education ==
After his father returned to St Lucia with his elder brother, Hippolyte lived with his mother in a flat over an antiques shop on Fulham Road, owned by the local council. He was briefly interested in becoming a footballer (and had trials for Chelsea FC, despite being a lifelong Fulham FC supporter). However, he was spotted at an open audition for Common Stock, a community theatre project for working-class kids started by New Zealand film actor Frank Whitten. They helped him gain entrance to the Rose Bruford College of Speech and Drama where he completed a three years full-time course (Diploma in Community Theatre Arts).

He first started playing drums at college, and whilst living in South East London, he met the musicians that he played and recorded with in the Fantopowa coolective.

== Acting career ==
After leaving college in 1981, he was given a part in the Common Stock play The Second Line (with jazz band The Mike Mower Quartet). He also performed in a play called The Christmas Game, and was with Common Stock until 1982. He was then in a TV episode of Rumpole of the Bailey in 1983. He then went to act in a play called Dr. No with the Moving Parts theatre company in 1983, followed by a part in a play called Outlaw with Carib Theatre. In 1984 he joined the Half Moon Theatre company to perform in a play called Killabytes, and in the same year was given the lead part in Barrie Keeffe's play SUS at the Soho Polytechnic Theatre. Also in 1984, he was employed as one of the presenters on the award-winning ITV children's Saturday morning show, No.73, which he joined for the fourth and fifth series, playing a variety of characters, such as Eazi Target and Cardinal Richelieu in the programme's version of The Three Musketeers. He also played as an armed robber called Desmond Holt in Series 1, Episode 4 of The Bill ("Long Odds" dir. John Michael Phillips) - with his sidekick a young Sean Bean. In 1986 he acted in a Barrie Keeffe drama for BBC Radio 4 called Frozen Assets.

He was then given his first major film role, as Mr Cool in Absolute Beginners (dir. Julien Temple), based on Colin MacInnes' book of the same name. The film also starred David Bowie, James Fox and the singer Sade, and was a musical which explored the subject of the Notting Hill Race Riots which had happened in the summer of 1958, just after Hippolyte was born and living with his parents in the area. Hippolyte's character was jazz trumpeter Mr Cool, who becomes involved in the fight against the slum landlords and racist gangsters infiltrating the area.

Following the release of the film, in 1986 he was given a central role in Prospects, the 12-part ITV serial of East End life, produced by Euston Films. He was then cast as Main Man in the BBC musical film Body Contact, (1987), which also starred Timothy Spall and Joely Richardson. The film dealt with provocative subject matter such as racial violence, ghettoisation, corruption and community self-defence. In 1990, Hippolyte was given the lead role in the play Ragga, (written and directed by Amani Napthali), in the form of a courtroom drama in which a black youth, Ragamuffin, is on trial for crimes against the African people; from Haiti to Broadwater Farm. The audience is asked to act as the jury, and must decide whether Ragamuffin is guilty of causing the criminalisation of black youth or whether his actions and attitudes are justified by the long history of oppression and prejudice he has endured. Hippolyte performed at Hackney Empire and Deptford Albany, and the play was both commercially and critically successful enough to be taken to London's West End.

A year later, he played Ibo the sound engineer in the BBC musical drama film Hallelujah Anyhow starring Dona Croll (dir. Matthew Jacobs, 1991), which was the story of a strong preacher woman at a Gospel Church in London whose life is turned upside down by the re-appearance - after many years - of her son's father. He was involved in a film written and directed for Pimlico Arts and Media called Unexpected Party (1989) Hippolyte can also be seen in a couple of roles in Le Bohemian Noir et la Renaissance Del Afrique (dir. Amani Napthali, 1990). Naphtali, the theatre director, filmmaker and early affiliate of Soul II Soul artist collective, who had met Hippolyte at drama college, captures a 'renaissance moment' in the Black Arts Movement of late 1980s Camden Town in this short avant-garde film. In 1993, Hippolyte played the role of a demonic father in a play called Hunting the Dead Daughter (dir. Clare McColgan, who was later CEO of the Liverpool Capital of Culture) by playwright Nick Owen at Liverpool's Everyman Theatre. He wrote a testimonial to Tony which was read at his funeral.

== Directing work ==
After 1992, Hippolyte moved to Skelmersdale, Lancashire, to be close to his children, and started doing directing work in the theatre. He directed the play Home for the Holidays by local playwright Cheryl Martin, which was premiered in the New Works Season 1992 at the Liverpool Playhouse. In 1993 he directed Measure for Measure 2020 with the Forsooth Theatre Company, a futuristic styling of Shakespeare's play, also at the Liverpool Playhouse. He was also the assistant director and Lighting Director for Sakoba African Dance Theatre's Ebo Iye, which was a dance piece based on the effects of the slave-culture in Africa. The group was based in Hackney and toured London and South-East England.

== Musical projects ==
Tony Hippolyte was originally the drummer, and later on, the singer with the band which later recorded as Three Key Possee, and Three Key Sound. He had drummed with the reggae/rock band If'n'If on a tour of the Highlands and Islands of Scotland in 1988; and after moving to Skelmersdale, he also drummed for two local bands - Eyes in the Sky and The Worryers, who played local festivals and gigged at various venues around North West England. He was part of a collective of musicians and film makers who worked under the label fantompowa, who originally started playing together during the post-punk period, and later morphed into trip-hop and techno, via the dub and reggae sound system culture of South East London. Hippolyte sang with them from the early 1990s, and would commute between Skelmersdale and London to perform and record with fantompowa, with his vocals and lyrics on all five albums released, and on a 12" single, "Over The Horizon" Still recording and releasing tracks (now mainly techno) under this name fantompowa, a 12" single was released by Guy McAffer's RAW label (RAW046) which had Hippolyte's vocals and lyrics on the first track ("The Geezer Meets Fantompowa - feat. Mr. T") in the month before he died. Hippolyte also made two short musical films with the fantompowa collective; Bad Boy Style (1991) and The Shuffle (2015).

== Death ==
Hippolyte died at a nursing home in Mawdesley after a brief struggle with cancer on 17 May 2016, and was cremated in St. Helens on 27 May 2016.
