= Absolute Beginners (film) =

1986 film directed by Julien Temple

- Theatrical release poster
- Directed by: Julien Temple
- Written by: Richard Burridge; Christopher Wicking; Don Macpherson
- Based on: Absolute Beginners; 1959 novel by Colin MacInnes
- Produced by: Chris Brown; Stephen Woolley
- Starring: Eddie O'Connell; Patsy Kensit; David Bowie; James Fox; Ray Davies; Anita Morris; Steven Berkoff; Sade Adu
- Cinematography: Oliver Stapleton
- Edited by: Gerry Hambling
- Music by: Gil Evans
- Production companies: Goldcrest Films; Virgin Films
- Distributed by: Palace Pictures (UK); Orion Pictures (US)
- Release date: 3 April 1986
- Running time: 108 minutes
- Country: United Kingdom
- Language: English
- Budget: £8.4 million
- Box office: £1.8 million

Absolute Beginners is a 1986 British musical film adapted from Colin MacInnes' book about life in late 1950s London, directed by Julien Temple. The film stars Eddie O' Connell, Patsy Kensit, James Fox, Edward Tudor-Pole, Anita Morris, and David Bowie, with featured appearances by Sade Adu, Ray Davies, and Steven Berkoff. It was screened out of competition at the 1986 Cannes Film Festival. It received coverage in the British media but was panned by critics and became a box office failure, although modern reviews have been more favourable. Bowie's theme song was very popular in the UK, spending nine weeks on the charts and peaking at number two. The commercial failure of Absolute Beginners and two other films is blamed for the collapse of British film studio Goldcrest Films and for Virgin Films withdrawing from production.

== Plot ==
Taking place in 1958, popular culture in London is transforming from 1950s jazz to a new generation on the verge of the rock and roll 1960s. Young photographer Colin is in love with aspiring fashion designer Suzette. Colin aims to be an artist with integrity. Suzette's boss, famous designer Henley of Mayfair, takes advantage of her forward-thinking designs to boost his own image.

Colin lives in the poor, ethnically diverse neighbourhood of Notting Hill. To make money, he gets a job with music producer Harry Charms, taking photos of new teen idol Baby Boom. Despite Colin getting commercial photography work, Suzette breaks up with him. She explains that she wants a successful and luxurious life, and won't settle for less ("Having It All"). Colin is initially despondent, but believes she'll eventually come back to him.

Colin learns that Suzette will be at a party hosted by gossip columnist Dido Lament, and so he attends. He learns Suzette plans to marry the middle-aged, homosexual Henley for her career ("Selling Out"). Colin also meets advertising mogul Vendice Partners at the party.

Meanwhile, the Teddy Boy subculture is increasingly hostile towards Black residents in London, spurred by the recent rise in immigration. The White Defence League, led by the Fanatic, preaches fascist politics and is vehemently against the increasing ethnic diversity of London. Colin despises this racist ideology.

Partners brings Colin to his advertising agency, where he shows off plans for the White Housing Development. Partners offers Colin a position as an advertisement photographer. While hesitant at first, Colin takes the job in the hopes that money may help him win back Suzette ("That's Motivation").

Henley and Suzette marry, but she is deeply unhappy. Colin, Dido, and Charms go on the TV show Searchlight. Dido gropes Colin, prompting him to have an outbust and rail against the elder generation trying to exploit teenagers. Later, at a jazz club, Colin is commended for his honesty on television. However, he's upset when he sees a newspaper headline about Suzette's wedding ("Killer Blow").

Racial violence intensifies in the area. Colin's Black friend, Mr. Cool, informs him that the racists are becoming more organized and dangerous. Colin discovers that the new White Housing Development is a scheme between Partners and Henley to "redevelop" the "West 11." Colin sends incriminating photos to Dido in an attempt to reveal the plan, but she's in cahoots with Partners and is no help.

Colin witnesses the 1958 Notting Hill race riots ("Riot City"). His pleas for peace are ignored. The police eventually arrive and stop the violence. Colin finds Suzette and they flee a fire set by the WDL. Mr. Cool has a fight with Flikker and wins. There is celebratory dancing in the street as rain puts out the fires. Colin and Suzette go back to his flat and have sex. He throws her wedding ring out the window.

== Cast ==
- Eddie O'Connell as Colin
- Patsy Kensit as Crepe Suzette
- James Fox as Henley of Mayfair
- David Bowie as Vendice Partners
- Edward Tudor-Pole as Ed the Ted
- Anita Morris as Dido Lament
- Graham Fletcher-Cook as Wizard
- Tony Hippolyte as Mr. Cool
- Bruce Payne as Flikker
- Paul Rhys as Dean Swift
- Lionel Blair as Harry Charms
- Eve Ferret as Big Jill
- Ray Davies as Arthur
- Sade as Athene Duncannon
- Mandy Rice-Davies as Mum
- Julian Firth as The Misery Kid
- Alan Freeman as Call-Me-Cobber
- Steven Berkoff as The Fanatic
- Chris Pitt as Baby Boom
- Gary Beadle as Johnny Wonder
- Robbie Coltrane as Mario
- Amanda Powell as Dorita
- Carmen Ejogo as Carmen
- Ronald Fraser as Amberley Drove
- Joe McKenna as Fabulous Hoplite
- Irene Handl as Mrs. Larkin
- Peter-Hugo Daly as Vern
- Sylvia Syms as Cynthia Eve
- Slim Gaillard as Lloyd
- Eric Sykes as Arcade Worker

== Production ==
The novel was admired by Don MacPherson, a magazine editor who was friends with Julien Temple, then best known for directing music videos. MacPherson, Temple and Temple's business partner Michael Hamlyn agreed to try to turn Absolute Beginners into a film. MacPherson wrote the first draft, but this was not well received. Richard Burridge wrote a draft which was more positively received. The movie was going to be made at Virgin Films. Goldcrest Films also became involved as did Steve Woolley's Palace Flms.

According to a history of Palace Pictures "The main reason for Palace's commitment to Temple's film... was the tremendous depth of Powell's and Woolley's shared ambition. Here was a film that was clearly going to be a huge event, and Palace's partners were equally determined to be at the forefront of such a national spectacle. To say 'No' to Absolute Beginners was unthinkable."

Temple later admitted "MacInnes's book has a very flawed narrative to my mind, and is very hard to adapt. It lacks drive in terms of plot, and largely concerns the central characters views on the world, about jazz, pop stars, television, advertising and so on."

Palace covered development costs. Under the arrangement between Palace and Goldcrest, the latter would provide 60% of the budget if Palace could find the other 40%. Palace raised this from Orion Pictures in the US. Eventually $2.5 million of the film's budget came from Orion and £2.5 million from Goldcrest. Goldcrest guaranteed any cost overruns

Christopher Wicking was hired to do a version of the script which he said "had some sort of propulsion from one scene to the next". He says the script helped raise American finance but then Julien Temple disregarded a lot of Wicking's ideas. Wicking also says the filmmakers could never decide if the musical numbers should advance the story or illustrate something about the characters at the time.

Terry Johnson did a rewrite of the script. According to Sandy Lieberson of Goldcrest the script "was never nailed down, and it kept being edited and not edited during the whole run-up to production and during the production itself."

Eddie O'Connell and Patsy Kensit were relative unknowns when cast for the film and, according to Julien Temple in a 2016 interview (included on the re-released DVD/Blu-Ray), neither got on with each other pretty well. Temple wanted to include musicians that represented music from the 1950s through to the 1980s with many of his contacts being from music videos whom he had directed. Ed Tudor-Pole (playing teddyboy 'Ed The Ted') had met Temple through his work on The Great Rock 'N' Roll Swindle. Ray Davies, Sade and David Bowie were recruited after Temple had directed music videos for them ("Predictable" for Davies' group The Kinks in 1981, "Hang On to Your Love" and "Smooth Operator" for Sade in 1984 and the short film Jazzin' for Blue Jean for Bowie also in 1984). Broadway star Anita Morris had appeared in Temple's promo for The Rolling Stones' "She Was Hot" whilst Eve Ferret had co-starred as a receptionist in Jazzin' for Blue Jean.

In the aforementioned 2016 interview, producer Stephen Woolley recalled the financial challenges that were facing film company Goldcrest at the time- Absolute Beginners was made around the same time as Hugh Hudson's Revolution (starring Al Pacino) and Roland Joffé's The Mission (starring Robert De Niro and Jeremy Irons); as both films were seen to be more high profile due to their relatively higher budgets and more noted filmstars, Absolute Beginners did not get as much financial support the other two films. All three films would fail at the box office leading to Goldcrest's eventual collapse.

The cost of the film blew out during filming, rising from £6 million to £8.6 million. Alan Marshall was hired to oversee the project through to completion. Goldcrest wound up having to invest £5 million.

== Release ==
Angus Finney, in his history of Palace Films, wrote the movie "is perhaps best remembered as an extraordinary British marketing phenomenon. An enormous party was held by Palace inside the railings of Leicester Square. Newspapers, magazines, cartoons, radio chat shows, a South Bank television special, and all other ways of promoting the movie were pursued relentlessly. Phil Symes and Angie Errigo worked long hours to ensure the film maximum publicity coverage." According to Jack Eberts of Goldcrest "probably no film has been so over-promoted in the history of the British film business. The expectations of the audience were raised to such heights that the picture could only suffer by comparison."

Whilst the critical reviews in the UK were fairly disappointing, the box office performed respectably well whilst the reverse was true in America, where good reviews by critics were not matched by the volume of ticket sales. Two noted fans of the film were Michael and Janet Jackson, leading to Temple directing Janet's promo videos for "When I Think Of You" and "Alright" which emulate some of the visual style of Absolute Beginners. Other musicians like Bowie, Billy Idol, Whitney Houston and Blur (amongst others) would keep Temple's career in music video directing ongoing.

The film had its premiere at the Leicester Square Theatre on 3 April 1986 attended by Princess Anne. It opened to the public the following day at the theatre and at the Odeon Marble Arch before expanding nationwide on 11 April.

== Reception ==
=== Critical response ===
The New York Times film critic Caryn James remarked upon the "unevenness" of Temple's adaptation and its "erratic" results. Pauline Kael declared that the music was "peculiarly unlyrical and ephemeral". Jeremy Allen in The Guardian praised Bowie's theme song but described the film as "an overbudget turkey of huge proportions". Corey K. Creekmur stated in The International Film Musical that the film "failed to deliver on the critical expectations surrounding it", although it remained "a deeply interesting, if flawed, attempt to harness the contemporary musical in the services of politics and social equality".

Alex Stewart reviewed Absolute Beginners for White Dwarf #79, and stated that "It's glossy, slick and superficial, with a couple of nods towards Social Significance which stand out almost as awkwardly as the stumps of the subplots that ended up on the cutting-room floor. On the other hand the singing and dancing are quite nice, the climax looks uncannily like Quatermass and the Pit set to music, and the grossly over-hyped Patsy Kensit duly meets a most satisfying nemesis by turning in a performance that would have disgraced an episode of Thunderbirds."

Absolute Beginners currently holds a 73% rating on Rotten Tomatoes, based on 11 reviews. Audiences polled by CinemaScore gave the film an average grade of "B+" on an A+ to F scale.

Filmink argued "there's so much great stuff and talent on display and it's a lot of fun. It just cost far, far too much money (like, four times what it needed to), it screws up its central love story, and had a male lead actor who couldn't sing, dance or act."

=== Box office ===
The film earned £500,000 in rentals in the UK and $300,000 in the US. Goldcrest Films invested £4,680,000 in the film and received £1,859,000 back, losing £2,821,000.

According to Jake Eberts "The whole exercise had been a disaster. At every stage, from the original conception, through the script, the pre-production, production and post-production, to the marketing and distribution. Absolute Beginners was an object lesson in how not to produce a movie."

== Soundtrack ==
Absolute Beginners: The Original Motion Picture Soundtrack was concurrently released to promote the film, and the musical score was composed by Gil Evans. David Bowie's title track, Ray Davies' "Quiet Life", and the Style Council's "Have You Ever Had It Blue?" were released as singles. Abridged versions of the LP were released featuring only sides one and two, and CD versions excised the tracks "Absolute Beginners (Slight Refrain)," "Landlords and Tenants", "Santa Lucia". and "Cool Napoli".

=== Track listing ===
Side one
No.	Title	Writer(s)	Artist	Length
1.	"Absolute Beginners"	David Bowie	David Bowie	7:58
2.	"Killer Blow"	Sade Adu, Simon Booth, Larry Stabbins	Sade	4:34
3.	"Have You Ever Had It Blue?"	Paul Weller	The Style Council	5:36
4.	"Quiet Life"	Ray Davies	Ray Davies	2:55
5.	"Va Va Voom"	Gil Evans	Gil Evans	3:26

Side two
No.	Title	Writer(s)	Artist	Length
1.	"That's Motivation"	Bowie	David Bowie	4:14
2.	"Having It All"	Geoff Beauchamp, Alex Godson, Patsy Kensit	Eighth Wonder featuring Patsy Kensit	3:06
3.	"Rodrigo Bay"	Booth, Stabbins	Working Week	3:27
4.	"Selling Out"	Slim Gaillard, Tot Taylor, Julien Temple	Slim Gaillard	3:34
5.	"Riot City"	Jerry Dammers	Jerry Dammers	8:28

Side three
No.	Title	Writer(s)	Artist	Length
1.	"Boogie Stop Shuffle (Rough and the Smooth)"	Charles Mingus	Gil Evans	3:01
2.	"Ted Ain't Dead"	Edward Tudor-Pole, Temple	Tenpole Tudor	2:35
3.	"Volare (Nel Blu Dipinto Di Blu)"	Franco Migliacci, Domenico Modugno	David Bowie	3:13
4.	"Napoli"	Clive Langer, Temple	Clive Langer	4:09
5.	"Little Cat (You Never Had It So Good)"	Nick Lowe	Jonas	2:19
6.	"Absolute Beginners (Slight Refrain)"	Bowie	Gil Evans	0:38

Side four
No.	Title	Writer(s)	Artist	Length
1.	"Better Git It in Your Soul (The Hot and the Cold)"	Mingus	Gil Evans	1:49
2.	"Landlords and Tenants"	Laurel Aitken	Laurel Aitken	2:46
3.	"Santa Lucia"	Ekow Abban	Ekow Abban	3:49
4.	"Cool Napoli"	Langer, Temple	Gil Evans	2:01
5.	"So What? (Lyric Version)"	Smiley Culture	Miles Davis, Smiley Culture	4:18
6.	"Absolute Beginners (Refrain)"	Bowie	Gil Evans	1:37

=== Charts ===
Сhart performance for Absolute Beginners
Chart (1986)	Peak position
Australian Albums (Kent Music Report)	85
Austrian Albums (Ö3 Austria)	6
Dutch Albums (Album Top 100)	29
Finnish Albums (Suomen virallinen lista)	38
German Albums (Offizielle Top 100)	36
Swedish Albums (Sverigetopplistan)	45
Swiss Albums (Schweizer Hitparade)	10
UK Albums (Official Charts)	19

== Bibliography ==
- Finney, Angus (1997). The egos have landed : the rise and fall of Palace Pictures.
- Walker, Alexander (2005). Icons in the Fire: The Rise and Fall of Practically Everyone in the British Film Industry 1984-2000. Orion Books.
