= Majbritt Morrison =

Swedish-born assault victim (1932–2006)

- Born: Maj-Britt V. Sandberg; 1932; Sweden
- Died: 7 February 2006 (aged 72–73); London, England
- Occupation: Author

Maj-Britt V. Morrison (née Sandberg; 1932 – 7 February 2006) was a Swedish woman who was known for being the victim of an assault that sparked the 1958 Notting Hill race riots which escalated from there, and as the author of the best-seller Jungle West 11.

== Background ==
Maj-Britt V. Sandberg was born in Sweden in 1932. In 1955, while visiting the UK with a group of students, she met Raymond Morrison, a Jamaican, and later married him, in Kensington in 1958.

== Incident ==
The night before the Notting Hill race riots, she was outside Latimer Road tube station, arguing with her husband. The following day on Saturday, 30 August 1958, while leaving a blues dance, she was seen by a gang of white youths the following day who remembered her. They followed her, throwing milk bottles and hurling racist abuse. One of the slurs that were thrown at her was "Black man's trollop". She was also hit in the back with an iron bar and somebody from the mob called out: "Kill her!"

While standing her ground, she was ordered by the police to go inside. She refused, and she was arrested. Meanwhile, the mob carried on down the road, smashing windows and would have attacked a house party that was organised by Count Suckle who was one of the first sound system operators in Great Britain. Count Suckle and his friends were escorted out of the neighbourhood.

== After the riots ==
On 1 September 1958, having been charged with obstruction during the riots, Majbritt Morrison was photographed along with her husband leaving the West London Police Court. She was scheduled to have a hearing at the Tower Hill Court a few days from then.

Years later in the 1970s, Raymond Morrison worked in the music business and released a few reggae singles on the Hawk Records label as Ray Morrison or with a friend, Tamara, performing as Ram and Tam. He also managed a club in Swiss Cottage during the 1970s.

Maj-Britt Morrison died in London on 7 February 2006.

== Released work ==
Her book Jungle West 11 was first published in the UK by Tandem Books in 1964. This was her account of the events relating to the Notting Hill Riots.
