= Dancing in the Dark (novel) =

2005 novel by Caryl Phillips

- First edition (publ. Secker & Warburg)
- Author: Caryl Phillips
- Language: English
- Genre: Theatre-fiction
- Publisher: London, UK: Secker & Warburg
- Publication date: 2005
- Publication place: United Kingdom
- Media type: Print
- Preceded by: A Distant Shore
- Followed by: Foreigners: Three English Lives

Dancing in the Dark is a 2005 novel by Kittitian-British writer Caryl Phillips that won the PEN/Beyond Margins Award in 2006. The novel was first published in London by Secker & Warburg.

Dancing in the Dark reimagines the life of Bert Williams (1874—1922), the first black entertainer in the U.S. to achieve the highest levels of fame and fortune, while darkening his skin with burnt cork and "playing the dim-witted 'coon' on Broadway and elsewhere", a story that allows the author to deal with issues of race, and identity that he also addressed in his novel A Distant Shore, as reviewer Tabish Khair notes: "Dancing in the Dark explores the particular tensions of assuming a false identity which, in a racist society, would be considered the 'true' identity of the player. This catches the performer in the double bind of using the actor's art to confirm prejudices, which then blind their audiences to that art." The story also deals with "the perils of self-invention, that have long plagued American culture".
