= South London =

London south of the River Thames, in England

- London, south of the Thames
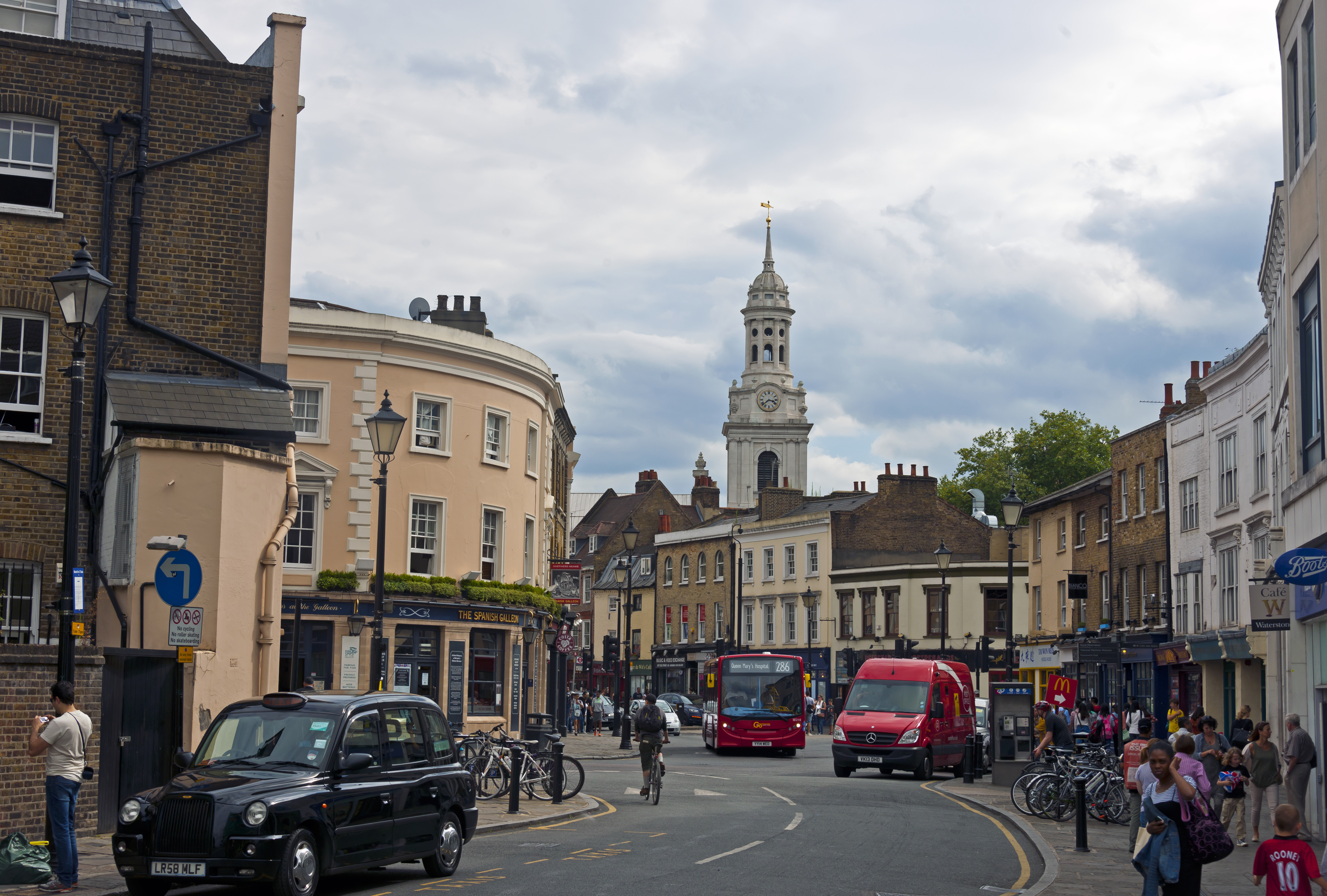
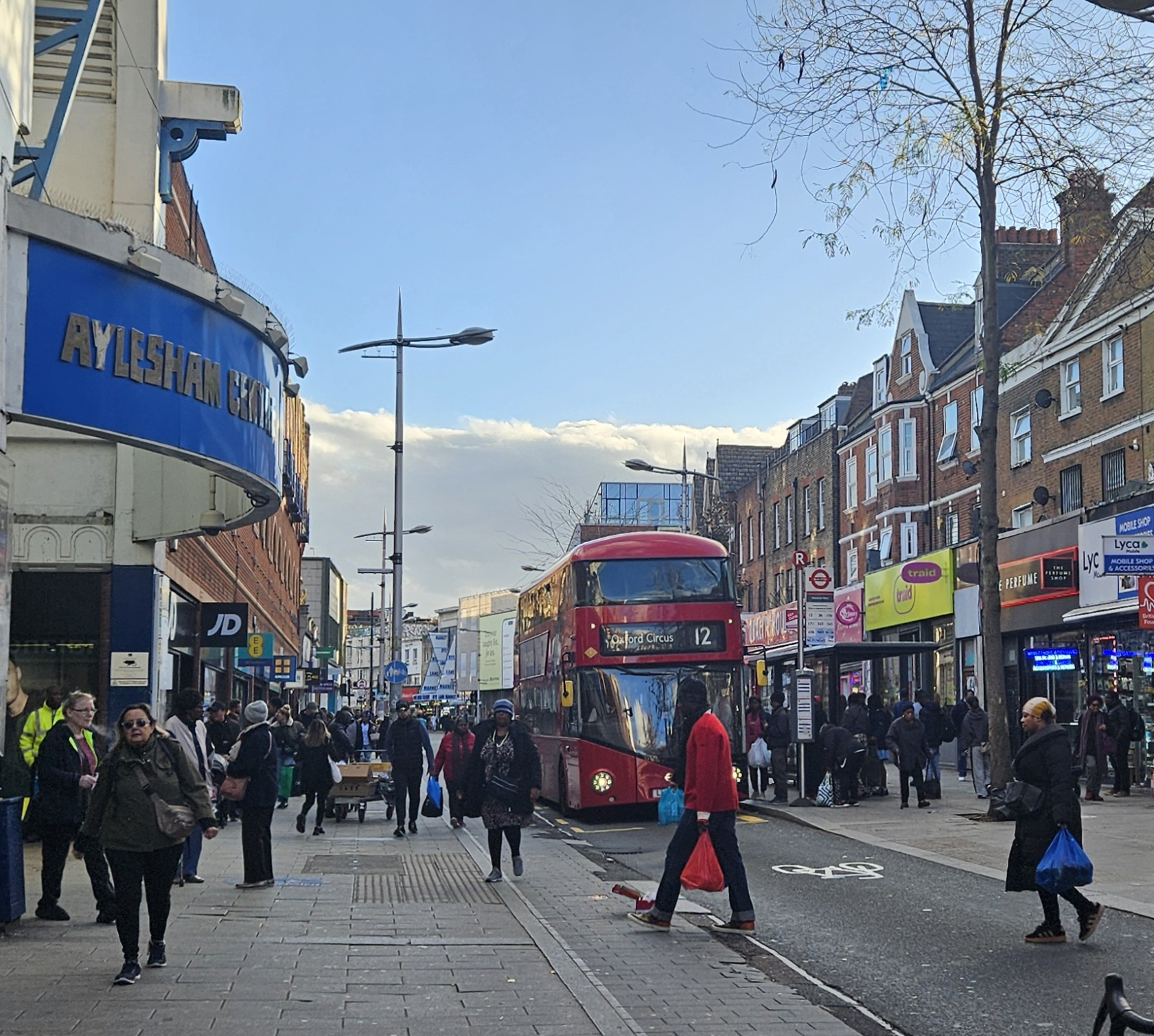
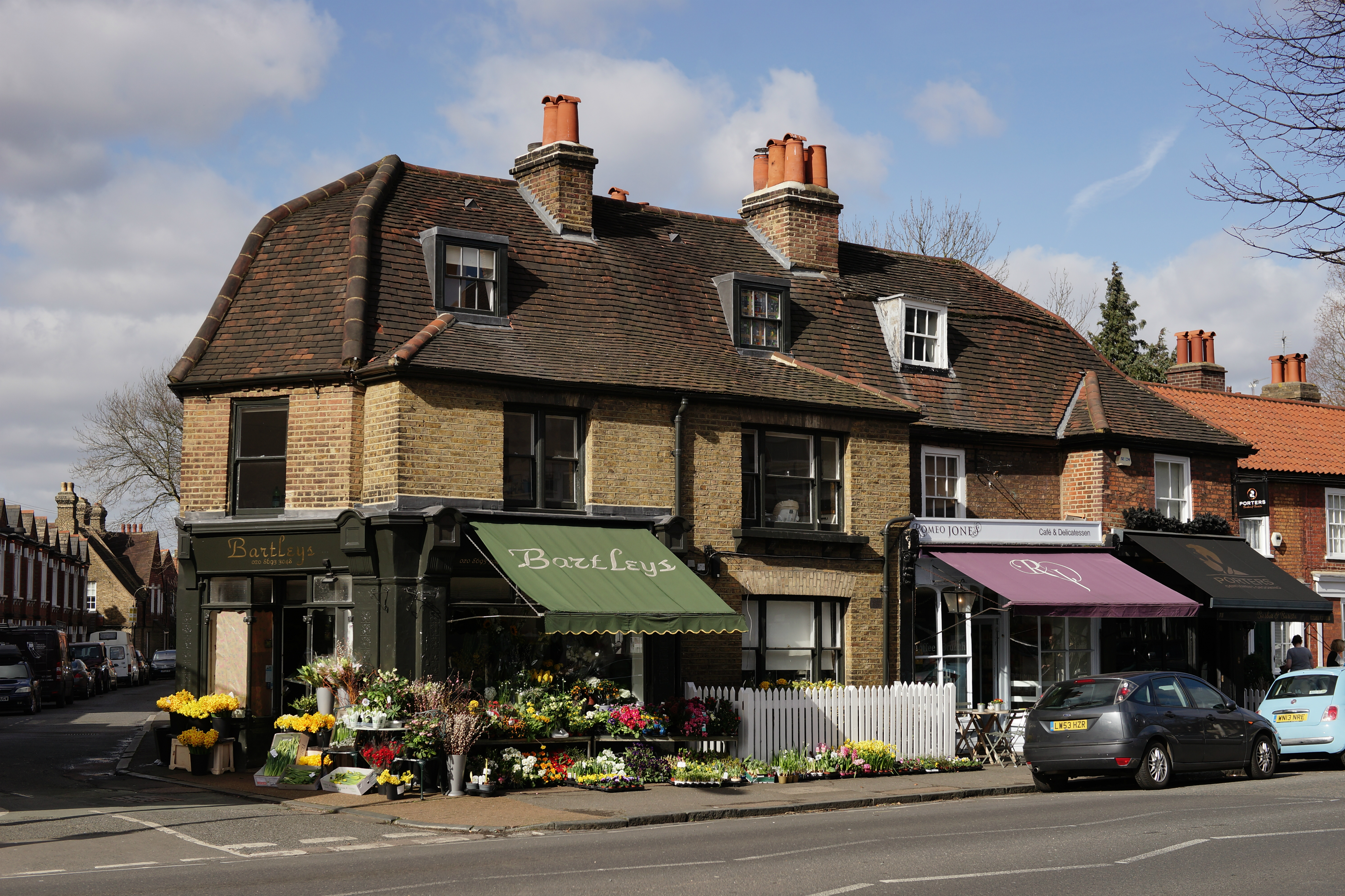
- Southwark Elephant and Castle Greenwich Brixton Richmond Peckham Dulwich Vauxhall
- Coordinates: 51.45°N 0.1°W
- Sovereign state: United Kingdom
- Country: England
- Region: London
- Established: 2008

Area
  - Total: 249.34 sq mi (645.78 km^{2})

Population
  - Total: 2,835,200
  - Density: 11,371/sq mi (4,390.3/km^{2})

South London is the southern subregion of London, England, situated primarily south of the River Thames. Spanning a diverse mix of dense inner-city districts, historic market towns, royal parks, and leafy suburbs, the region comprises the boroughs, in whole or in part, of Bexley, Bromley, Croydon, Greenwich, Kingston, Lambeth, Lewisham, Merton, Richmond, Southwark, Sutton and Wandsworth.

Historically distinct from the capital's northern core, South London originally emerged from Southwark, first recorded as Suthriganaweorc, meaning 'fort of the men of Surrey'. Serving as a vital southern bridgehead opposite the City of London since the Roman era, Southwark developed outside the strict jurisdiction of the City authorities, becoming a hub for coaching inns, theatres—most notably Shakespeare's Globe—and trade. As river crossings multiplied in the 18th and 19th centuries and the railways expanded rapidly, London extended southwards into the historic counties of northern Surrey and western Kent, absorbing villages and market towns into the expanding metropolis before they were formally incorporated into Greater London in 1965.

Across the centuries, South London has played a central role in shaping Britain’s maritime, industrial, scientific, and cultural identity. Along the Thames, the royal dockyards and naval institutions of Greenwich, Deptford, and Woolwich anchored British maritime power, while the Royal Observatory, Greenwich established the Prime Meridian and Greenwich Mean Time (GMT). In the 20th century, Croydon Airport served as Britain’s primary international airport and pioneered modern air traffic control. Culturally and socially, the subregion has been a major engine of British arts, sport, and diversity: it is home to the Southbank Centre, the Tate Modern, the Wimbledon Championships, and The Oval, and has been pivotal to Black British history—particularly through the Windrush generation in Brixton—as well as the development of British popular music, from punk rock and dub reggae to UK garage, grime, and UK drill.

Long characterised by a lower density of London Underground stations compared to North London—relying instead on an extensive suburban rail and Overground network—the subregion has experienced rapid demographic, cultural, and economic transformation in the 21st century. Driven by major urban regeneration schemes (such as Nine Elms, Battersea Power Station, Elephant and Castle, and Canada Water), transport expansions including the Northern line extension to Battersea and the Elizabeth line in Woolwich, and thriving creative districts in neighbourhoods like Peckham and Deptford, South London has increasingly become a focal point for residential development, cultural investment, and population growth in the capital.

== Emergence and growth ==
South London began at Southwark at the southern end of London Bridge, the first permanent crossing over the River Thames. The early development of the area was a direct result of the existence and location of the bridge.

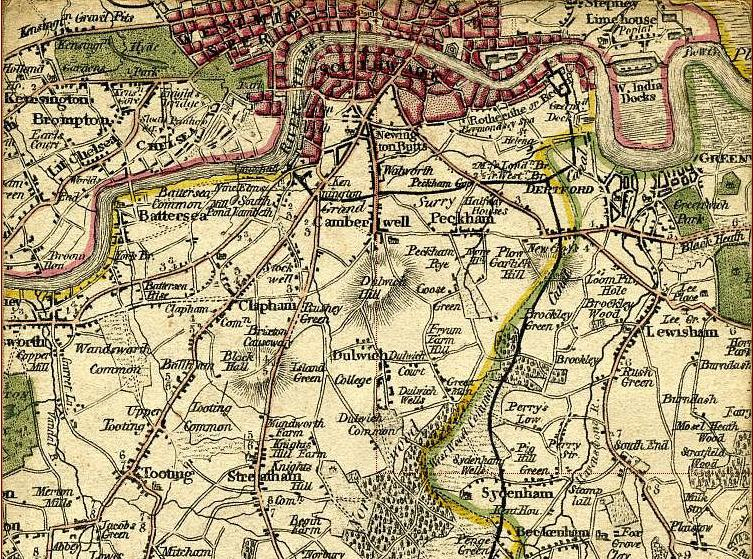
South of London in 1800. The border between Surrey and Kent is shown running south from Deptford, through Sydenham

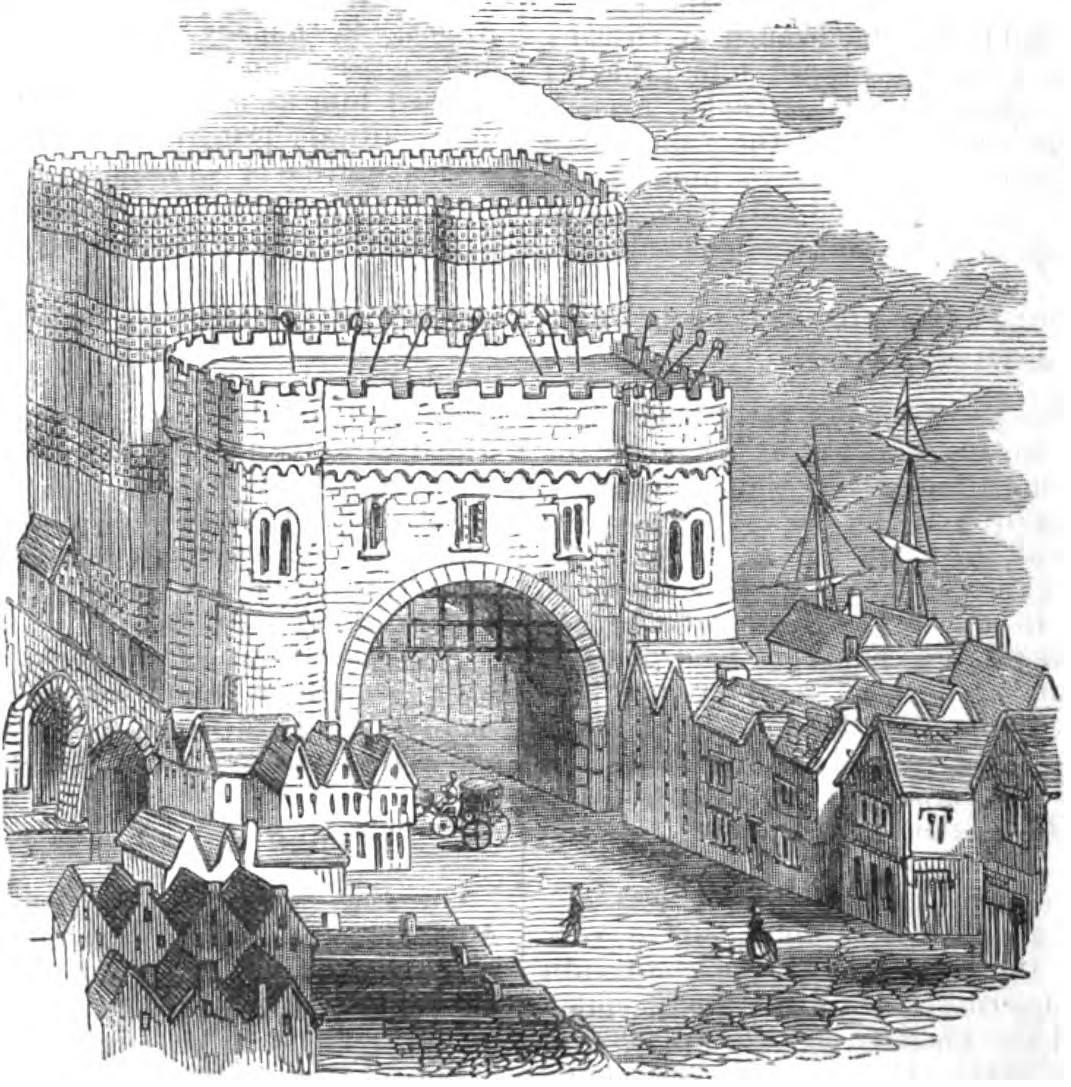
The heads of traitors were displayed on spikes, on the southern gatehouse of London Bridge

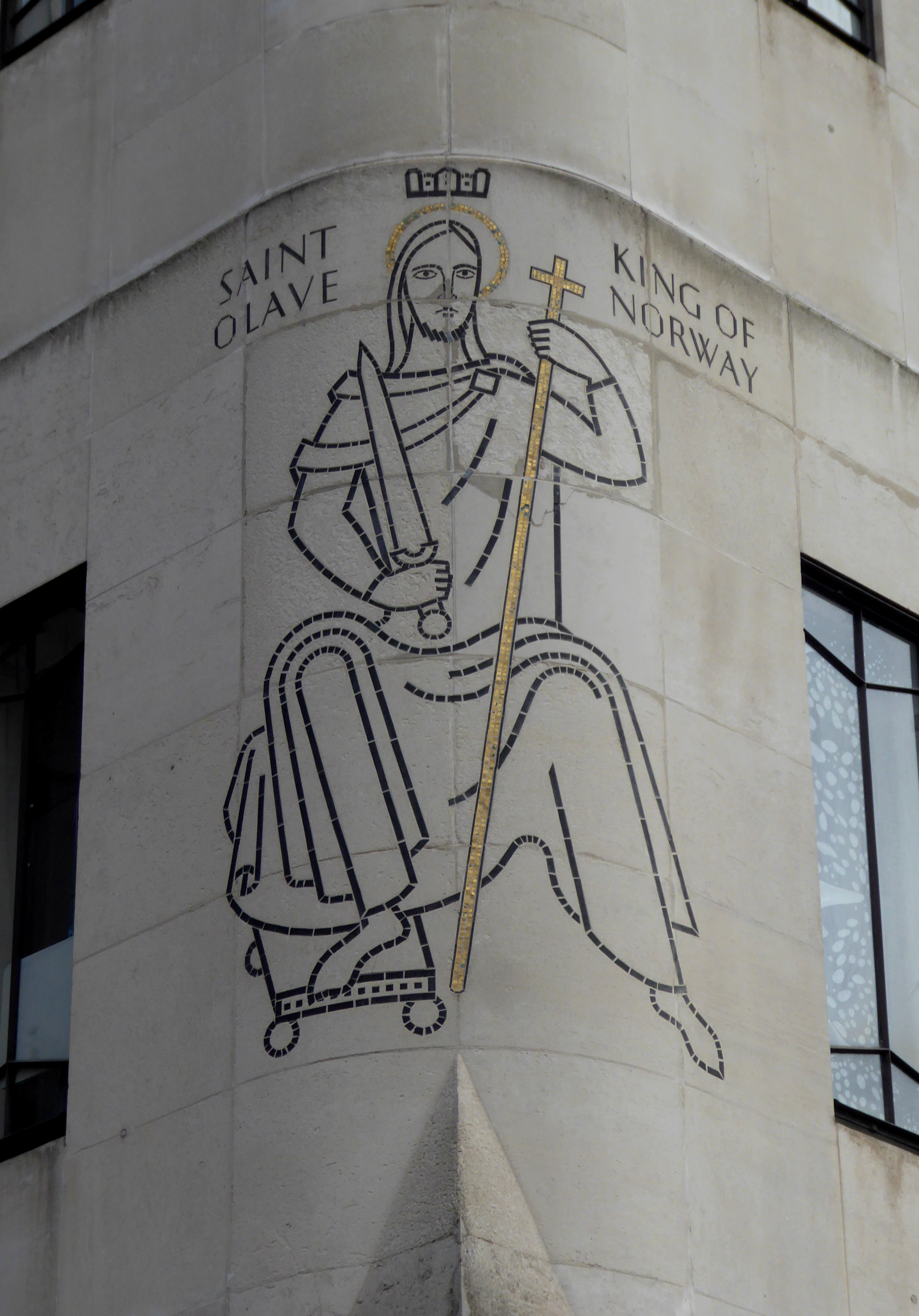
St Olaf's House, Southwark. Olaf, later St Olaf, helped the English retake London Bridge from his fellow Norsemen.

Southwark was first known as Suthriganaweorc, the fortress of the men of Surrey, mentioned in the Burghal Hidage as part of military system created by Alfred the Great to defeat the Great Heathen Army of the Vikings. Southwark was also known as the Borough due to its being an incorporated (nationally represented) Borough from 1295. From 1550 to 1899 it was administered as part of the City of London as the ward of Bridge Without.

In 1720, John Strype's 'Survey of London' described Southwark as one of the then four distinct areas of London; in it he describes the City of London, Westminster (West London), Southwark (South London), and 'That Part Beyond the Tower' (East London). The area now usually referred to as North London developed later. As late as the mid-18th century, there were no other bridges crossing the river and hence urban growth was considerably slower in the south than in areas north of the Thames.

The opening of Westminster Bridge and other subsequent bridges to the west encouraged growth in the south-west, but only Tower Bridge was built to the east of London Bridge, so south-east London grew more slowly, at least until the Surrey Commercial Docks were built.

The development of a dense network of railway lines in the mid-nineteenth century significantly accelerated growth. The County of London was formed in 1899, which incorporated these boroughs south of the river: Wandsworth, Lambeth, Battersea, Camberwell, Southwark, Bermondsey, Deptford, Lewisham, Greenwich and Woolwich. During the first half of the 20th century, towns in the Home Counties such as Kingston, Croydon and Bromley gradually coalesced with South London, until Greater London was formed in 1965.

== Transport ==
A significant feature of south London's economic geography is that while there are more than thirty bridges linking the area with West London and the City, there is only one, Tower Bridge, linking the area with East London.

Very little of London's underground rail network lies south of the river, largely due to the challenging geology; however, 21st-century technology makes tunnelling much cheaper (though stations are still expensive) and this may lead to an improved underground provision in south London with the Crossrail 2 line proposed alongside extensions to the Northern and Bakerloo Lines.

South London contains an extensive overground rail network and all of London's trams operate within the area.

== List of boroughs ==
The 12 boroughs included, in whole or part are:

London borough	Postcode areas	2008 sub-region	London Assembly	Historic county	Inner London/ Outer London
Bexley	DA, SE	South East	Bexley and Bromley	Kent	Outer London
Bromley	BR, DA, SE, TN, CR	South East	Bexley and Bromley	Kent	Outer London
Croydon	CR, SE, SW, BR	South West	Croydon and Sutton	Surrey	Outer London
Greenwich	SE, DA, BR	South East	Greenwich and Lewisham	Kent	Inner London (Outer London for statistics)
Kingston	KT, SW,	South West	South West	Surrey	Outer London
Lambeth	SE, SW	South East	Lambeth and Southwark	Surrey	Inner London
Lewisham	SE, BR	South East	Greenwich and Lewisham	Kent	Inner London
Merton	CR, SM, SW, KT	South West	Merton and Wandsworth	Surrey	Outer London
Richmond (part)	TW,SW	South West	South West	Surrey	Outer London
Southwark	SE	South East	Lambeth and Southwark	Surrey	Inner London
Sutton	SM, KT,	South West	Croydon and Sutton	Surrey	Outer London
Wandsworth	SW	South West	Merton and Wandsworth	Surrey	Inner London

A small area of land, on which the southern end of Blackfriars Bridge stands, is not part of Southwark. It forms part of the City of London, a sui generis local authority which is mainly located north of the Thames.

== Formal use ==
The term 'south London' has been used for a variety of formal purposes with the boundaries defined according to the purposes of the designation.

=== Constituency review, 2017 ===
In 2017 the government asked the Boundary Commission for England to reconsider the boundaries of parliamentary constituencies. The commission's study was to start with existing regions of England and then group the local authorities within that area into sub-regions for further sub-division. The south London sub-region included the 11 boroughs which lay south of the river, plus the parts of cross-river Richmond upon Thames that did so.

An earlier 2013 study, whose recommendations were not adopted, took a different approach by including all of Richmond in its south London sub-region.

=== Sub-region policy ===
For the purposes of progress reporting on the London Plan, there was a south London sub-region in operation from 2004 to 2008 consisting of Bromley, Croydon, Kingston, Merton, Richmond and Sutton. In 2001 this area had a population of 1,329,000. This definition is used by organisations such as Connexions.

Between 2008 and 2011 it was replaced with a South East sub-region consisting of Southwark, Lewisham, Greenwich, Bexley and Bromley and a South West sub-region consisting of Croydon, Kingston, Lambeth, Merton, Sutton, Richmond and Wandsworth.

In 2011 a new south London region was created consisting of Bromley, Croydon, the Royal Borough of Kingston upon Thames, Richmond upon Thames, Merton, Sutton, Wandsworth, Bexley, Greenwich and Lewisham.

== Climate ==
South London has, like other parts of London and the UK in general, a temperate maritime climate according to the Köppen climate classification system. Three Met Office weather stations currently collect climate data south of the river: Kew, Hampton, and Kenley Airfield, on the southern edge of the urban area. Long-term climate observations dating back to 1763 are available for Greenwich, although observations ceased there in 2003.

Temperatures increase towards the Thames, firstly because of the urban warming effect of the surrounding area, and secondly due to altitude decreasing towards the river, meaning the southern margins of south London are often a couple of degrees cooler than those areas adjacent to the Thames. Often snow can be seen to lie on the North Downs near Croydon when central London is snow-free.

The record high temperature at Greenwich is 37.5 °C (99.5 °F) recorded during August 2003. Sunshine is notably lower than other London area weather stations (by about 50–100 hours a year), suggesting Greenwich may be a fog trap in winter, and that the hillier land to the south may obscure early morning and late evening sunshine.

The highest temperature recorded across south London was 38.1 °C (100.6 °F) on the same occasion at Kew Gardens. Although the Met Office accepts a higher reading from Brogdale in Kent, many have questioned the accuracy of this and regard the Kew reading as the most reliable highest UK temperature reading.

Climate data for Greenwich 7m asl 1971–2000,
Month	Jan	Feb	Mar	Apr	May	Jun	Jul	Aug	Sep	Oct	Nov	Dec	Year
Mean daily maximum °C (°F)	7.9 (46.2)	8.2 (46.8)	10.9 (51.6)	13.3 (55.9)	17.2 (63.0)	20.2 (68.4)	22.8 (73.0)	22.6 (72.7)	19.3 (66.7)	15.2 (59.4)	10.9 (51.6)	8.8 (47.8)	14.8 (58.6)
Mean daily minimum °C (°F)	2.4 (36.3)	2.2 (36.0)	3.8 (38.8)	5.2 (41.4)	8.0 (46.4)	11.1 (52.0)	13.6 (56.5)	13.3 (55.9)	10.9 (51.6)	8.0 (46.4)	4.8 (40.6)	3.3 (37.9)	7.2 (45.0)
Average precipitation mm (inches)	51.9 (2.04)	34.0 (1.34)	42.0 (1.65)	45.2 (1.78)	47.2 (1.86)	53.0 (2.09)	38.3 (1.51)	47.3 (1.86)	56.9 (2.24)	61.5 (2.42)	52.3 (2.06)	54.0 (2.13)	583.6 (22.98)
Mean monthly sunshine hours	45.9	66.1	103.2	147.0	185.4	180.6	190.3	194.4	139.2	109.7	60.6	37.8	1,461
Source: MetOffice

== Associated organisations ==
- South London Gallery
- South London Botanical Institute
- South London Press
- South London Radio
- South London Storm
- South London Theatre

== See also ==
- Central London
- East London
- Inner London
- North London
- Outer London
- South Bank
- South London derby
- West London
