= Jungle West 11 =

1964 book by Majbritt Morrison

- Author: Majbritt Morrison
- Language: English
- Genre: Non fiction
- Publisher: Tandem Books
- Publication date: 1964
- Publication place: United Kingdom
- Media type: Print (hardback & paperback)

Jungle West 11 is a 1964 book by Majbritt Morrison. The book was published through Tandem Books and focused on Morrison's life and her account of the Notting Hill race riots, specifically the attack on her on Blechynden Street.

The book has seen multiple publications and was re-published in the Netherlands in 2008, 44 years after its first printing in 1964.

== Reaction to the book ==
Novelist Stewart Home questioned the validity of the claims in the book, saying: "While Morrison appears to have existed she was probably unable to produce a convincing account of her personal experiences because she received too much useful advice about content from an editor who was keen to help her write a best seller."

== Publications ==
- Jungle West 11, Tandem Books, UK - 1964
- Jungle West 11 (reprint), London, 1964 (as Majbritt Viola Morrison)
- Jungle West 11 mijn leven als licht meisje in Londen, De Arbeiderspers, Netherlands - 1966
- Jungle West 11, Award Books - A271S K - United States - 1967
- Jungle West 11, Standaard - ISBN 978-90-8691-040-3. - 2008
