= Caryl Phillips =

Kittitian-British novelist (b. 1958)

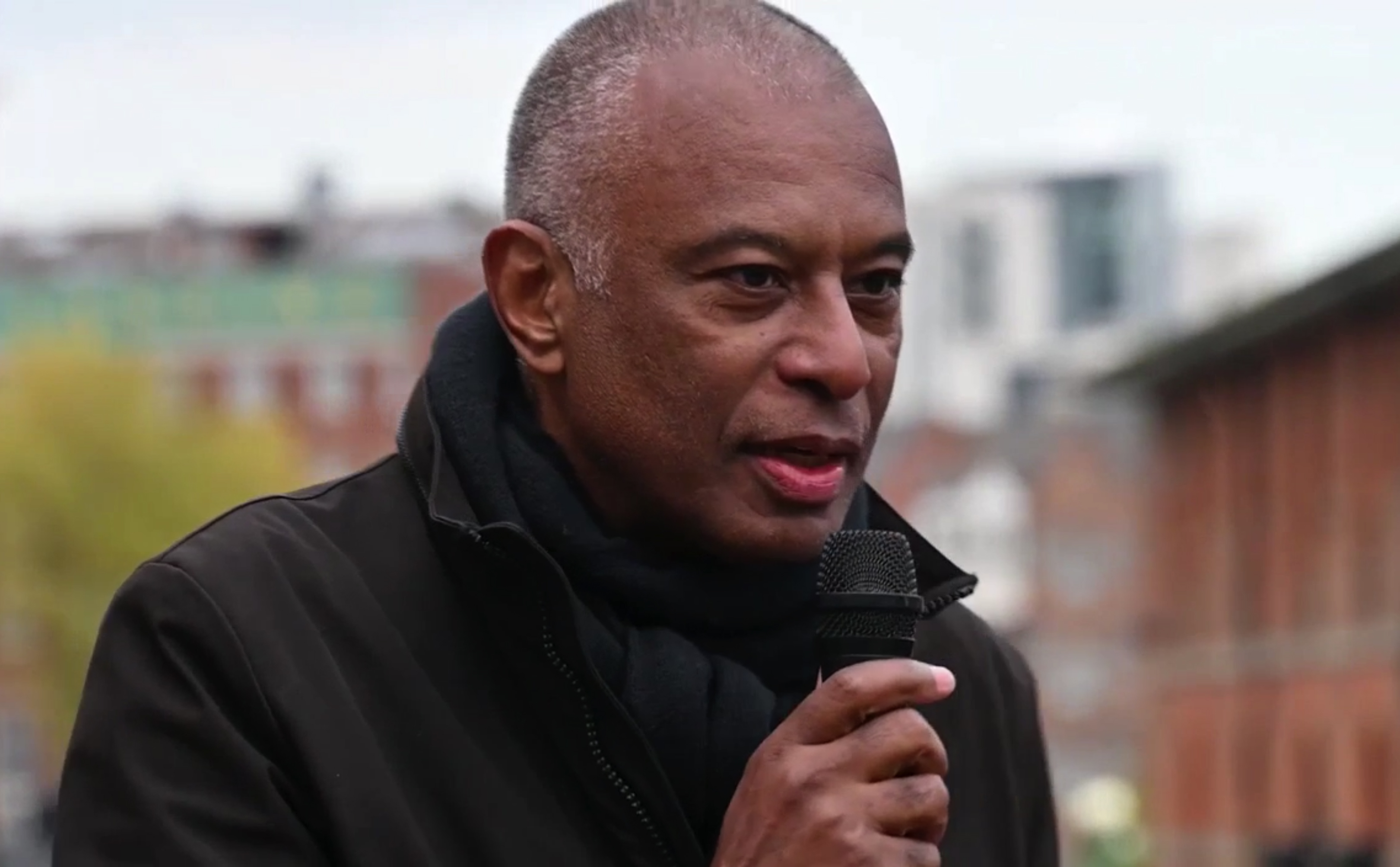
- Born: 13 March 1958 (age 68); Saint Kitts
- Education: Queen's College, Oxford University
- Occupations: Novelist, playwright, essayist
- Writing career
- Notable works: The Final Passage (1985), Crossing the River (1993), Dancing in the Dark (2005)
- Notable awards: James Tait Black Memorial Prize (1994); Commonwealth Writers' Prize (2003, 2006)

Caryl Phillips (born 13 March 1958) is a Kittitian-British novelist, playwright and essayist. Best known for his novels (for which he has won multiple awards), Phillips is often described as a Black Atlantic writer, since much of his fictional output is defined by its interest in, and searching exploration of, the experiences of peoples of the African diaspora in England, the Caribbean and the United States. As well as writing, Phillips has worked as an academic at numerous institutions including Amherst College, Barnard College, and Yale University, where he has held the position of Professor of English since 2005.

== Life ==
Caryl Phillips was born in St. Kitts to Malcolm and Lillian Phillips on 13 March 1958. When he was four months old, his family moved to England and settled in Leeds, Yorkshire. In 1976, Phillips won a place at Queen's College, Oxford University, where he read English, graduating in 1979. While at Oxford, he directed numerous plays and spent his summers working as a stagehand at the Edinburgh Festival. On graduating, he moved to Edinburgh, where he lived for a year, on the dole, while writing his first play, Strange Fruit (1980), which was taken up and produced by the Crucible Theatre in Sheffield. Phillips subsequently moved to London, where he wrote two more plays – Where There is Darkness (1982) and Shelter (1983) – that were staged at the Lyric Hammersmith.

At the age of 22, he visited St. Kitts for the first time since his family had left the island in 1958. The journey provided the inspiration for his first novel, The Final Passage, which was published five years later, winning the Malcolm X Prize for Literature in 1985, presented by James Baldwin at the Greater London Council Literature Awards. After publishing his second book, A State of Independence (1986), Phillips went on a one-month journey around Europe, which resulted in his 1987 collection of essays The European Tribe. During the late 1980s and early 1990s, Phillips divided his time between England and St. Kitts while working on his novels Higher Ground (1989) and Cambridge (1991). At that time, Phillips was a member of the Black Bristol Writers Group, which helped to foster his creative writing.

In 1990, Phillips took up a Visiting Writer post at Amherst College in Amherst, Massachusetts. He remained at Amherst College for a further eight years, becoming the youngest English tenured professor in the US when he was promoted to that position in 1995. During this time, he wrote what is perhaps his best-known novel, Crossing the River (1993), which won the Commonwealth Writers' Prize and the James Tait Black Memorial Prize, and was shortlisted for the Booker Prize. After taking up the position at Amherst, Phillips found himself doing "a sort of triangular thing" for a number of years, residing between England, St Kitts, and the U.S.

Finding this way of living both "incredibly exhausting" and "prohibitively expensive", Phillips ultimately decided to give up his residence in St. Kitts, though he says he still makes regular visits to the island. In 1998, he joined Barnard College, Columbia University, as the Henry R. Luce Professor of Migration and Social Order. In 2005 he moved to Yale University, where he currently works as Professor of English. He was made an elected fellow of the Royal Society of Literature in 2000, and an elected fellow of the Royal Society of Arts in 2011.

Phillips supports football team Leeds United and watches "every game".

== Works and critical reception ==
Phillips has tackled themes on the African slave trade from many angles, and his writing is concerned with issues of "origins, belongings and exclusion", as noted by a reviewer of his 2015 novel The Lost Child. The Atlantic Sound has been compared to the travel writing in Looking for Transwonderland, by Nigerian writer Noo Saro-Wiwa.

Phillips received the PEN/Beyond Margins Award for Dancing in the Dark in 2006.

== Activism ==
Caryl Philips unveiling a Leeds Civic Trust Blue Plaque to David Oluwale, 25 April 2022

Phillips is the patron of the David Oluwale Memorial Association, which works to promote the memory of the death of David Oluwale, a Nigerian man in Leeds who was persecuted to death by the police. On 25 April 2022 Phillips unveiled a Leeds Civic Trust blue plaque commemorating Oluwale's death, which was torn down hours later.

== Bibliography ==
=== Novels ===
- The Final Passage (Faber and Faber, 1985, ISBN 978-0571134373; Picador, 1995, paperback ISBN 978-0571134373)
- A State of Independence (Faber and Faber, 1986, ISBN 978-0571139101; paperback ISBN 978-0571196791)
- Frihetens Tillstånd : Roman (Gedin, 1987)
- Higher Ground: A Novel in Three Parts (Viking, 1989, ISBN 978-0670826209)
- Cambridge (Bloomsbury, 1991; Vintage, 2008, paperback ISBN 978-0099520566)
- Crossing the River (Bloomsbury, 1993, ISBN 978-0747514978)
- The Nature of Blood (1997; Vintage, 2008, paperback ISBN 978-0099520573)
- Stuart Hall (BOMB magazine, 1997)
- A Distant Shore (Secker, 2003, hardback ISBN 978-0436205644; Vintage, 2004, paperback ISBN 978-0099428886)
- Dancing in the Dark (Secker, 2005, ISBN 978-0436205835)
- Foreigners: Three English Lives (Harvill Secker, 2007, ISBN 978-0436205972)
- In the Falling Snow (Harvill Secker, 2009, hardback ISBN 978-1846553066; Vintage, 2010, paperback ISBN 978-0099539742)
- The Lost Child (Oneworld Publications, 2015, ISBN 978-1780746999 hardback, 978-1780747989 paperback)
- A View of the Empire at Sunset: A Novel (Farrar, Straus and Giroux, 2018, hardback, ISBN 978-0374283612)
- Another Man in the Street. 7 January 2025. ISBN 978-0-374-61355-6.

=== Essay collections ===
- The European Tribe (Faber and Faber, 1987)
- The Atlantic Sound (Faber and Faber, 2000, ISBN 978-0571196203)
- C.L.R. James: The Most Noteworthy Caribbean Mind of the Twentieth Century (2001)
- A New World Order: Selected Essays (Martin Secker & Warburg, 2001, ISBN 978-0436205606)
- Colour Me English (Harvill Secker, 2011, paperback ISBN 978-1846553059)

=== As editor ===
- Extravagant Strangers: A Literature of Belonging (Faber and Faber, 1997, ISBN 978-0571190867)

=== Plays ===
- Strange Fruit (Amber Lane Press, 1980, ISBN 978-0906399279)
- Where There is Darkness (Amber Lane Press, 1982, ISBN 0906399343, 978-0906399347)
- The Shelter (Amber Lane Press, 1984, ISBN 978-0906399491)
- Playing Away (Faber and Faber, 1987, ISBN 978-0571145836)
- A Kind of Home – James Baldwin in Paris (BBC Radio 4, 9 January 2004)
- Hotel Cristobel (BBC Radio 3, 13 March 2005)
- A Long Way from Home (BBC Radio 3, 30 March 2008)

== Awards ==
- 1985: Malcolm X Prize for Literature, The Final Pasage
- 1987 Martin Luther King Memorial Prize, The European Tribe
- 1993 Guggenheim Fellowship
- 1994 Lannan Literary Award
- 1994 James Tait Black Memorial Prize, Crossing the River
- 2000 Fellow of the Royal Society of Literature
- 2004 Commonwealth Writers Prize, Crossing the River
- 2006 Honorary Fellow of The Queen's College, Oxford
- 2006 Commonwealth Writers Prize, A Distant Shore
- 2011 Fellow of the Royal Society of Arts
- 2012 Best of the James Tait Black, shortlist, Crossing the River
