= River crossing =

A river crossing is a means to get from one river bank to the other and may refer to:

- A ford (crossing)
- A bridge
- A tunnel
- Any type of ferry
  - A cable ferry
  - A reaction ferry
  - A water taxi
- an overhead line crossing

== See also ==
- Armoured vehicle-launched bridge
- River crossing puzzle
- Crossing the River, a 1993 historical fiction novel by Caryl Phillips
- Crossing (disambiguation)
