= Computer One =

1993 novel by Warwick Collins

- First edition
- Author: Warwick Collins
- Language: English
- Genre: Science fiction
- Publisher: No Exit Press
- Publication date: 1993
- Publication place: United Kingdom

Computer One is a science fiction novel of the near future by British novelist Warwick Collins, published in 1993. The novel charts the discovery by Professor Enzo Yakuda (the main protagonist) that the international civil network of computers known as "Computer One" will come to see humanity as a threat and move to eliminate it.

== Plot summary ==
The novel describes a near utopia in which almost everything is automated by Computer One, with humanity's primary struggle being what to do with all its leisure time when there is very little work to be done.

Though analogous to the Internet, the Computer One of the novel assumes a far greater unity of purpose and truth. Whereas the content of sites on the World Wide Web varies greatly and typically reflects the views of individual authors, Computer One provides a single authoritative source of information with no ambiguity.

== References in popular culture ==
In 1983, Australian band Dear Enemy released a song titled "Computer One". The song questions the ability of Computer One to know and instruct where matters of love and human motive are concerned.

- Computer One by Warwick Collins on Goodreads

== Sources ==
- Collins, Warwick (1993). Computer One. No Exit Press. ISBN 1-874061-12-2.
