= 1958 Notting Hill race riots =

Race riots in London

The Notting Hill race riots were a series of racially motivated riots that took place in Notting Hill, a district of London, between 29 August and 5 September 1958.

== Background ==
Following the end of the Second World War, and as a result of the losses of lives during the war, the British government began to encourage mass immigration from the various territories of the British Empire, and later the Commonwealth, to fill shortages in the labour market. The British Nationality Act 1948 gave Citizenship of the UK and its colonies to all people living in the British Empire, and the right of entry and settlement in the UK. Many West Indians were attracted by better prospects in what was often referred to as the mother country. As a result, Afro-Caribbean immigration to Britain increased. By 1961, London's Caribbean population exceeded 100,000, with many residing in the Notting Hill area. By the 1950s, a certain gang of white working-class teens known as "Teddy boys" was beginning to display hostility towards black families in the area. The situation was exploited and inflamed by groups such as Oswald Mosley's Union Movement and other far-right groups such as the White Defence League, which urged "Keep Britain White" (aka "KBW") using leaflets and wall graffiti.

There was an increase in violent attacks on black people throughout the summer. On 24 August 1958 a group of ten English youths committed serious assaults on six West Indian men in four incidents. At 5.40 a.m., the youths' car was spotted by two police officers who pursued them into the White City estate.

Just prior to the Notting Hill riots, there was racial unrest in St Ann's in Nottingham which began on 23 August, and continued intermittently for two weeks.

== Majbritt Morrison ==
The riot is often believed to have been triggered by an assault against Majbritt Morrison, a white Swedish woman, on 29 August 1958. Morrison had been arguing with her Jamaican husband Raymond Morrison at the Latimer Road Underground station. A group of various white people attempted to intervene in the argument, and a small fight broke out between the intervening people and some of Raymond Morrison's friends. The following day Majbritt Morrison was verbally and physically assaulted by a gang of white youths that had recalled seeing her the night before. According to one report, the youths threw milk bottles at Morrison and called her racial slurs such as "Black man's trollop", while a later report stated that she had also been struck in the back with an iron bar.

== The riot ==
Later that night a mob of 300 to 400 white people were seen on Bramley Road attacking the houses of West Indian residents. The disturbances, rioting and attacks continued every night until 6 September.

The Metropolitan Police arrested more than 140 people during the two weeks of the disturbances, mostly white youths but also many black people found carrying weapons. A report to the Metropolitan Police Commissioner stated that of the 108 people charged with crimes such as grievous bodily harm, affray and riot and possessing offensive weapons, 72 were white and 36 were black.

=== Aftermath ===
The sentencing of the nine white youths by Mr Justice Salmon has been passed into judicial lore as an example of "exemplary sentencing" – a harsh punishment intended to act as a deterrent to others. Each of the youths were sentenced to five years in prison and was ordered to pay £500.

A "Caribbean Carnival", precursor of the Notting Hill Carnival, was held on 30 January 1959 in St Pancras Town Hall. Activist Claudia Jones organised this carnival in response to the riots and to the state of race relations in Britain at the time.

The riots caused tension between the Metropolitan Police and the British African-Caribbean community, which claimed that the police had not taken seriously the community's reports of racial attacks. In 2002, files that revealed that senior police officers at the time had assured the Home Secretary, Rab Butler, that there was little or no racial motivation behind the disturbance, despite testimony from individual police officers to the contrary, were released.

== Cultural depictions ==
Majbritt Morrison wrote about the riots in her autobiography, Jungle West 11 (1964).

The Notting Hill race riots feature prominently in the Colin MacInnes novel Absolute Beginners (1959) and the 1986 film of the same name.

On 29 September 1958, Hot Summer Night premiered in the UK centering on a white family struggling to accept their daughter's love for a black Jamaican man. When the play was later turned into the 1961 film Flame in the Streets, with Earl Cameron and Johnny Sekka, the climax revolves around a new riot sequence undoubtedly inspired by events in Notting Hill.

The Notting Hill race riots are described in the Eastenders episode of 24 February 2009; the episode focuses on fictional character Patrick Trueman's experiences during the riots.

Television playwright Nigel Kneale was partly inspired by the riots to include a similar event in the climax of his serial Quatermass and The Pit.

== See also ==
- Murder of Kelso Cochrane
- 2024 UK race riots
- 2026 Northern Ireland riots
