= Colour Me English =

2011 collection of essays by Caryl Phillips

- Author: Caryl Phillips
- Genre: Essays
- Publisher: Harvill Secker; The New Press
- Publication date: 2011; 15 years ago
- Media type: Print
- Pages: 352

Colour Me English is a 2011 collection of essays by Caryl Phillips. Written over a period of 20 years, the essays deal with themes of identity, home and belonging.

== Reception ==
Reviewed by Robert Epstein in The Independent, the book was called "a polymorphous delight that always retains at its core the notion of identity: how it is constructed, how it is thrust upon us, how we can change it. It is about our sense of self, how we fit within society – and how both society and individuals must adapt to each other in order for both to thrive....Phillips places himself in the tradition of James Baldwin, Chinua Achebe and Ha Jin as a writer who, by moving abroad, has gained perspective on his homeland."

In the words of Courttia Newland in Wasafiri magazine, the collection "revisits the author’s chosen territories of ‘displacement, home/homelessness, race and identity’, as defined by Renée Schatteman, editor of Conversations with Caryl Phillips (2009). It is a volume heaving with insights, musings and ideology, some thirty-eight essays in all, each dissecting the notion of tribal belonging and its polar opposite, exclusion. Much of the collection details the travels Phillips has undertaken since he was first published by Faber and Faber in 1985, spanning countries as diverse as Sierra Leone, Ghana, Belgium and France. The writings also map temporal journeys; essays such as 'Water' go back to 1993, while others like 'Ground Zero' and another on the Chinese-American novelist, Ha Jin, are clearly written more recently."

According to Samira Shackle in the New Statesman, "This book is as much about writing as it is about race. Phillips explores his own development as a writer and the struggle of negotiating identities. Seen through this prism, travel is both part of a 'long tradition' of British writers and an attempt to work out where his identity should be placed. He feels he cannot do this in England, a country that 'seemed to revel in its ability to reduce identity to clichés'. Phillips had it tough growing up in Leeds in the 1960s and 1970s and undeniably life was hard for the first wave of immigrants to the UK, yet I can't help but feel that he is sometimes too harsh on Britain. Too often, he writes as if little has changed – perhaps because he has lived abroad for many years. (...) Nonetheless, this is a thought-provoking collection by an accomplished author whose subtle, unobtrusive style allows him to explore familiar subjects in an original way."

Summarizing the collection, Marita Golden writes in the Washington Independent Review of Books: "Phillips offers the reader a fresh vision of the 'issues' of the lost-and-found nature of our identities (no matter who we are), displacement, migration and connectedness in a world that has yoked us together even and ever more closely."

== Editions ==
- Colour Me English, London: Harvill Secker, 2011, paperback ISBN 978-1846553059
- Colour Me English: Migration and Belonging Before and After 9/11, New York: The New Press, 2011, hardback ISBN 978-1595586506
- Colour Me English: Reflections on Migration and Belonging, New York: The New Press, 2013, paperback ISBN 978-1595588357
