= Sam Selvon =

Trinidadian writer (1923–1994)

Samuel Selvon
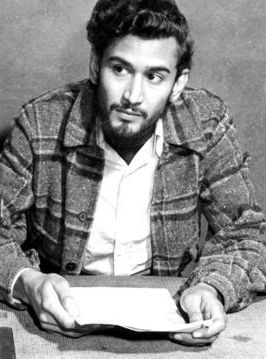
- Selvon in 1952
- Born: Samuel Dickson Selvon; 20 May 1923; San Fernando, Trinidad and Tobago
- Died: 16 April 1994 (aged 70); Piarco International Airport, Piarco, Tunapuna–Piarco, Trinidad and Tobago
- Education: Naparima College
- Spouses: Draupadi Persaud; Althea Daroux
- Children: Two daughters and two sons
- Writing career
- Pen name: Michael Wentworth; Esses; Ack-Ack; Big Buffer
- Notable work: The Lonely Londoners (1956)

Samuel Dickson Selvon (20 May 1923 – 16 April 1994) was a Trinidad-born writer, who moved to London, England, in 1950. His 1956 novel The Lonely Londoners is groundbreaking in its use of creolised English, or "nation language", for narrative as well as dialogue.

== Life and work ==
Samuel Dickson Selvon was born in San Fernando in the south of Trinidad, the sixth of seven children. His father was a first-generation Christian Tamil Indian immigrant from Madras and his mother was a Christian Scottish Indian. His maternal grandfather was Scottish and his maternal grandmother was Indian.

Selvon was educated at Naparima College, San Fernando, before leaving at the age of 15 to work. He was a wireless operator with the local branch of the Royal Naval Reserve from 1940 to 1945 during the Second World War. Thereafter, he moved north to Port of Spain, and from 1945 to 1950, worked for the Trinidad Guardian as a reporter and for a time on its literary page. In this period, he began writing stories and descriptive pieces, mostly under a variety of pseudonyms, including Michael Wentworth, Esses, Ack-Ack, and Big Buffer. Much of this early writing is to be found in Foreday Morning (eds Kenneth Ramchand and Susheila Nasta, 1989).

In 1950, Selvon moved to London, England, where he took menial jobs, eventually working as a clerk for the Indian Embassy, while writing in his spare time. His short stories and poetry appeared in various publications, including the London Magazine, New Statesman, and The Nation. In London, he also worked with the BBC, producing two television scripts, Anansi the Spiderman, and Home Sweet India.

Selvon was a fellow in creative writing at the University of Dundee from 1975 until 1977. In the late 1970s, he moved to Alberta, Canada, and found a job teaching creative writing as a visiting professor at the University of Victoria. When that job ended, he took a job as a janitor at the University of Calgary in Alberta for a few months before becoming writer-in-residence there. He was largely ignored by the Canadian literary establishment, with his works receiving no reviews during his residency.

On a return trip to Trinidad, Selvon died of respiratory failure due to extensive bronchopneumonia and chronic lung disease on 16 April 1994 at Piarco International Airport; his ashes were subsequently interred at the University of the West Indies cemetery, St Augustine, Trinidad.

Selvon married twice: in 1947 to Draupadi Persaud, with whom he had one daughter, and in 1963 to Althea Daroux, with whom he had two sons and a daughter.

== Writing ==
Selvon is best known for his novels The Lonely Londoners (1956) and Moses Ascending (1975). His novel A Brighter Sun (1952), detailing the construction of the Churchill-Roosevelt Highway in Trinidad through the eyes of young Indian worker Tiger, was a popular choice on the CXC English Literature syllabus for many years. Other notable works include the collection of stories Ways of Sunlight (1957), Turn Again Tiger (1958) and Those Who Eat the Cascadura (1972). During the 1960s and 1970s, Selvon converted several of his novels and stories into radio scripts, broadcast by the BBC, which were collected in Eldorado West One (Peepal Tree Press, 1988) and Highway in the Sun (Peepal Tree Press, 1991).

The Lonely Londoners, like most of Selvon's later work, focuses on the migration of West Indians to Britain in the 1950s and 1960s, and tells, mostly in anecdotal form, the daily experience of settlers from Africa and the Caribbean. Selvon also illustrates the panoply of different subcultures that exist within London, as with any major city, due to class and racial boundaries. In many ways, his books are the precursors to works such as White Teeth (2000) by Zadie Smith and The Buddha of Suburbia (1990) by Hanif Kureishi. Selvon explained:

"When I wrote the novel that became The Lonely Londoners, I tried to recapture a certain quality in West Indian everyday life. I had in store a number of wonderful anecdotes and could put them into focus, but I had difficulty starting the novel in straight English. The people I wanted to describe were entertaining people indeed, but I could not really move. At that stage, I had written the narrative in English and most of the dialogues in dialect. Then I started both narrative and dialogue in dialect and the novel just shot along."

In the late 1980s, Selvon wrote personal essays reflecting on his West Indian identity. These include "Three into one can't go – East Indian, Trinidadian or West Indian?" (1986), in which Selvon reflects on the complexities of being of East Indian heritage, born and raised in Trinidad, and of West Indian identity. He also wrote "Finding West Indian Identity in London" (1987), in which he reflects on developing a West Indian consciousness after immigrating to London in 1950.

Selvon's papers are now at the Harry Ransom Humanities Research Center at the University of Texas, Austin, USA. These consist of holograph manuscripts, typescripts, book proofs, manuscript notebooks, and correspondence. Drafts for six of his 11 novels are present, along with supporting correspondence and items relating to his career.

== Awards and legacy ==
Selvon was awarded two Guggenheim Fellowships (in 1955 and 1968), an honorary doctorate from Warwick University in 1989, and in 1985 the honorary degree of DLitt by the University of the West Indies. In 1969 he was awarded the Trinidad & Tobago Hummingbird Medal Gold for Literature, and in 1994 he was (posthumously) given another national award, the Chaconia Medal Gold for Literature. In 2012 he was honoured with a NALIS Lifetime Achievement Literary Award for his contributions to Trinidad and Tobago's literature.

On what would have been his 95th birthday, 20 May 2018, Selvon was honoured with a Google Doodle.

== Bibliography ==
- A Brighter Sun (1952)
- A Meap Story (1954)
- An Island is a World (1955)
- The Lonely Londoners (1956)
- Ways of Sunlight, short stories (1957)
- Turn Again Tiger (1959)
- I Hear Thunder (1963)
- The Housing Lark (1965)
- The Plains of Caroni (1970)
- Those Who Eat the Cascadura (1972)
- Moses Ascending (1975)
- Moses Migrating (1983)
- Foreday Morning (1989)
- Eldorado West One, collected one-act plays (1989)
- Highway in the Sun and Other Plays (1991)

== Filmography (as writer) ==
- Pressure (1976), co-written with Horace Ové

== Other sources ==
- Selvon, Sam (1984). Moses Ascending. London: Heinemann. p. i. ISBN 978-0435989521.
