= City of Spades =

1957 novel by Colin MacInnes

- First edition
- Author: Colin MacInnes
- Cover artist: Alexander Weatherson
- Language: English
- Publisher: MacGibbon & Kee
- Publication date: 1957
- Publication place: United Kingdom

City of Spades is a novel written by Colin MacInnes published in 1957 and the first book in what is described as MacInnes’s "London Trilogy", the other two titles being Absolute Beginners (1959) and Mr Love & Justice (1960). Following the adventures of Johnny Fortune, a recently arrived Nigerian immigrant, the novel bears witness to the emergent black culture in London in the late 1950s. It was adapted by Biyi Bandele as a radio play, directed by Toby Swift, broadcast on BBC Radio 4 on 28 April 2001.
