= A Distant Shore (novel) =

2003 novel by Caryl Phillips

- First edition (UK)
- Author: Caryl Phillips
- Language: English
- Publication date: 2003

A Distant Shore is the seventh novel by Black British author Caryl Phillips, published in 2003 by Secker & Warburg in the UK and Knopf in the US. It was a finalist for the 2003 PEN/Faulkner Award. In the 2004 Commonwealth Writers' Prize it won the Best Book Prize in the Europe and South Asia category and was judged that year's overall Best Book.

Set in contemporary England, A Distant Shore is the story of an African man and an English woman "whose hidden lives, and worlds, are revealed in their fragile, fateful connection". As the author has stated: "It is obviously a novel about the challenged identity of two individuals, but it's also a novel about English—or national—identity."

== Reception ==
Natasha Walter writes for The Guardian: "This novel hums with ambition." Diana Evans, for The Independent, praises the author's exploration of: "migration, asylum, home and loneliness", whilst criticizing certain linguistic cliches, and says that the prose style "lacks edge." Kirkus Reviews summarizes the novel as: "Harsh and sad, but worth the trip."
