= Crossing the River =

1993 novel by Caryl Phillips

- First edition
- Author: Caryl Phillips
- Language: English
- Genre: Historical novel
- Publisher: Bloomsbury Publishing
- Publication date: 18 January 1993
- Publication place: United Kingdom
- Media type: Print (Hardback & Paperback)
- Pages: 237 pp.
- ISBN: 0-7475-1497-6
- OCLC: 28962836

Crossing the River is a historical novel by British author Caryl Phillips, published in 1993. The Village Voice calls it "a fearless reimagining of the geography and meaning of the African diaspora." The Boston Globe said, "Crossing the River bears eloquently chastened testimony to the shattering of black lives."

== Plot introduction ==
Crossing the River is a story about three black people during different time periods and in different continents as they struggle with the separation from their native Africa. The novel follows Nash, who travels from America to Africa to educate natives about Christ; Martha, an old woman who attempts to travel from Virginia to California to escape the injustices of being a slave; and Travis, a member of the U.S. military who goes to England during World War II.

=== Explanation of the novel's title ===
The title Crossing the River refers to a metaphor for both death and deliverance. Figuratively, the river symbolizes the great obstacles Africans had to overcome during life in being forcefully displaced. Those that survived the passage to their new destination spent the rest of their lives trying to overcome the obstacles. Most, however, as Phillips suggests, can only successfully cross the river and be delivered in death. The ancestor narrator also seems to suggest this when he calls his children home to him on the far side of the river after they have passed on. Geographically, the river refers to the Atlantic Ocean, the main body of water that Africans had to cross when traveling to America.

== Plot summary ==
The novel's opening is mostly the perspective of Nash, Martha, and Travis' "father" mixed with the thoughts of slave trader James Hamilton, which are expressed in italics. The narrator explains that he had to sell his three children to slavery because his crops failed and he had no money.

Nash's story as an adult is first revealed through the perspective of his white master Edward Williams, who freed Nash so that he could go to Africa with the American Colonization Society to teach black natives. Edward, however, receives a letter saying that Nash had disappeared from the African village where he had been teaching. Edward immediately boards a ship to take him to Africa, and after many days of searching, a former slave of Edward's informs him that Nash had died from fever. Edward is horribly upset, and his grief is further drawn out when he realizes that his beloved Nash was not the holy Christian he thought him to be. He finds plenty that points out Nash's negative behavior, such as his large collection of native wives. The chapter ends with Edward gaping at the hovel that was once Nash's residence while natives stare on, trying to understand the apparent momentary insanity of the shocked and aggrieved stranger.

The story then switches to Martha Randolph, an old woman who, after losing her husband and daughter at a slave auction, decides to run away from her owners in Kansas and seek freedom in California. She only makes it to Colorado, however, where the group she is traveling with leaves her because she is slowing down the party. A white woman offers Martha a place to room for the night out of the bitter cold, but it is not enough. When the woman returns to Martha the next day, Martha is dead. The white woman decides that she is going to have to "choose a name for her if she was going to receive a Christian burial" (p. 94), which is ironic since Martha hated receiving a new name each time she was passed to a different owner and because Martha did not believe in God.

The final section is told through the eyes of Joyce, a white Englishwoman who falls in love with Travis, who is the "brother" of Nash and Martha. Since Travis' story occurs during World War II (about a century after his supposed brother Nash's), it can be assumed that Travis is a sort of reincarnation of Nash and Martha's brother from more than a century before. In that case, it can be implied that the ancestor narrator is not the children's true father; rather he is some sort of all-knowing ancestor who has "listened" to his "children" for the last "two hundred and fifty years" (p. 1).

Joyce meets Travis at her husband's store. Joyce's husband habitually beats her, and when her husband is taken to prison for selling items on the black market, Joyce and Travis have an affair. Joyce has Travis's baby but has to give it up after Travis dies in the war because it would be unacceptable for her to raise a black baby on her own. The chapter ends with a visit from Greer when he is 20 years old, who meets his mother for the first time after being raised in an orphanage.

The book ends with the ancestor narrator once more, who provides an optimistic view even after all his children have died, saying that though he "sold his beloved children … they arrived on the far bank of the river, loved" (p. 237).

== Characters in Crossing the River ==
Major characters

- The Ancestor: In the opening of the novel, the narrator is the voice of an old man who was forced to sell his three children into slavery because his crops failed. As the story develops, it becomes clear that the narrator is not a person. Rather the narrator is Africa or a sort of African voice or ancestor, grieving the children it has lost in the diaspora.
- Edward Williams: A rich plantation owner who believes slavery is wrong yet participates in many of its aspects. He is a Christian man whose life's work consisted of instilling Christianity among his slaves. His favorite slaves were educated and went to college at Edward's expense. Those he saw as worthy enough were sent to Liberia under the American Colonization Society.
- Nash Williams: Edward Williams' favorite slave who goes to Liberia as a Christian missionary and ultimately dies. In Liberia, Nash attempts to establish a Christian settlement but fails when his master ceases to communicate with him or support him. With no support from Edward, Nash loses his way and adopts many of the African customs he had previously regarded as primitive and unchristian. Nash dies of African fever weeks after his last communication with Edward. He dies without completing his missionary work and without returning to America to see his former master.
- Martha Randolph: A runaway slave whose life goal is to reach California and rejoin her long-lost daughter. She never makes it to California but gets as far as Colorado where she dies from exposure. In her moment of death, Martha is delivered and dreams of reaching California and finding her daughter, Eliza Mae.
- James Hamilton: A slave trader and master of the ship the Duke of York whose actions contradict his religious beliefs. He is a Christian man and believes slavery is wrong but is not dissuaded from enterprising in human bondage. He keeps a log of events and writes the hardships of his journey in his journal, which is how the reader gains access to his interiority.
- Joyce: A white Englishwoman who represents progress in eliminating discrimination against Black people. She falls in love with Travis, an African American soldier and has an affair with him while her husband, Len, is in jail. Race is not an issue with Joyce, which is made clear by the fact that she never mentions his color.
- Travis: A black officer in the U.S. Army serving overseas. He falls in love with Joyce and gives her the respect and consideration she has never received. He is the only character that embodies Christian values without hypocrisy or pretense. He is relocated to Italy where he dies and leaves Joyce widowed and his son fatherless.

Other characters

- Madison Williams
- Amelia Williams
- Charles
- Chester
- Lucy
- Eliza Mae
- Greer (Joyce and Travis's son)
- Len
- Joyce's mother

== Major themes ==
Dislocation and restoration

The feeling of loss and pain in the novel stems from one main thing: dislocation. Dislocation is the one thing that creates all the painful stories. One wonders what would have happened to these characters if slave traders had not torn them from their homeland.

Nash never would have become Edward's pet in America and never would have journeyed back to Africa to unsuccessfully fend off disease and later die. Martha never would have lost her husband and daughter. And Travis never would have died in Italy. All of these characters died in lands that were strange to them, suggesting that the characters were ill at ease in their new environments ever since they were taken from Africa. The narrator at the beginning and end of the text, however, is still optimistic, reasoning that his children will still reach the other side of the river – their true home – if they are determined and willing to survive.

Nash, Martha, and Travis all struggled and defied what was expected of them; they did not meekly accept their situations. Nash became so delusional in Africa as a missionary that he was almost like a white slave driver himself, forcing the natives to work for him and scoffing at their ideas of religion and cultural practices. Martha, on the other hand, looked for freedom on the West Coast, and Travis fell in love with a white woman. All of these characters defied the expectation that blacks would live low, submissive lives and fulfill the desires of the white man. In this way, they were able to find the other side of the river and become rooted as the "seeds of new trees" (p. 2). [Missing reference]

Contradiction of emancipation and restriction

The irony in Crossing the River is that though Nash, Martha, and Travis are all "free," they still are restricted in many ways. They each deal with their newly found freedom in different ways: Nash agrees to go to Africa as one in few educated and freed black men. Later, however, he becomes limited and restricted in his own view of the world – he sees things as a slave owner might toward the end of the novel. Freedom for Martha comes at the cost of her life as she escapes the Hoffmans in Kansas. Travis, whose story occurs after the Emancipation Proclamation, is technically free but is still bound by a white culture that refuses to accept his relationship with a white woman. Instead of freedom enhancing their world view, freedom impedes them and is one more obstacle that they must overcome before they can reach the far side of the river. [missing reference]

Christianity and its relation to morality and hypocrisy

Christians in Crossing the River are presented somewhat negatively. Many of Phillips' characters lack faith, and the majority of those that do believe act hypocritically.

For example, one of the main characters, Martha, gave up believing in God because she could not "sympathize with the sufferings of the son of God when set against her own private misery" (p. 79). Martha, having lost her husband and daughter and everything worthwhile in her life, completely lost faith in everything, including religion. Martha's owners the Hoffmans, on the other hand, were devout Christians and tried to get Martha to go to a "revival by the river," where a minister tried to "cast light on Martha's dark soul" (p. 79). The Hoffmans try to sell Martha when the family decides they want to move to California. They do not even think twice about sending her back to Missouri, where racism and evil slave traders flourish. Their decision demonstrates a lack of strong morals despite their religion.

Joyce, Travis' love interest, also does not believe in God. She expected God to listen to her after getting an abortion, and when he did not, she "left Christ" (p. 194). Joyce seemed to want some sort of reconciliation with her cold, distanced mother and hoped that religion could fill the gap between them. But when Joyce left church, her mother "left (her)" (p. 194).

The Hoffmans and Joyce's mother (as well as Hamilton and Nash) all had the pretense of being good Christians. In reality, however, these characters' morals were anything but good. They all tried to force their beliefs on people that they deemed were below them. Phillips seems to say that it's wrong to transplant people from their native country and then force a belief system on them that the so-called Christians do not even follow themselves. The Hoffmans, Joyce's mother, Hamilton, and Nash are all hypocrites. Martha and Joyce struggle to find their place in this forced system of beliefs, just like the Africans struggle to find their way in America or any other place they were forced to go once they'd been uprooted from their native land. Travis alone seems to be the one person who maintains Christian beliefs without becoming a hypocrite. When Joyce's mother dies, he asks if he can say a prayer, and Joyce lets him. He never pushes Joyce to accept his religion. Travis is obviously flawed – as demonstrated by his affair with Joyce – but at least he never pretends to be something he's not. [missing reference]

== Literary significance and reception ==
Crossing the River has been translated into various languages and is internationally acclaimed for its portrayal of the realities of the African diaspora. It has sold hundreds of thousands of copies since its initial publication in 1993 and has become required reading in universities across the country. Black scholars and critics alike have raved at Caryl Phillips' deep insight into the struggles of Africans in one of the largest dislocations of people in history.

"This ambitious novel amounts to a chorale. ... Phillip's gifts are manifest and his technical prowess enlarges with each novel. ... An impressively controlled performance." —Chicago Tribune
"Beautifully measured writing that powerfully evokes the far-reaching realities of the African diaspora. A masterwork." —Kirkus Reviews
"With irony, understatement, and artful compression ... Phillips distills the African diaspora to an essence, bitter, and unforgettable." —Entertainment Weekly
"Memorable, convincing characters, broad vision, and evocative narrative result in a novel both resonant and deeply moving. ... A stirring meditation on the hardship and perseverance of people torn from home." —Publishers Weekly

== Allusions and references ==
=== Allusions to other works ===
Martin Luther King Jr.'s "I Have a Dream" speech

The ancestor of Nash, Martha, and Travis mentions in his closing remarks the following from Martin Luther King Jr.'s "I Have a Dream" speech: "I have a dream that one day on the red hills of Georgia, the sons of former slaves and the sons of former slave owners will be able to sit down together at the table of brotherhood." The quote is useful in connecting the entire African experience through the course of generations because it relates to a recent figure in black history.

Harriet Beecher Stowe's Uncle Tom's Cabin

"Crossing the river," as mentioned before, is a reference to Uncle Tom's Cabin when the slave Eliza crosses the river to escape from her master. However, according to some literary scholars, the crossing of the river also meant crossing from "this world to the next." This meaning fits well with the ancestor's desire to call his children across the river after their deaths. Similar to the "I have a dream" speech, Uncle Tom's Cabin also strings together another aspect of the black historical perspective. For even though the text was written by a white woman, it was essential in stirring up much antislavery sentiment – even in countries as far away as England. Uncle Tom's Cabin majorly advanced the cause of African Americans across the globe.

Phillips further alludes to the novel when he names Martha's daughter Eliza Mae. Eliza and Eliza Mae are both long-lost daughters. Eliza eventually meets her mother in Canada. Martha, on the other hand, only meets Eliza Mae in her dreams and finds that Eliza Mae has changed her name to Cleo. Martha reports that "all was not right" (p. 94). Martha dies moments afterward, signaling her release from the anxiety of not finding her daughter. Through death, Martha is finally able to overcome the pain of her life and "cross the river."

=== Historical allusions ===
World War I and II

A large part of Joyce's narration focuses on these two events. She first mentions her father who died in the Great War, which in part explains Joyce's mother's sadness and hostility throughout the text. World War II, however, takes on a greater significance in the novel since it is actually occurring at the time that Joyce tells her narrative. The text mentions Adolf Hitler, ration books, the Axis powers, Benito Mussolini, Neville Chamberlain, Winston Churchill, blackout curtains, Jerry planes, and even a lack of basic hygiene products such as scented soap so that the reader gets the idea of what it was to actually live in that time period. Joyce mentions the fall of France and the disappointment on the troops' faces as they heard the news. Most importantly, however, World War II claimed the lives of Joyce's mother and of her husband, Travis. The first died when Germans bombed her small town because it had a steel manufacturing plant, and the second died in Italy, just a few weeks before the end of the war.

American Colonization Society

Edward Williams sent Nash Williams to Liberia under the American Colonization Society. The society actually existed until 1964. Its full name was The Society for the Colonization of Free People of Color of America. Today, scholars argue about the extent of the society's colonization ambitions, its development of Liberia, and whether or not it was a racist society. The society closely monitored and controlled Liberia until its independence in 1847.

== Awards and nominations ==
- 1993 James Tait Black Memorial Prize (for fiction), the University of Edinburgh in Scotland recognizes the best literature written in the English language.
- 1994 Shortlisted Booker Prize, the Booker aims to reward the best novel of the year written by a British or Commonwealth author.
- 1994 Lannan Literary Award, the foundation strives "to honor both established and emerging writers whose work is of exceptional quality."
- 2000 Fellow of the Royal Society of Literature, the society rewards literary talent in the UK
- 2012 Best of the James Tait Black, shortlist.

== Radio adaptation ==
- Crossing the River, BBC Radio 3, 1985

== Publishing history ==
- 1993, UK, Bloomsbury Publishing (ISBN 0-679-40533-X), 18 January 1993, hardcover (first edition)
- 1995, USA, Vintage (ISBN 0-679-75794-5), 15 January 1995, paperback edition

== Sources, references, external links, quotations ==
- Caryl Phillips biographical information
- Purchasing Web site
- Metaphor of death and deliverance
- Village Voice literary reception information
- Boston Globe literary reception information
- Martin Luther King Jr.'s I Have a Dream Speech information
- Uncle Tom's Cabin information
- American Colonization Society information
- Awards information
- Adaptation information
