= A Living Dog =

2019 German film

A Living Dog is a 2019 German science fiction film directed by Daniel Raboldt. It was released in cinemas in the USA on October 8, 2021. It was released in the UK as A New World Order.

== Plot ==
The film takes place in a dystopia where a war between humans and combat drones has begun. Any communication between humans is impossible because machines have learned to respond to human voice frequencies. A deserter, Tomasz, flees from battle in a stolen vehicle into the wasteland of the Scandinavian forests, far away from the fighting. There, he meets a strong-willed Russian resistance fighter, Lilja, who has not yet given up hope. As the last survivor of her combat group, she desperately pursues a suicidal plan to win against the machines. In doing so, she not only puts herself in danger, but also lures the machines onto Tomasz's trail.

== Background ==
The film was shot in Lapland at midnight sun time in 2016. Because some scenes also required night shots, a few short shoots in North Rhine-Westphalia were added later. Since the enemy machines in the film react to human speech patterns, there is almost hardly any speaking in the film. Only two sentences are said in total, once in English and once in Russian.

== Festivals and awards ==
A Living Dog was shown at various international film festivals from 2019 to 2021 and received a total of 11 awards (including Best Science Fiction Film several times) and an additional 8 nominations. Its German premiere took place at the Berlin SciFi Film Festival in 2019 and was then shown in Germany at the Max Ophüls Prize 2020 film festival and the Snowdance Independent Film Festival 2020, among others.

== Reviews ==
The film received mostly good reviews in England, where the film is called A New World Order. The Guardian wrote "Still, A New World Order is atmospheric and integrates its digital effects with an unreal, anime-esque aplomb", but also pointed out that it suffers from a "muddy narrative". Elisabeth Vincentelli described the film as a “solid debut” in The New York Times.
