= Universal-Tandem Publishing =

British book publishing company

- Predecessor: Tandem Books
- Founded: 1968
- Successor: W. H. Allen & Co.
- Country of origin: United Kingdom
- Publication types: Books

Universal-Tandem Publishing Co Ltd was a United Kingdom paperback publishing company established in the early 1960s as Tandem Books.

== History ==
The company's principal imprint was Tandem. The hyphenated name Universal-Tandem was adopted as a corporate identity in 1968 after Tandem Books was bought by the American group Universal Publishing and Distribution Corporation Inc. (UPD), allowing Universal-Tandem to distribute some titles published by UPD in the United States in the United Kingdom.

In 1973, Tandem established Target Books as a children's imprint. Target became well known for its highly successful range of novelisations and other books based on the popular science-fiction television series Doctor Who.

In 1975, Universal-Tandem was sold by UPD to the British conglomerate Howard and Wyndham, and the company was renamed Tandem Publishing Ltd before being merged with the paperback imprints of Howard and Wyndham's general publishing house W H Allen to become Wyndham Publications Ltd in 1976. During 1977–1978, the Wyndham identity was phased out. The Tandem imprint was phased out during 1980, and surviving titles from the backlist were subsequently reprinted under W H Allen's principal paperback imprint, Star. The Target imprint survived until 1993, though in its latter years it was used only for Doctor Who novelisations.
