= Warwick Collins =

British writer (1948–2013)

Warwick Collins (born 14 December 1948 – 10 February 2013) was a British novelist, screenwriter, yacht designer, and evolutionary theorist. Collins was born in Johannesburg to English-speaking parents. His father, Robin Collins, was a novelist who wrote under the nom-de-plume Robin Cranford. Robin Collins's novels were written from a liberal perspective and one of them, My City Fears Tomorrow, was banned by the South African apartheid regime. When Collins was eleven, his family moved to England, and Collins entered The King's School, Canterbury. He continued his education at the University of Sussex, where he read Biology. He lived for many years in the Hampshire town of Lymington where he set two of his novels.

His early poetry was featured in Encounter between 1968 and 1971.

== A Silent Gene Theory of Evolution ==
Collins studied biology at The University of Sussex, where his tutor was the leading theoretical biologist John Maynard Smith. In 1975 Collins voiced to Maynard Smith the view that natural selection could not drive evolution because it always acted to reduce variation in favour of an optimum type for any environment, whereas the central story of evolution was that of increasing variation and complexity. Collins quoted Charles Darwin in The Origin of Species ("... unless profitable variations do occur, natural selection can do nothing."), and argued that if variation must always occur before natural selection can act, then variation, and not natural selection, drives evolution. He asked Maynard Smith whether he could search for a "strong" theory of variation. Maynard Smith warned Collins that he could not support his efforts to pursue a rival theory to the theory that natural selection drives evolution. Collins replied that he thought the object of science was to question and examine everything, including hallowed theories such as the theory of natural selection. Maynard Smith asserted that, on the contrary, the strength of science was its capacity to agree on certain principles, and act collectively to pursue agreed aims. This difference of view with his tutor made Collins give up his scientific career and pursue other interests instead.

== Other careers ==
After leaving university, Collins became a yacht designer and invented and patented the tandem keel, which was conceived to create high performance at low draft, but which also remains one of the radical keels in the America's Cup. He continued his interest in yacht design with an innovation in hull design called the Universal Hull. This fused together two classic hull types (the long, thin, easily driven hull and the beamy commodious hull) in a form which yielded the chief virtues of both types of hull. The two hulls are joined above the waterline by a ledge which also acts as a spray ledge. The resulting shape is easily driven because of the long, thin underwater shape but enjoys the accommodation space (above the waterline) of a beamy hull.

In the 1990s Collins turned to fiction, publishing three sailing novels and then a series of more wide-ranging novels, including two (The Rationalist and The Marriage of Souls) which are set in 18th century Lymington. He published ten novels in all.

Collins's political views were liberal and libertarian, but (in 1979) he was asked by Keith Joseph to join a Conservative party think tank chaired by John Hoskyns (who became Chief Political Adviser to Margaret Thatcher) to work on issues such as privatisation. Collins, though left of centre politically, always believed, in common with "classical liberals" such as Gladstone, that the free market is a superior means of distributing wealth than the state.

Collins's political views manifested themselves in his novel Gents (1996) which has recently been republished by The Friday Project, and was reviewed as an all-time classic in the Times (8 September 2007). Gents, which describes the lives of three West Indian immigrants who run a public urinal in London, is considered to be a leading fiction on tolerance. Collins claimed it was stimulated in part by his memories of apartheid when he lived as a child in South Africa.

Collins's other fictions include the somewhat luridly entitled Fuckwoman, a spoof on the superhero genre which details the adventures of a feminist vigilante who hunts down men who commit crimes against women. Set in Los Angeles, it also satirises the movie industry, contrasting Hollywood's emphasis on the image over reality. It has been published in French, German and Italian translations and recently in English as F-Woman.

His last novel was The Sonnets, a fictional account of William Shakespeare's life from 1592 to 1594, when the London theatres were closed by threat of plague, during which time many scholars believe that the main body of Shakespeare's sonnets were written.

Warwick Collins maintained an occasional blog at "www.publicpoems.com".

== Publications ==
Fiction

- Challenge (1990) (novel about the America's Cup, set in 2000)
- New World (1991) (sequel to Challenge)
- Death of an Angel (1992) (sequel, set in 2003)
- The Rationalist (1993) (set in 18th century England)
- Computer One (1993) (science fiction)
- Gents (1997, republished in 2007 by The Friday Project)
- The Marriage of Souls (1999) (Sequel to the Rationalist)
- Fuckwoman (published in French and German in 2002)
- The Sonnets (Warwick Collins) (2008)

Non-fiction

- A Silent Gene Theory of Evolution (2009)
