= Gents (novel) =

1997 novel by Warwick Collins

- First edition (publ. Marion Boyars)
- Author: Warwick Collins
- Publisher: Marion Boyars
- Publication date: April 1, 1997
- ISBN: 0-7145-3028-X

Gents is a 1997 novel by Warwick Collins. It is set in the unlikely environment of a "Gentlemen's" toilet, somewhere in London.

The story describes the lives of three West Indian immigrants who run a public urinal in London. Collins claimed it was stimulated in part by his memories of apartheid when he lived as a child in South Africa. The New York Times reviewer wrote: "Mr. Collins is able to express, deftly, several contrasting views of homosexuality. ..., resolves to make up his own mind about alternative life styles and does precisely that, with a mixture of love and logic."
