= Absolute Beginners (novel) =

1958 novel by Colin MacInnes

- First edition cover
- Author: Colin MacInnes
- Publisher: MacGibbon & Kee
- Publication date: 1959
- Publication place: United Kingdom
- Media type: Print (hardback and paperback)
- Pages: 223 pages (1st edition), & 208 pages (paperback)
- ISBN: 978-0-7490-0540-5 (paperback)
- OCLC: 45648228
- Preceded by: City of Spades
- Followed by: Mr. Love and Justice

Absolute Beginners is a novel by Colin MacInnes, written and set in 1958 London, England. It was published in 1959. The novel is the second of MacInnes' London Trilogy, coming after City of Spades (1958) and before Mr. Love and Justice (1960). Each novel is self-contained, with no shared characters.

== Introduction ==
Absolute Beginners is written from the first-person perspective of a teenage freelance photographer, who lives in a rundown yet vibrant part of West London he calls Napoli. The area is home to a large number of Caribbean immigrants, as well as English people on the margins of society, such as homosexuals and drug addicts.

The themes of the novel are the narrator's opinions on the newly formed youth culture and its fixation on clothes and jazz music, his love for his ex-girlfriend Crêpe Suzette, the illness of his father, and simmering racial tensions in the summer of the Notting Hill race riots.

== Plot summary ==
The novel is divided into four sections. Each details a particular day in the four months that spanned the summer of 1958.

In June takes up half of the book and shows the narrator meeting up with various teenaged friends and some adults in various parts of London and discussing his outlook on life and the new concept of being a teenager. He also learns that his ex-girlfriend, Suzette, is to enter a marriage of convenience with her boss, a middle-aged gay fashion designer called Henley.

In July has the narrator taking photographs by the river Thames, seeing the musical operetta H.M.S. Pinafore with his father, having a violent encounter with Ed the Ted and watching Hoplite's appearance on Call-Me-Cobber's TV show.

In August has the narrator and his father take a cruise along the Thames towards Windsor Castle. His father is taken ill on the trip and has to be taken to a doctor. The narrator also finds Suzette at her husband's cottage in Cookham.

In September is set on the narrator's 19th birthday. He sees this, symbolically, as the beginning of his last year as a teenager. He witnesses several incidents of racial violence, which disgust him. His father also dies, leaving him four envelopes stuffed with money. Suzette has separated from Henley, but still seems uncertain as to whether she should resume her relationship with the narrator. The narrator decides to leave the country and find a place where racism doesn't exist. At the airport, he sees Africans arriving and gives them a warm welcome.

== Characters ==
- The narrator (Blitz Baby)– a teenage photographer who lives in an attic flat in a building in London's W10 area; he makes most of his money by selling pornographic pictures, but is interested in having an exhibition of his other work. The name "Blitz Baby" was given to him by his mother, since he was born in a bunker during a blitz bombing.
- Crêpe Suzette – the narrator's ex-girlfriend who behaves promiscuously and who intends to enter into a sexless marriage with her boss.
- The narrator's parents – His mother runs a boarding house and prefers the company of her boarders to that of her second husband, the narrator's father. She has a stormy relationship with the narrator, who keeps a photographic darkroom at the house as an excuse to visit his father. His father has been writing a book called The History of Pimlico for several years.
- The Fabulous Hoplite – An occasional rentboy and part of the Knightsbridge-Chelsea set, who lives in the same building as the narrator.
- The Wizard – best friend of the narrator, a baby-faced sociopath who works as a pimp, and after a falling out, joins with the racist thugs during the riots.
- Henley – a gay fashion designer who claims to be 45 and who intends to marry Suzette.
- Verne – the 25-year-old half-brother of the narrator. He and the narrator do not have a great relationship, since they do not share the same ideals and butt heads about it.
- Mr. Cool – a young mixed-race man, born in London, who lives in the same building as the narrator and who is threatened by the local teddy boys to leave the area.
- Wilf – Mr. Cool's white half-brother.
- Call-me-Cobber – an Australian media celebrity and presenter of the ITV chat show Junction!
- The ex-Deb-of-Last-Year – a young, upper-class female friend of the narrator, who goes out with Call-me-Cobber.
- Ed the Ted – a pasty-faced teddy boy who has left his old gang and became part of a mob of racist hooligans.
- Zesty-Boy Swift – an unsuccessful pop singer who became a highly successful songwriter.
- Dido Lament – a gossip columnist.
- Big Jill – a lesbian in her 20s who lives in the basement flat of the narrator's building and who controls young, lesbian prostitutes.
- Dean Swift – one of the narrator's pornographic models, a junkie, and a lover of modern jazz.
- The Misery Kid – a devotee of old-style jazz.
- Mannie Katz – a poet friend of the narrator; married to Miriam and father of Saul.
- Vendice Partners – Dido's ex-lover who works at a Mayfair-based advertising agency.

The narrator also encounters a left-wing trade unionist called 'Ron Todd' in a jazz club. In 1985 a real-life trade unionist called Ron Todd became general secretary of the TGWU.

== Style ==
Although MacInnes turned 44 in the summer of 1958, the book is written through the eyes of an 18-year-old, who is part of the new vibrant and affluent London youth culture of coffee bars, modern jazz and rock 'n' roll music, and Italian scooters and clothes. As such, it chronicles the first years of what would become the mod subculture in the 1960s. MacInnes has the narrator use a very stylised form of speech. For example, when the narrator and Zesty-Boy talk about why Vendice no longer uses Dido's newspaper for advertising, MacInnes writes it as:

"And why has Partner's pimpery taken their custom away from Dido's toilet-paper daily?" I asked Zesty-Boy.
"It may be that Dido's slipping, or the paper's slipping, or just that everything these days is falling in the fat laps of the jingle kings."
"I wonder why Dido doesn't do a quick change and crash land in the telly casbah?"

The narrator is never given a name. When asked it by a girl at a party, he avoids the question. When pressed, he says, sarcastically, David Copperfield. He is variously addressed in the book as "blitz baby", "kid", "teenager", "child", "infant prodigy" and "son": all terms that emphasise his youth. The majority of the other characters are given nicknames or referred to by their job titles, rather than by their real names.

== Film adaptation ==
The novel was adapted into a musical film directed by Julien Temple and released in 1986. The narrator was given the name Colin, after Colin MacInnes, and was played by Eddie O'Connell. Patsy Kensit played Crêpe Suzette and David Bowie appeared as advertising man Vendice Partners. Bowie also wrote and performed the title song, which reached number 2 in the UK singles chart in March 1986.

The film used many of the characters of the book, but changed a lot of their motivations and the story's ending. It also made more use of the idea of older characters exploiting the young, which was merely hinted at in the novel.

The novel was republished by Penguin Books to tie in with the film's release. The cover showed O'Connell and Kensit in front of a stylised silhouette of the London skyline.

== Paul Weller ==
The singer-songwriter Paul Weller, who was born in 1958, has described the novel as "a book of inspiration". This quote was used on the cover of the 1986 paperback edition. Weller also chose the book when he appeared on the BBC Radio 4 programme Desert Island Discs.

His group The Jam released a single called "Absolute Beginners" in 1981. It reached number 4 in the UK charts. His second band, The Style Council, recorded the song "Have You Ever Had It Blue?" for the 1986 film.

== Release details ==
- 1959, UK, MacGibbon & Kee, 1959, unknown binding
- 1960, USA, Macmillan Publishers, 1960, hardcover
- 1961, USA, Ace Books, 1961, paperback
- 1966, UK, Hutchinson Educational (ISBN 978-0-09-077220-9), February 1966, hardcover
- 1970, UK, Ballantine Books (ISBN 978-0-345-21917-6), 12 April 1970, paperback
- 1973, UK, Panther (ISBN 978-0-586-03770-6), Pub date 29 November 1973, paperback
- 1980, UK, Allison & Busby (ISBN 978-0-85031-329-1), March 1980, hardcover
- 1980, UK, Allison & Busby (ISBN 978-0-85031-330-7), March 1980, paperback
- 1980, UK, Schocken Books (ISBN 978-0-8052-8039-5), September 1980, hardcover
- 1985, UK, E. P. Dutton (ISBN 978-0-525-48189-8), November 1985, paperback
- 1986, UK, Penguin Books (ISBN 978-0-14-002142-4), 27 February 1986, paperback
- 1992, UK, Allison & Busby (ISBN 978-0-7490-0165-0), 16 July 1992, paperback
- 2001, UK, Allison & Busby (ISBN 978-0-7490-0540-5), 14 March 2001, paperback
