= Colin MacInnes =

British writer (1914–1976)

- Born: Colin Campbell McInnes; 20 August 1914; London, England
- Died: 22 April 1976 (aged 61); Kent, England
- Occupations: Novelist, journalist
- Writing career
- Notable works: City of Spades, Absolute Beginners

Colin MacInnes (20 August 1914 – 22 April 1976) was an English novelist and journalist. He wrote his novels on black culture in England.

== Biography ==
MacInnes was born on 20 August 1914, in London, to singer James Campbell McInnes and novelist Angela Mackail, who was the granddaughter of the Pre-Raphaelite artist Edward Burne-Jones and also related to Rudyard Kipling and Stanley Baldwin. MacInnes's parents divorced in 1917. His mother remarried and the family relocated to Australia in 1920, living in Malvern, Melbourne. He attended Scotch College and, for much of his childhood, was known as Colin Thirkell, the surname of his mother's second husband. He had an older brother, Graham McInnes, and a younger half-brother, Lance Thirkell. At some point, he used his father's surname McInnes, afterwards changing it to MacInnes.

MacInnes worked in Brussels from 1930 until 1935, then studied painting in London at the London Polytechnic school and the School of Drawing and Painting in Euston Road.

MacInnes served in the British Intelligence Corps during World War II, and worked in occupied Germany after the European armistice. These experiences resulted in the writing of his first novel, To the Victors the Spoils. Soon after his return to England, he worked for BBC Radio until he could earn a living from his writing.

MacInnes was the author of a number of books depicting London youth and black immigrant culture during the 1950s, in particular City of Spades (1957), Absolute Beginners (1959) and Mr Love & Justice (1960), known collectively as the "London trilogy". Many of his books were set in the Notting Hill area of London, then a poor and racially mixed area. He was one of the first British authors to write about the black experience in England, as well as being one of the first to write about teenagers. A bisexual, he was one of the first to rationally write about homosexuality, which he called the "English Question"; he authored the pamphlet Loving Them Both in 1973.

In his later life, MacInnes lived in Fitzrovia with Martin Green, his publisher, and Green's wife, Fiona. He died on 22 April 1976, aged 61, in Kent, from lung cancer.

== Bibliography ==
=== Novels ===
- To the Victor the Spoils (MacGibbon & Kee, 1950; Allison & Busby, 1986)
- June in Her Spring (MacGibbon & Kee, 1952; Faber & Faber, 2008)
- City of Spades (MacGibbon & Kee, 1957; Allison & Busby, 1980)
- Absolute Beginners (MacGibbon & Kee, 1959; Allison & Busby, 1980)
- Mr Love & Justice (MacGibbon & Kee, 1960; Allison & Busby, 1980)
- All Day Saturday (MacGibbon & Kee, 1966)
- Westward to Laughter (MacGibbon & Kee, 1969)
- Three Years to Play (MacGibbon & Kee, 1970)
- Out of the Garden (HarperCollins, 1974)
- Fancy Free [unpublished novel (MS and typescript); gifted to Fiona Green, 1973]

=== Misc ===
- England, Half English (MacGibbon & Kee, 1961) – a collection of previously published journalism
- London, City of Any Dream (Thames & Hudson, 1962) – photo essay
- Australia and New Zealand (Time Life, 1964)
- Sweet Saturday Night: Pop Song 1840-1920 (MacGibbon & Kee, 1967) – a history of British music hall
- Loving Them Both: A Study of Bisexuality (Martin Brian and O'Keeffe, 1973)
- No Novel Reader (Martin Brian & O'Keeffe, 1975)
- Out of the Way: Later Essays (Martin Brian & O'Keeffe, 1980)

=== Anthologies ===
- Visions Of London (MacGibbon & Kee, 1969) [City of Spades/Absolute Beginners/Mr Love and Justice; republished as The London Novels/The Colin MacInnes Omnibus]
- Absolute MacInnes: The Best of Colin MacInnes (Ed. Tony Gould) (Allison & Busby, 1985)
