= Cultural depictions of Edward IV =

Edward IV of England has been depicted in popular culture a number of times.

== Literature ==
=== Plays ===
- The plays Henry VI, Part 2, Henry VI, Part 3, and Richard III, by William Shakespeare. In Henry VI, Part 2 Edward has a minor role. He comes in toward the end of the play to defend his father's claim to the English throne, and has only one line. In Henry VI, Part 3, Edward's role is heavily amplified and he has more lines than every character in the play besides Warwick. This play depicts Edward's rise to power, his marriage to the Lady Grey (history's Elizabeth Woodville), his betrayal by Warwick, his deposition, and his subsequent return to power. The play ends with the birth of his eldest son. In Richard III, Edward, now sick, tries to reconcile his squabbling nobles and relatives to little avail. In the play and the 1955 film Richard III, Edward's brother Richard directly hastens Edward's death, by informing the already ailing king that one of his brothers, George, Duke of Clarence is dead (Edward had revoked the order for Clarence's execution, but Richard has had Clarence secretly murdered).
- The plays King Edward IV, Part 1 and King Edward IV, Part 2, by Thomas Heywood, a contemporary of Shakespeare's.

=== Novels ===
(In alphabetical order, excluding 'The')

- The Assassin's Wife by Moonyeen Blakey (Describes Edward's relationship with Eleanor Butler)
- Daughter of York by Anne Easter Smith (The fictionalized story of his sister Margaret)
- The Founding, Volume 1 of The Morland Dynasty, a series of historical novels by author Cynthia Harrod-Eagles
- The Goldsmith's Wife by Jean Plaidy (A fictionalized story of his mistress Jane Shore)
- House of Echoes by Barbara Erskine (Ghost story about a mansion that is haunted by the spirit of Edward IV among others)
- The Innocent, The Exiled and The Beloved (released as The Uncrowned Queen) by Australian novelist, Posie Graeme-Evans
- The Kings Grace by Anne Easter Smith (Fictional portrayal of Edward's illegitimate daughter Grace)
- Kings of Albion by Julian Rathbone
- Knight Errant, Lady Robyn, and White Rose, a trilogy by R. Garcia y Robertson (Edward, Earl of March, falls in love with a woman who is a time-traveler from 21st century America)
- Mistress to the Crown by Isolde Martyn (The story of his mistress Jane Shore)
- Queen of Trial and Sorrow by Susan Appleyard (The story of Elizabeth Woodville)
- The Raven and the Rose, by Virginia Henley (a fictional illegitimate child of Edward IV is the main character)
- The Red Rose of Anjou by Jean Plaidy (The life of Queen Margaret of Anjou)
- I, Richard Plantagenet by J.P. Reedman (Fictional portrayal of Richard III life from childhood to Bosworth. Edward IV plays a prominent part throughout)
- The Reluctant Queen, by Jean Plaidy (a historical fiction novel from the point of view of Anne Neville, wife of Richard III)
- Royal Mistress by Anne Easter Smith (The story of his mistress Jane Shore)
- Sovereign, by C. J. Sansom (Fictional account, set in England in 1541, in which Edward IV is actually the son of a Kentish archer.)
- The Sun in Splendour by Jean Plaidy (A fictionalized story about Edward IV's life)
- The Sunne in Splendour, by Sharon Kay Penman (a historical fiction novel about the life of Richard III)
- Secret Marriages by J.P. Reedman (Fictional portrayal of Edward's two secret marriages to Eleanor Talbot and Elizabeth Woodville)
- This Sun of York by Susan Appleyard. A look at Edward IV's rise to the throne.
- Thwarted Queen by Cynthia Sally Haggard (A fictionalized biography of his mother Cecily Neville)
- Wars of the Roses, by Conn Iggulden (a historical fiction novel series about the Wars of the Roses)
- We Speak No Treason, by Rosemary Hawley Jarman (a historical fiction novel about Richard III as Duke of Gloucester)
- The White Queen, by Philippa Gregory (a historical fiction novel from the point of view of Edward's wife, Elizabeth Woodville
- Blood of Roses by J.P. Reedman (Fictional portrayal of Edward's victory at Mortimer's Cross and Towton)

== Film and television ==
(In date order)

Edward has been played on film and television by:

- Alfred Brydone in the silent short Richard III (1911), dramatising a part of Shakespeare's play
- Robert Gemp in the silent Shakespeare adaptation Richard III (1912)
- Roy Travers in the silent film Jane Shore (1915), an adaptation of the play The Tragedy of Jane Shore by Nicholas Rowe
- Ian Hunter in Tower of London (1939), a horror film loosely dramatising the rise to power of Richard III
- Cedric Hardwicke in Richard III, with Laurence Olivier. (Hardwicke was 62; Edward died at 40.)
- Julian Glover in the BBC series An Age of Kings (1960), which contained all the history plays from Richard II to Richard III
- Justice Watson in the remake of Tower of London (1962)
- Benno Sterzenbach in the West German TV version of Shakespeare's play König Richard III (1964)
- József Gáti in III. Richárd (1973), a Hungarian version of the Shakespeare play
- Brian Protheroe in the BBC Shakespeare versions of Henry VI, Part 2, Henry VI, Part 3 and The Tragedy of Richard the Third (1983)
- Marc Betton in a French film version of Richard III (1986)
- Roy Dotrice in the BBC series The Wars of the Roses (1989), which included all of Shakespeare's history plays performed by the Royal Shakespeare Company
- John Wood in Richard III (1995), with Ian McKellen as Richard
- Harris Yulin in the film documentary Looking for Richard (1996)
- John Rackham in Richard III (2005), a modernised version set on a Brighton housing estate
- Walter Williamson in Richard III (2007), a modern-day version
- Max Irons in the BBC drama series The White Queen (2013)
- Geoffrey Streatfeild in the BBC Shakespearian series The Hollow Crown (2016)
