= The Secret Woman =

The Secret Woman may refer to:

- The Secret Woman (film), a 1918 British silent drama film
- The Secret Woman (novel), a 1970 novel by Eleanor Hibbert
