= Thomas Allom =

English painter

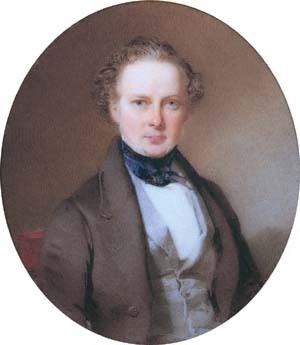
- Thomas Allom, 1846
- Born: 13 March 1804; Lambeth, London, England
- Died: 21 October 1872 (aged 68); Barnes, London, England
- Occupation: Architect
- Buildings: St Peter's Notting Hill
- Design: many Victorian churches

Thomas Allom (13 March 1804 – 21 October 1872) was an English architect, artist, and topographical illustrator. He was a founding member of what became the Royal Institute of British Architects (RIBA). He designed many buildings in London, including the Church of St Peter's and parts of the elegant Ladbroke Estate in Notting Hill. He also worked with Sir Charles Barry on numerous projects, most notably the Houses of Parliament, and is also known for his numerous topographical works, such as Constantinople and the Scenery of the Seven Churches of Asia Minor, published in 1838, and China Illustrated, published in 1845.

== Architect ==
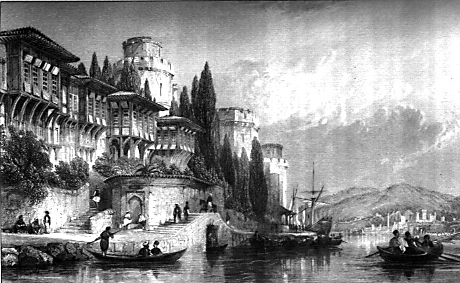
The Bosphorus, with the Castles of Europe & Asia by Allom. The original is a watercolor available in the online collection of the Victoria and Albert Museum.

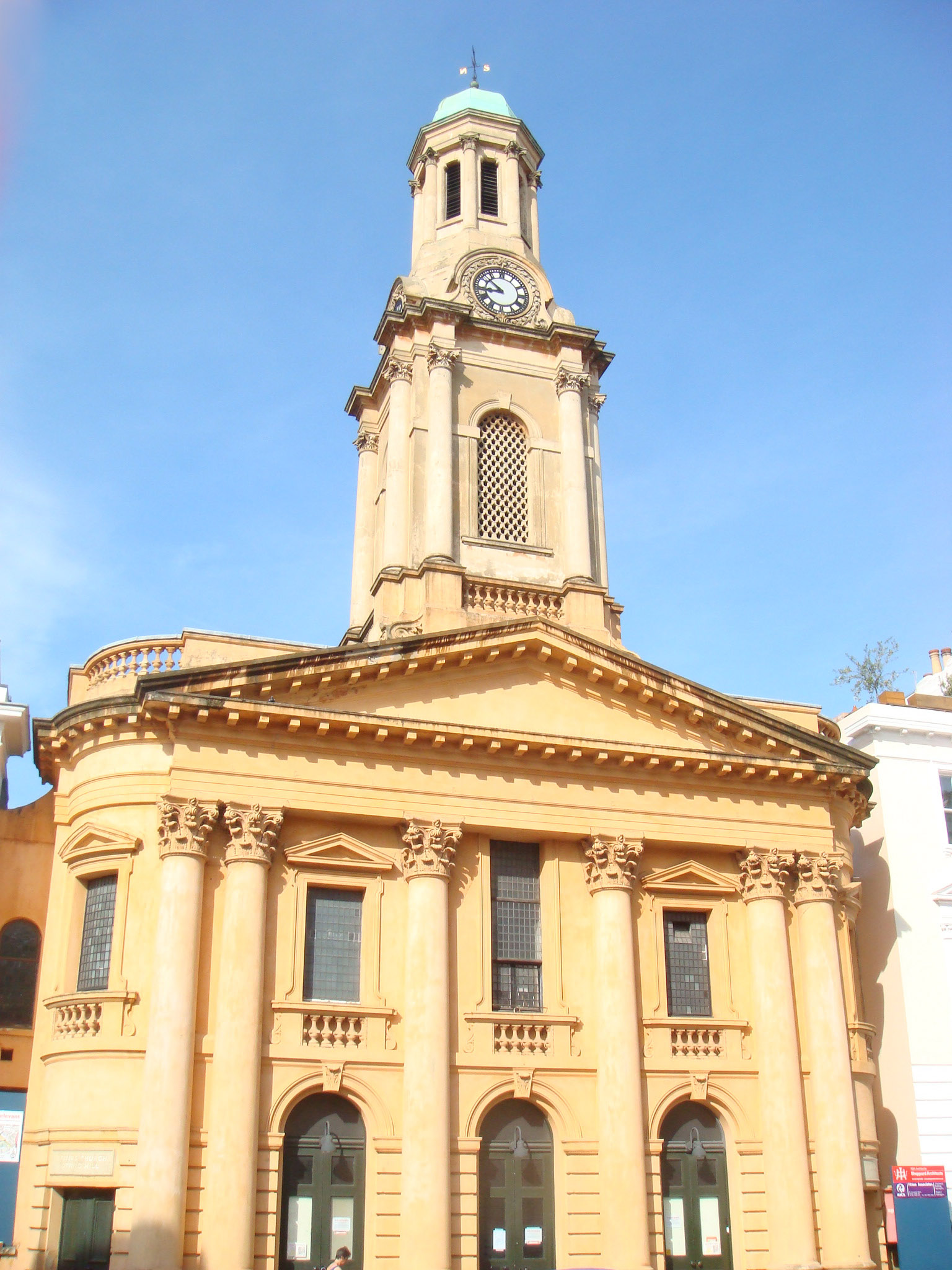
St Peter's Notting Hill, designed by Allom in the Italianate style

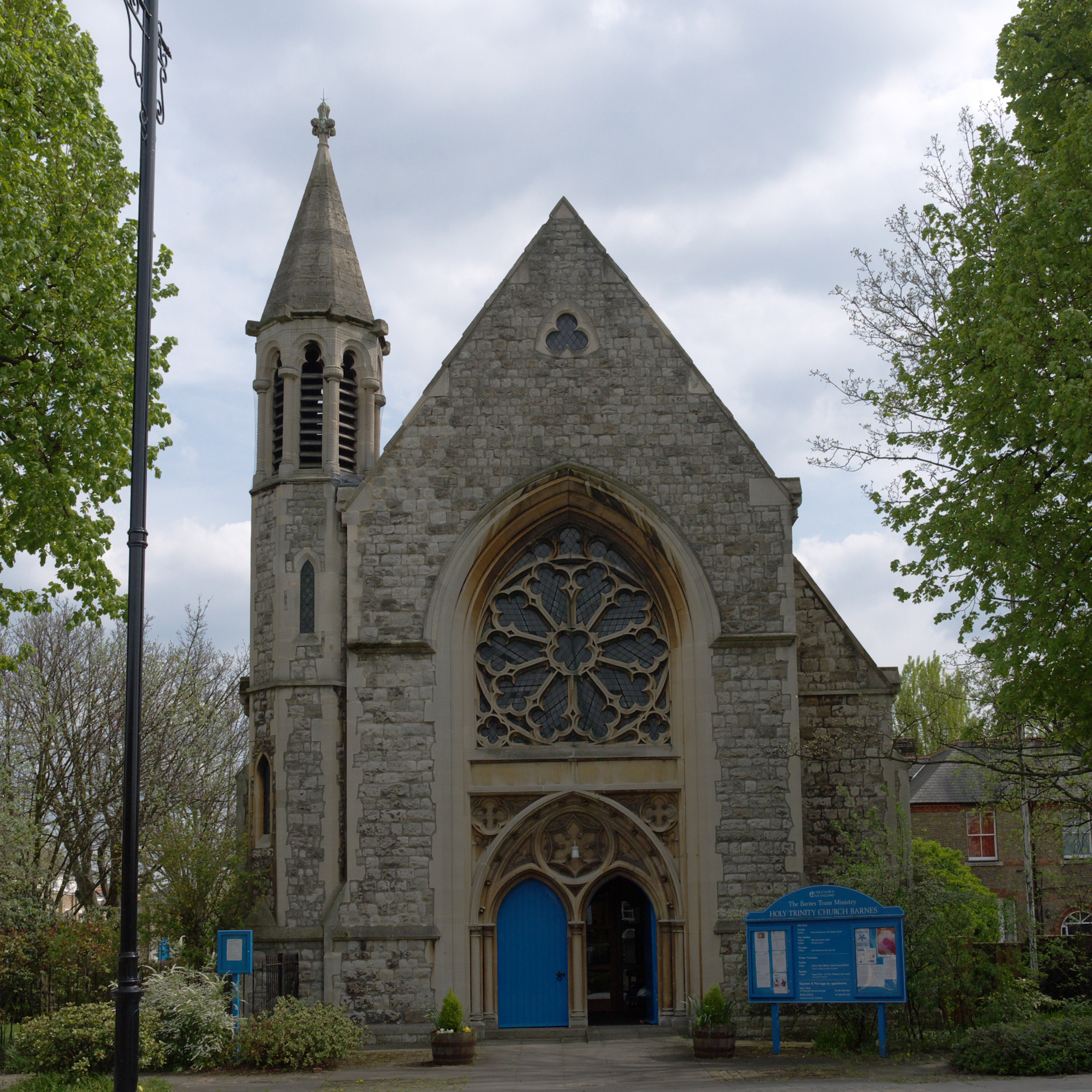
Holy Trinity Barnes, Allom's local church, which he designed and part-funded

He was born in Lambeth, south London, the son of a coachman from Suffolk. In 1819, he was apprenticed to architect Francis Goodwin for whom he worked until 1826. He then studied at the Royal Academy School. His designs for churches shown at exhibitions in 1824 and 1827 aroused considerable interest.

From 1834 to 1843, he worked in partnership with Henry Francis Lockwood in Hull, where they designed a number of Neo-classical buildings, such as Hull Trinity House (1839), extensions to Hull Royal Infirmary (1840) and Great Thornton Street Church (1843); the pair also designed the expansion of the Brownlow Hill workhouse in Liverpool (1842-1843).

Allom later designed many buildings in London, including a workhouse in Marloes Road, Kensington (1847), the Church of Christ in Highbury in 1850, the Church of St Peter's in Notting Hill in 1856, and parts of the Ladbroke Estate in west London. Further afield his works included workhouses at Calne, Wiltshire (1847) and in Liverpool, design of the William Brown Library also in Liverpool, (1857–1860), and the tower of St. Leodegarius Church, Basford near Nottingham (1860). He also worked with Sir Charles Barry on numerous projects, including the Houses of Parliament and the remodelling of Highclere Castle.

== Topographical illustrator ==
However, Allom is chiefly known for his numerous topographical works, which were used to illustrate books on travel. From the 1820s onwards, he travelled extensively through the UK and mainland Europe. In 1832 he published Westmorland, Cumberland, Durham and Northumberland Illustrated from Original Drawings by Thomas Allom (three volumes). In 1834 Allom arrived in Istanbul, Turkey, and produced hundreds of drawings during journeys through Anatolia, Syria and Palestine. The results of this expedition were published in 1838 in Constantinople and the Scenery of the Seven Churches of Asia Minor published in two volumes with text by Robert Walsh. Emily Reeve's Character and Costume in Turkey and Italy, published in London in 1840, was also illustrated with engravings by Allom. John Carne's Syria, the Holy Land, Asia Minor, &c. illustrated, published in London in 1836-1838, was in part illustrated with engravings by Allom. He is also remembered for numerous illustrations of China, published in China Illustrated in 1845. He also provided illustrations for "Family Secrets" by Mrs Ellis (1841) and E W Brayley's "A topographical history of Surrey" (1850).

== Final works ==
Allom, who lived at 1 Barnes Villas (now 80 Lonsdale Road), Barnes, suffered from a heart condition in his later years, and although he only retired in 1870, his artistic and architectural output slowed during the 1860s. In 1865 he was commissioned to design a mausoleum for former MP George Dodd in West Norwood Cemetery (Dodd, who died on 15 December 1864, was one of the Gentlemen of Her Majesty's privy chamber from 1844, and MP for Maidstone from 29 June 1841 to May 1853). In 1868 he designed Holy Trinity Barnes (in south west London), his local church to which he contributed £50 towards the cost of its construction.

Allom died aged 68 in Barnes, and was buried in Kensal Green Cemetery.

== Notable buildings ==
- St Peter's Notting Hill
- St. Leodegarius Church, Basford

== Gallery ==
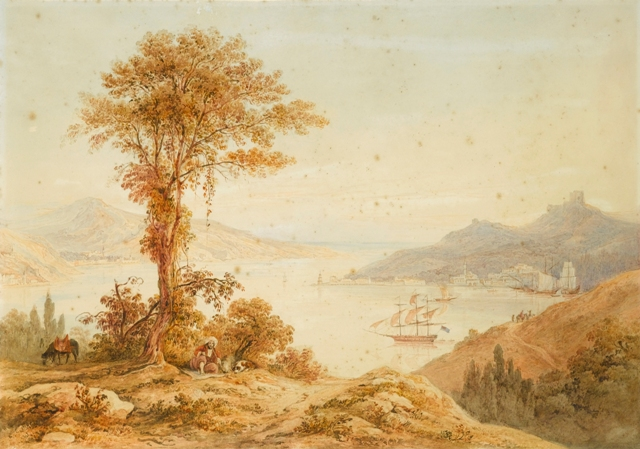
Ships on the Bosphorus at the Entrance to the Black Sea

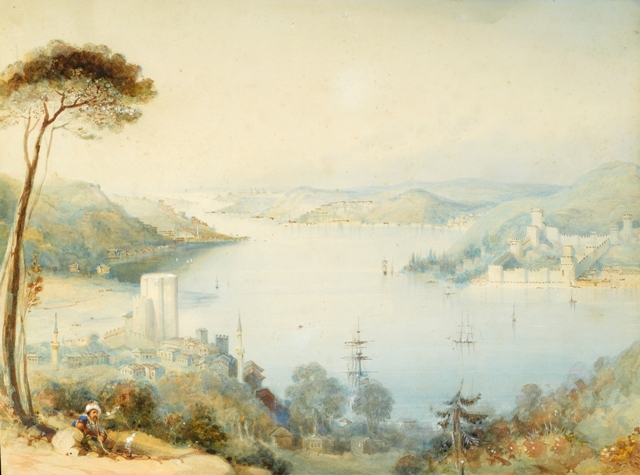
The Castles of Anadoluhisari and Rumelihisari on the Bosphorus.

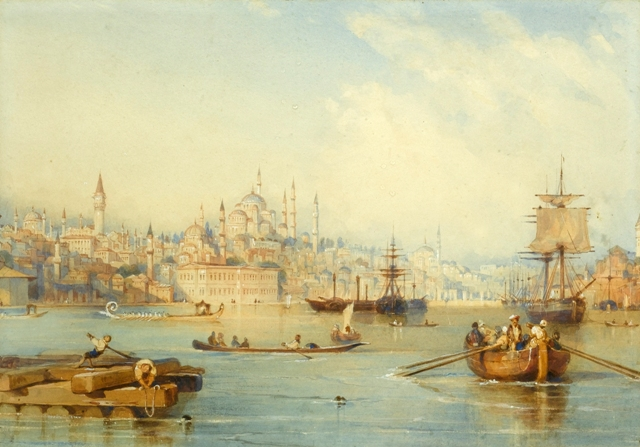
Constantinople from the Entrance of the Golden Horn.

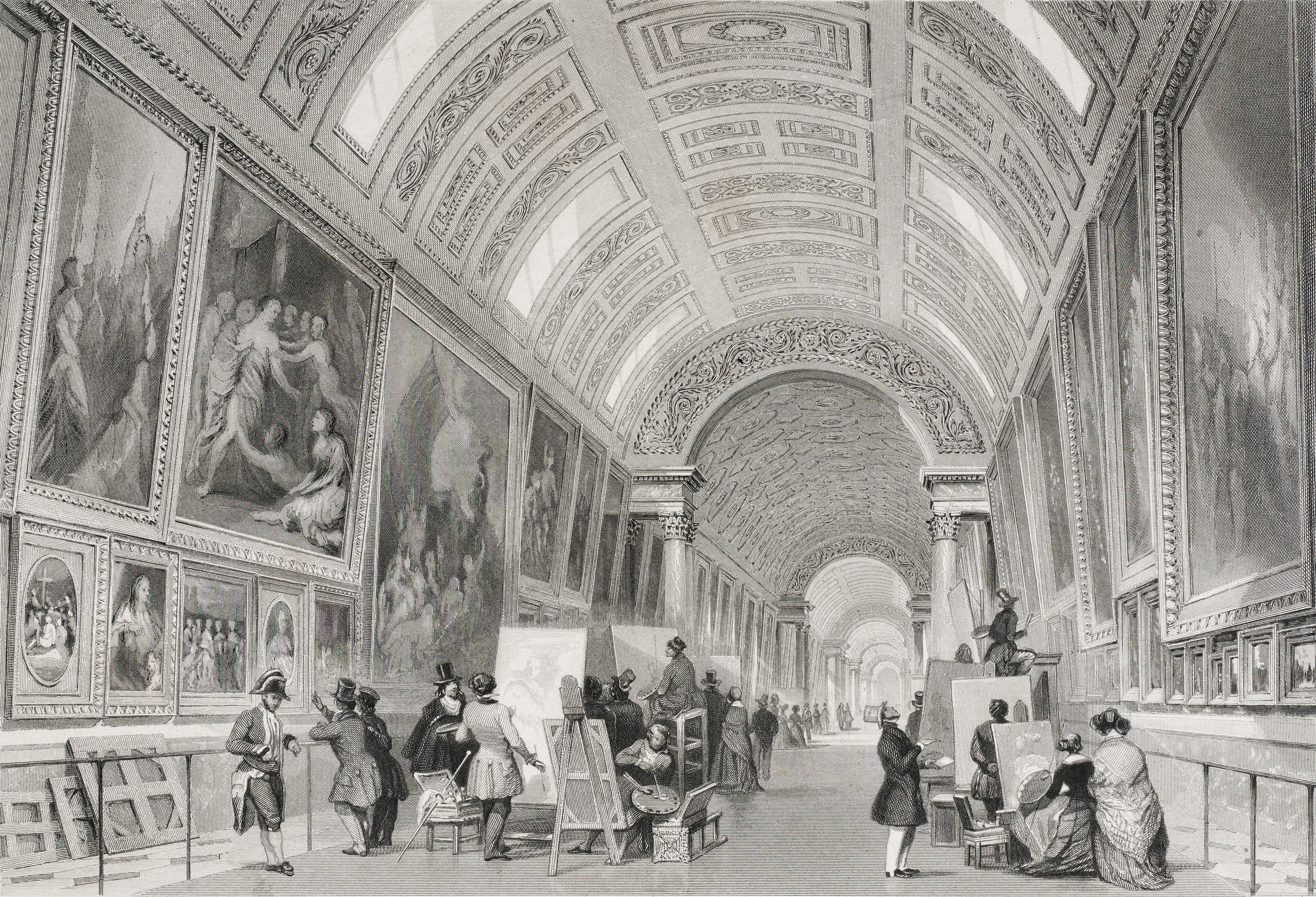
Grande Galerie Louvre
