= Eleanor Alice Burford =

English author (1906–1993)

- Born: Eleanor Alice Burford; 1 September 1906; Canning Town, London, England
- Died: 18 January 1993 (aged 86); At sea between Athens, Greece, and Port Said, Egypt
- Citizenship: British
- Occupation: Novelist
- Spouse: George Percival Hibbert
- Relatives: Joseph Burford (father); Alice Louise Tate (mother)
- Writing career
- Pen name: Jean Plaidy, Victoria Holt, Philippa Carr, Eleanor Burford, Elbur Ford, Kathleen Kellow, Ellalice Tate, Anna Percival
- Period: 1941–1993 (52 years)
- Genres: Historical fiction, Gothic fiction, Romantic fiction
- Notable awards: Romance Writers of America – Golden Treasure award 1989 Significant contribution to the romance genre

Eleanor Alice Hibbert (née Burford; 1 September 1906 – 18 January 1993) was an English writer of historical romances. She was a prolific writer who published several books a year in different literary genres, each genre under a different pen name: Jean Plaidy for fictionalized history of European royalty and the three volumes of her history of the Spanish Inquisition, Victoria Holt for gothic romances, and Philippa Carr for a multi-generational family saga. She also wrote light romances, crime novels, murder mysteries and thrillers under pseudonyms Eleanor Burford, Elbur Ford, Kathleen Kellow, Anna Percival, and Ellalice Tate.

In 1989, the Romance Writers of America gave her the Golden Treasure award in recognition of her contributions to the romance genre. By the time of her death, she had written more than 200 books that sold more than 100 million copies and had been translated into 20 languages. She continues to be a widely borrowed author among British libraries.

== Personal life ==
Map 1908, showing Eleanor Hibbert's birthplace Canning Town to the north of Royal Victoria Dock.

"I consider myself extremely lucky to have been born and raised in London, and to have had on my doorstep this most fascinating of cities with so many relics of 2000 years of history still to be found in its streets. One of my greatest pleasures was, and still is, exploring London."
—Eleanor Hibbert

"I found that married life gave me the necessary freedom to follow an ambition which had been with me since childhood; and so I started to write in earnest."
—Eleanor Hibbert

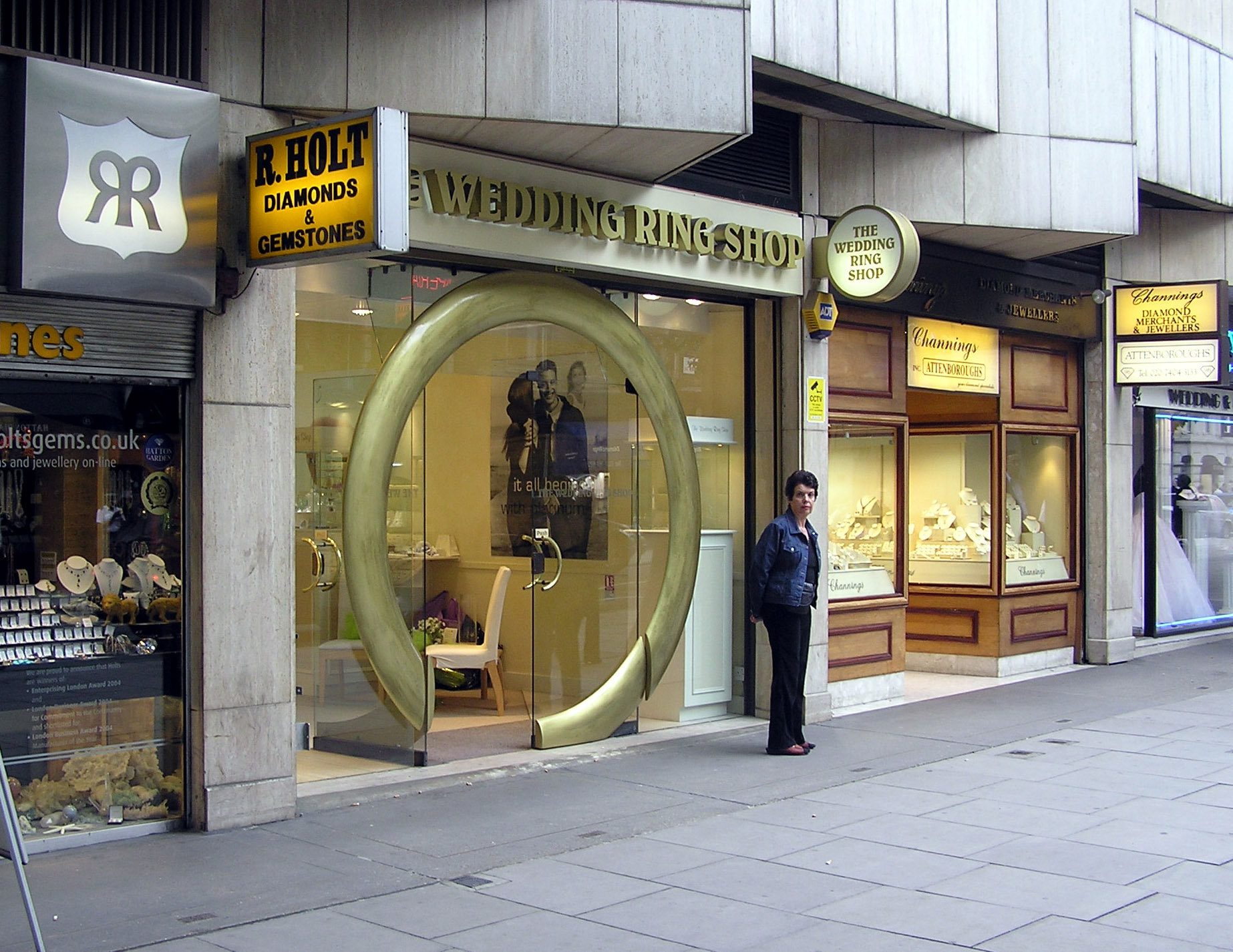
A shop in Hatton Garden, London's jewellery quarter and centre of the UK diamond trade. In the 1920s, Eleanor Hibbert worked for a jeweller in Hatton Garden, where she weighed gems and typed.

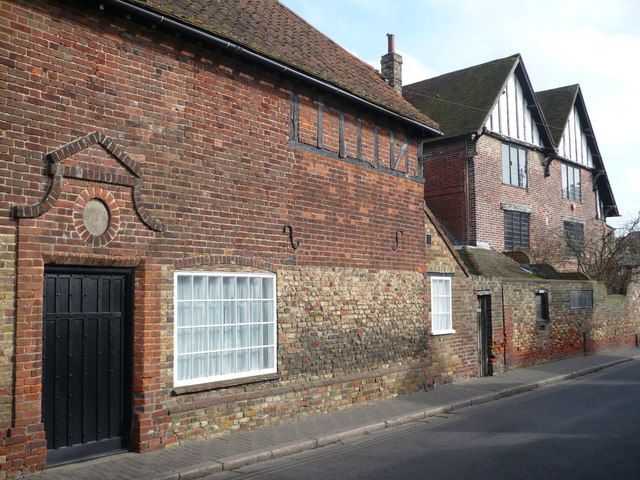
In the early 1970s, Eleanor Hibbert bought a historic house in Sandwich, Kent, and named it King's Lodging.

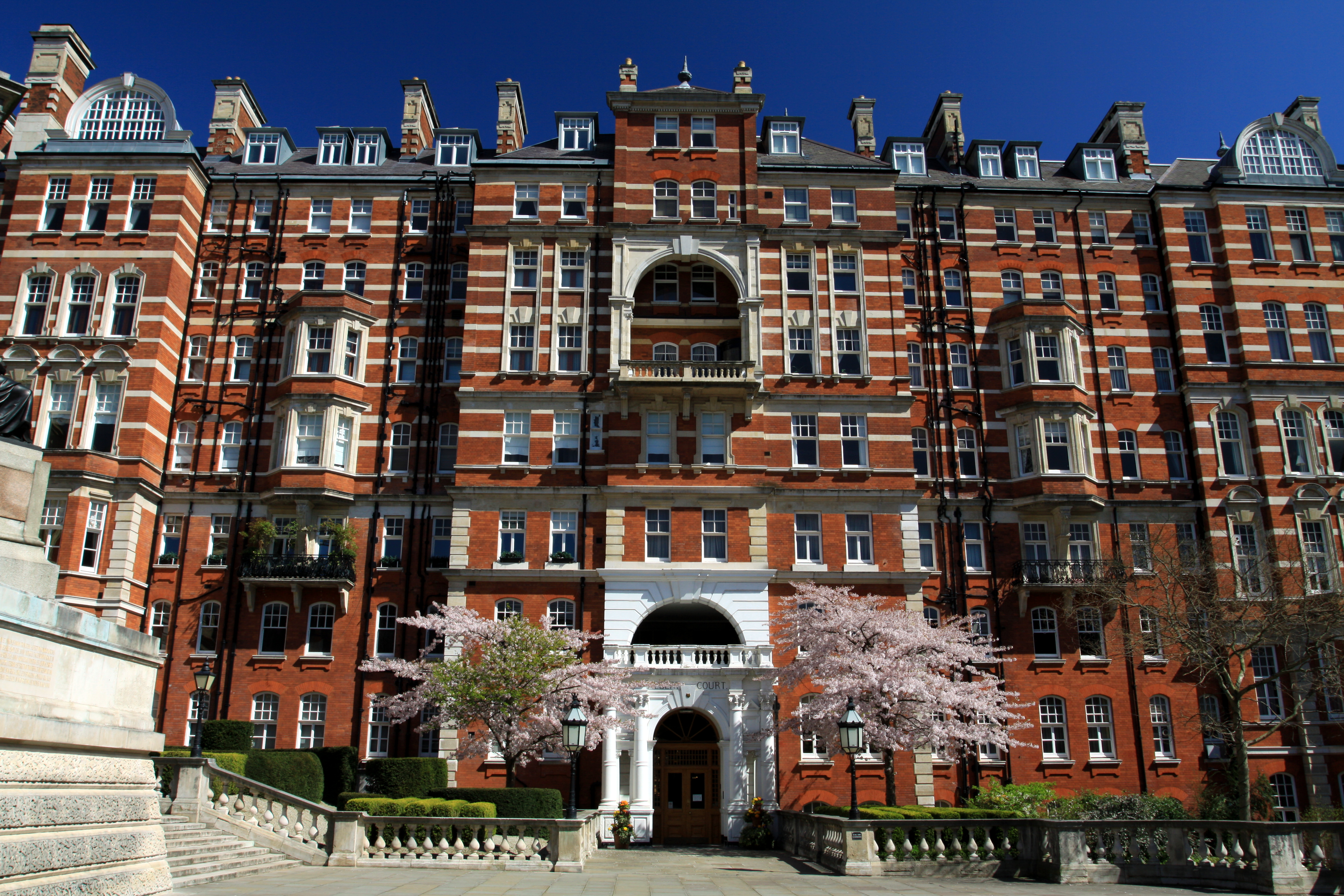
Eleanor Hibbert lived in a two-storey penthouse at Albert Court, Kensington Gore, close to the Royal Albert Hall, London.

"We spent the first night of our honeymoon in a country hotel, with Tudor architecture oak beams, and floors which sloped, of the Queen-Elizabeth-Slept-Here variety. There were old tennis-courts – the Tudor kind where Henry VIII was said to have played; and gardens filled with winter heather, jasmine and yellow chrysanthemums. [...] So that first night together was spent in the ancient bedroom with the tiny leaded paned windows, through which shafts of moonlight touched the room with a dreamlike radiance [...] "
—Eleanor Hibbert writing as Victoria Holt in The House of a Thousand Lanterns, 1974

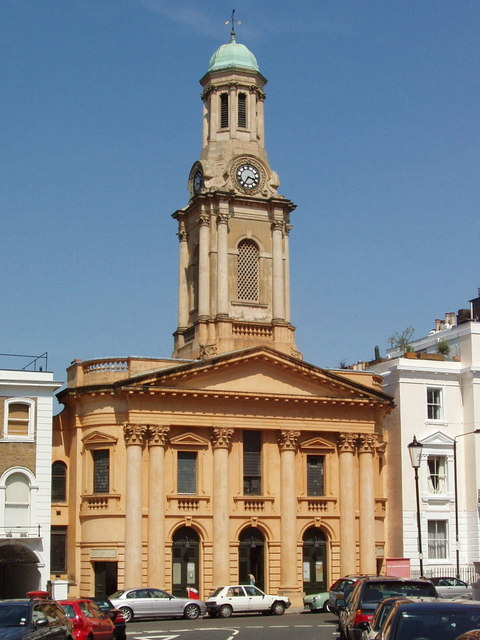
A memorial service was held for Eleanor Hibbert in March 1993 at St Peter's, Notting Hill Anglican church in Kensington Park Road, London.

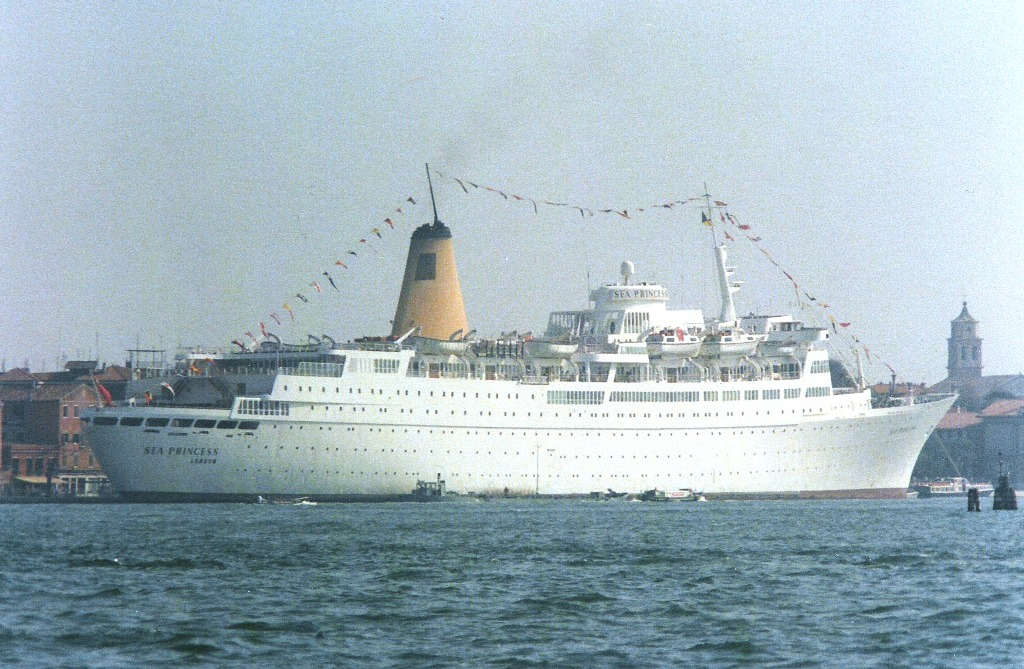
Eleanor Hibbert died aboard the cruise ship Sea Princess in 1993. (The ship is seen here in 1986 at Venice).

Hibbert was born Eleanor Alice Burford on 1 September 1906 at 20 Burke Street, Canning Town, now part of the London borough of Newham. She inherited a love of reading from her father, Joseph Burford, a dock labourer. Her mother was Alice Louise Burford, née Tate.

When she was quite young, ailing health forced her to be privately educated at home. At the age of 16 she went to a business college, where she studied shorthand, typewriting, and languages. She then worked for a jeweller in Hatton Garden where she weighed gems and typed. She also worked as a language interpreter in a café for French and German-speaking tourists.

In her early twenties, she married George Percival Hibbert (c. 1886–1966), a wholesale leather merchant about twenty years older than herself, who shared her love of books and reading. She was his second wife. During World War II, the Hibberts lived in a cottage in Cornwall that looked out over a bay called Plaidy Beach.

Between 1974 and 1978, Eleanor Hibbert bought a 13th-century manor house in Sandwich, Kent, that she named King's Lodging because she believed that it had served previously as lodging for English monarchs Henry VIII and Elizabeth I. The house had carved fireplaces and a staircase from the Tudor period. Hibbert restored the house and furnished it opulently but soon found it too big for her taste and too far from London.

She then moved to a two-storey penthouse apartment at Albert Court, Kensington Gore, London, that overlooked the Royal Albert Hall and Hyde Park. She shared her apartment with Mrs. Molly Pascoe, a companion who also travelled with her.

In 1985, Hibbert sold King's Lodging.

Hibbert spent her summers in her cottage near Plaidy Beach in Cornwall. To get away from the cold English winter, Hibbert would sail around the world on board a cruise ship three months a year from January to April. The cruise would take her to exotic destinations like Egypt and Australia, locations that she later incorporated into her novels. She sailed to Sydney aboard the cruise ship Oronsay in 1970, and the Canberra in 1978.

Towards the end of her life, her eyesight started failing.

Eleanor Hibbert died on 18 January 1993 on the cruise ship Sea Princess somewhere between Athens, Greece and Port Said, Egypt, and was buried at sea. A memorial service was later held on 6 March 1993, at St Peter's Anglican Church, Kensington Park Road, London.

== Writing career ==
=== Literary influences ===
"When I was 14 and living in London, I'd go around Hampton Court Palace with its marvellous atmosphere, through the gateway where Anne Boleyn walked, the haunted gallery down which Katherine Howard ran. It all set me going, it all started from there."
—Eleanor Hibbert

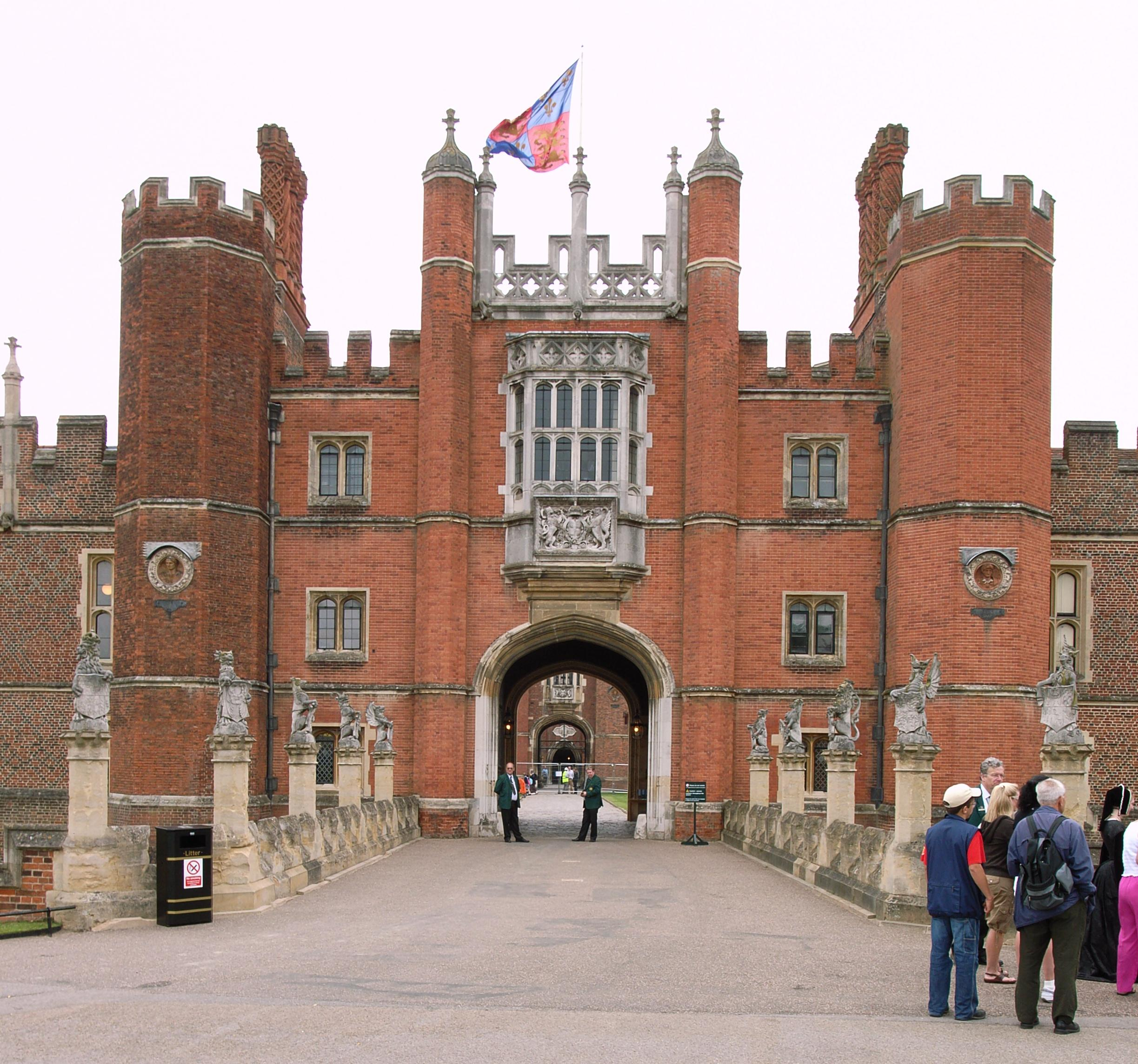
Hampton Court, London. View of the Great Gatehouse from the outside.

Eleanor Hibbert grew up in London. She first discovered her fascination for the past when she visited Hampton Court in her teenage years. After her marriage, Hibbert achieved the financial independence she needed to realise her desire to write. London's monuments and royal personalities filled Hibbert's historical novels. She was also influenced by her regular visits to British historic homes and their architecture.

"I'll sit in a room and think 'This is where Charles I was when he was on the run.' I feel the atmosphere all around me, and that's what I write about."
—Eleanor Hibbert

During World War II, the Hibberts lived in Cornwall, whose beaches, high cliffs and treacherous blue waters served as the setting for many of the Victoria Holt gothic novels.

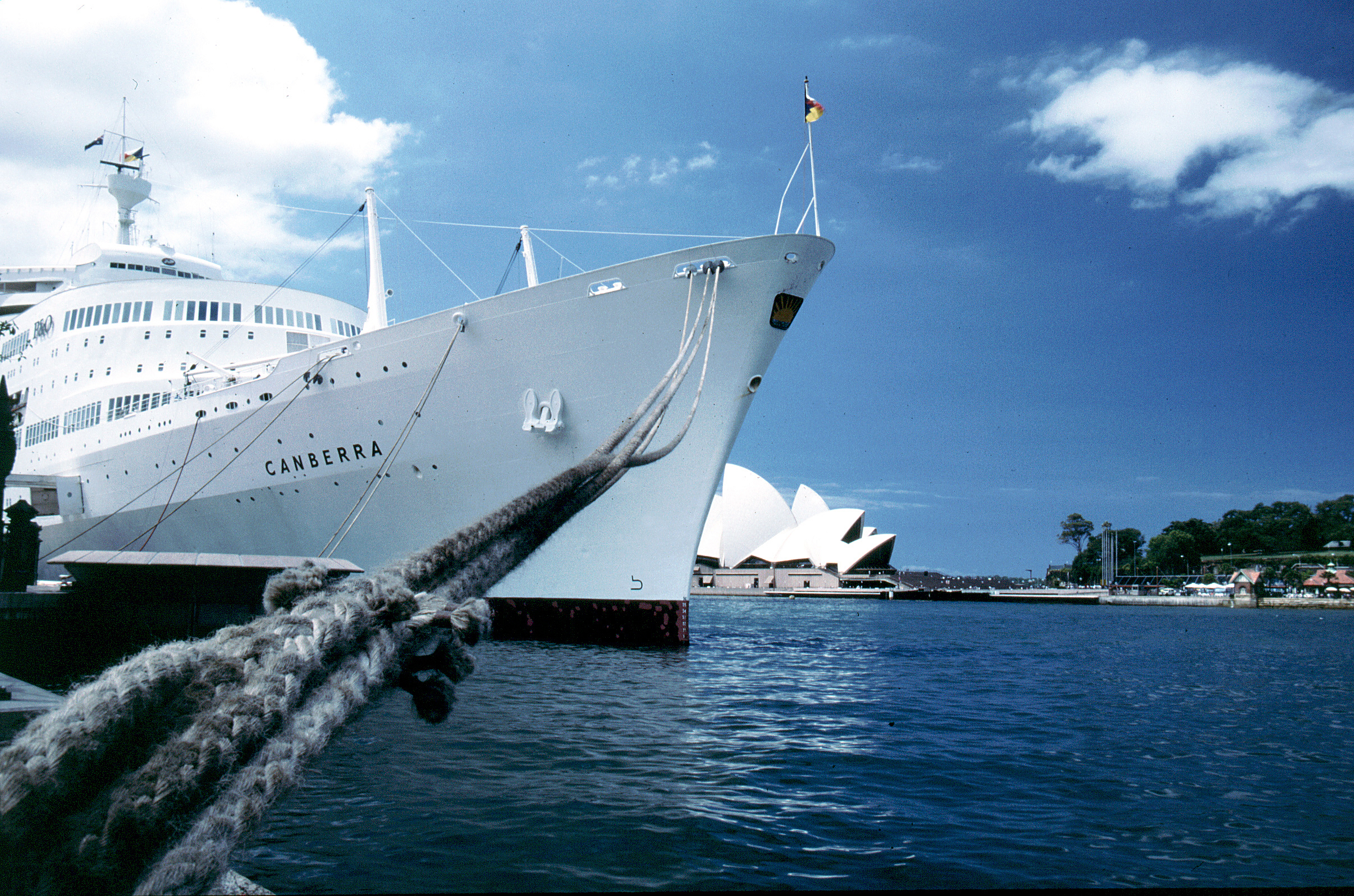
Eleanor Hibbert sailed to Sydney aboard the Canberra in 1978. (The ship is seen here in 2006 at Sydney.)

In later life, Hibbert took a world cruise every year. Her ship called in ports of countries like Turkey, Egypt, India, South Africa, Hong Kong, Ceylon and Australia. These exotic destinations serve as the backdrop in later Victoria Holt novels. In the late 1960s, Hibbert spent two months visiting the Australian goldfields 40 miles north of Melbourne, research for her 1971 Victoria Holt novel, The Shadow of the Lynx. In 1972, Hibbert travelled from Sydney to Melbourne via the Snowy Mountains and visited Hobart, Launceston, Geelong, Ballarat and Bendigo.

"I love my work so much that nothing would stop me writing. I never think of the money I'm making. When I finish one book I start on the next. If I take even a week's break I just feel miserable. It's like a drug.
—Eleanor Hibbert

"If anybody says to me 'you look tired,' it's because I haven't been able to get at my typewriter. Writing excites me. I live all my characters and never have any trouble thinking of plots of how people would have said something because I'm them when I'm writing.
—Eleanor Hibbert

Hibbert's Philippa Carr novels were based partly in Cornwall and partly in Australia.

Hibbert was influenced in her writing by the Brontës (especially the novel Jane Eyre), George Eliot, Charles Dickens, Victor Hugo, and Leo Tolstoy.

=== Early work ===
During the 1930s, Hibbert wrote nine long novels (each about 150,000 words in length), all of them serious psychological studies of contemporary life. However, none of these was accepted for publication. At the same time, she wrote short stories for newspapers including the Daily Mail and Evening News. Some also appeared in The Star, Woman's Realm and Ladies' Home Journal. The turning point came when the fiction editor of the Daily Mail told her, "You're barking up the wrong tree: you must write something which is saleable, and the easiest way is to write romantic fiction."

Hibbert read 50 romance novels as research and then published her first fiction book, Daughter of Anna, in 1941. It was a period novel set in Australia of the late 18th and 19th centuries. It was a moderate success and Hibbert received £30 as advance for it. The book was published under her maiden name, Eleanor Burford, which was also used for her contemporary novels. Following the success of the book, Hibbert was contracted by Herbert Jenkins publishers to write one book a year. By 1961 Hibbert had published 31 novels under this name, including ten romance novels for Mills & Boon.

=== Pseudonyms ===
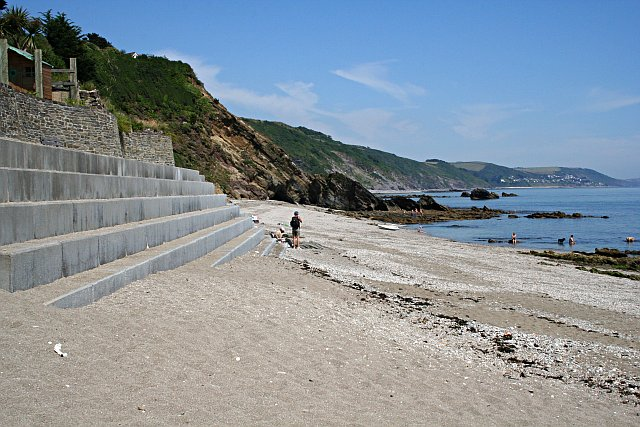
Plaidy Beach near Looe, Cornwall

In 1945, she chose the pseudonym Jean Plaidy for her new novel Together They Ride at the request of her agent. The name was inspired by Plaidy Beach near the Hibberts' home in Looe, Cornwall during World War II. Her agent suggested the first name, saying "Jean doesn't take much room at the back of the book". The book was published by Gerald G. Swan, a London publisher. The next book written under the Jean Plaidy pseudonym was Beyond the Blue Mountains in 1948. The publisher Robert Hale accepted the 500-page manuscript after it had been rejected by several others. The firm wrote to Hibbert's literary agency, A.M. Heath, "Will you tell this author that there are glittering prizes ahead for those who can write as she does?". In 1949, Hibbert hit her stride with the first Jean Plaidy novel that fictionalized stories of royalty: The King's Pleasure, featuring Henry VIII and Anne Boleyn. A total of 91 Jean Plaidy novels were published. Hibbert's last Jean Plaidy book, The Rose Without a Thorn, was published posthumously.

Hibbert also wrote four non-fiction books under the pseudonym Jean Plaidy. The first, A Triptych of Poisoners (1958), was a collection of short biographies of poisoners: Cesare Borgia, Marie d'Aubray and Edward William Pritchard. The other three were a trilogy on the Spanish Inquisition: The Rise (1959), The Growth (1960) and The End (1961).

From 1950 to 1953, Hibbert wrote four novels as Elbur Ford, a pen name derived from her maiden name, Eleanor Burford. These novels were based on real-life murderers of the nineteenth century: Edward William Pritchard (Flesh and the Devil, 1950); Adelaide Bartlett (Poison in Pimlico, 1950); Euphrasie Mercier (The Bed Disturbed, 1952) and Constance Kent (Such Bitter Business, 1953 – published in the U.S. in 1954 under the title Evil in the House).

Between 1952 and 1960, Hibbert used the pseudonym Kathleen Kellow to write eight novels that were mostly crime and mystery fiction. From 1956 to 1961, she wrote five novels as Ellalice Tate, a pseudonym inspired by her mother's name, Alice Tate.

"I've always wanted to write a best-seller. Every writer does. It's really a matter of finding out what the public wants.
—Eleanor Hibbert

In 1960, at the suggestion of her agent, Patricia Schartle Myrer, she wrote her first Gothic romance, Mistress of Mellyn, under the name Victoria Holt. The pseudonym was created by choosing the name Victoria for its regal, romantic ring while the name Holt was taken from the military bank of Holt & Company where Hibbert had an account. Published by Doubleday in the United States and Collins in the United Kingdom, Mistress of Mellyn became an instant international bestseller and revived the Gothic romantic suspense genre.

"I have heard her name mentioned in connection with mine and I think it is because we both lived in Cornwall and have written about this place. Rebecca is the atmospheric suspense type of book mine are. But I don't think there is much similarity between her others and mine."
— Victoria Holt commenting on the similarity between Daphne du Maurier's novels and her own.

Mistress of Mellyn was a clever weaving of elements from earlier Gothic novels such as Jane Eyre (1847), The Woman in White (1859), and Rebecca (1938). Its setting in Cornwall made the resemblance to Rebecca (1938) so remarkable that it was speculated that Victoria Holt was a pseudonym for Daphne du Maurier. After six Victoria Holt novels were published over eight years, it was revealed that Hibbert was the author. Hibbert wrote a further 31 novels as Victoria Holt, primarily portraying fictitious characters set against an authentic period background, usually of the late 19th century. The last Victoria Holt novel, The Black Opal, was published after her death.

In 1960, Hibbert wrote a novel under the name Anna Percival, a pseudonym inspired by her husband's middle name, Percival. Hibbert never used that pen name again.

She created her last pseudonym, Philippa Carr, in 1972 at the suggestion of her publisher, Collins, to create a new series showing successive generations of English gentlewomen involved in important historical events starting with the Reformation and ending with World War II.

Hibbert continued to use the pseudonym Jean Plaidy for her historical novels about the crowned heads of Europe. Her books written under this pseudonym were popular with the general public and were also hailed by critics and historians for their historical accuracy, quality of writing, and attention to detail.

View source data.

Decade	Eleanor Burford	Jean Plaidy	Elbur Ford	Kathleen Kellow	Ellalice Tate	Anna Percival	Victoria Holt	Philippa Carr	Total
1940s	9	4							13
1950s	19	19	4	7	4				53
1960s	3	26		1	1	1	8		40
1970s		22					10	5	37
1980s		16					10	9	35
1990s		4					4	5	13
Total	31	91	4	8	5	1	32	19	191
^{Note} The numbers here reflect single novels originally published under the pseudonym. Later reprints under a different title and/or pseudonym are not included. Omnibus editions and anthologies are also not included.

=== Research ===
Hibbert based her research on the writings of British historians such as John Speed, James Anthony Froude, Alexander Fraser Tytler and Agnes Strickland.

Each of Hibbert's Jean Plaidy books featured a bibliography at the end, listing the historical works consulted during the process of writing the book.

The Kensington Central Library gave Hibbert special concessions to aid her research. She was allowed to go down to the vault where the out-of-circulation books were stored, and borrow them a trolley-load at a time. She was even allowed to take the books home and keep them as long as she wanted.

When her eyesight started failing towards the end of her life, she borrowed audiobooks from the Westminster City Council public libraries.

=== Writing discipline ===
Hibbert was a prolific writer, churning out multiple books in a year under different pseudonyms, chiefly Jean Plaidy, Victoria Holt and Philippa Carr. Jean Plaidy proved very popular in the United Kingdom, selling large quantities in paperback while Victoria Holt was a bestseller in the United States. Many of her readers never realized that behind all these pen names was a single author.

Hibbert attributed her large output to her regular working habits. She described herself as a compulsive writer and would write all seven days in the week. She started every morning at the typewriter on her desk, usually completing five thousand words by lunchtime. Though writing stimulated her, she found the typewriter to be a physical strain. She devoted five hours every day to her writing, in addition to the time that it took her to proof-read her draft and conduct research. In the afternoon, she would personally answer all the fan mail she received. She would also spend time at Kensington Central Library. In the evening, she played chess if she could find an opponent or attended social engagements.

Even while on her annual cruise around the world, Hibbert maintained her discipline. She wrote in the mornings, played chess in the afternoons, and joined in the shipboard entertainments in the evenings. She preferred to work on her Victoria Holt novels while on board the cruise ship because they did not require as much research or fact-checking at a library.

=== Literary agents and publishers ===
Eleanor Hibbert retained her literary agents and publishers throughout her professional life. She was represented in the United Kingdom by A.M. Heath Literary Agency and by McIntosh & Otis in the United States. Her long-time American agent was Patricia Schartle Myrer followed by Julie Fallowfield.

London publisher Herbert Jenkins published 20 light romantic novels from 1941 to 1955 that Hibbert wrote under the pen name Eleanor Burford. The contract, initially for one book a year at an advance of £30 a title, was later revised to two books a year when the books proved successful.

Mills and Boon, a London publisher that specialised in low-priced, paperback, romantic novels brought out 10 romance novels from 1956 to 1962 that Hibbert wrote under the pen name Eleanor Burford.

Gerald G Swan published the first Jean Plaidy book in 1945 but every one after that was published by Robert Hale. Starting with Beyond the Blue Mountains (1948) and extending over the entire course of her lifetime, Robert Hale published a total of 90 Jean Plaidy books in hardcover with dust jackets illustrated by specialist artist Philip Gough.

MacRae Smith Co. of Philadelphia published Jean Plaidy titles in the United States. Foreign language editions of Jean Plaidy books began appearing in 1956: in French by Éditions Robert Laffont, Paris; in Spanish by Guillermo Kraft Limitada, Buenos Aires; and in Dutch by Uitgeverij A.J. Luitingh, Amsterdam.

In 1951, Canadian paperback publishers Harlequin reprinted Jean Plaidy's Beyond the Blue Mountains in paperback to achieve their greatest commercial success to that date: of the 30,000 copies sold, only 48 were returned.

Robert Hale published eight Kathleen Kellow crime and mystery novels between 1952 and 1960 in hardcover with dust jackets by Philip Gough. Robert Hale also published the sole book written under the Anna Percival pseudonym, The Brides of Lanlory.

From 1950 to 1953, four Elbur Ford crime novels were published by London publisher William Morrow in the United Kingdom and New York publisher Werner Laurie in the United States.

From 1956 to 1961, Hodder & Stoughton published all five historical novels written under the pseudonym Ellalice Tate.

From 1960 to 1993, Hibbert wrote 32 Victoria Holt novels for the publishing giants Collins in the United Kingdom and Doubleday in the United States. Many of them were bestsellers and were translated into 20 languages to reach a worldwide audience.

From 1972 to 1993, Hibbert wrote 19 Philippa Carr novels that were published by Collins in the United Kingdom and Putnam in the United States. A few of them were later translated into foreign languages such as Spanish, Finnish, Russian and Polish.

By the time of her death in 1993, Hibbert had sold 75 million books translated in 20 languages under the name Victoria Holt, 14 million under the name Jean Plaidy and 3 million under the name Philippa Carr.

After her death, Mark Hamilton of the A.M. Heath Literary Agency took over as executor for her literary estate, estimated to be worth about £8,790,807 at probate.

== Eleanor Burford ==
=== Romance novels ===
1. Daughter of Anna (1941)
2. Passionate Witness (1941)
3. The Married Lover (1942)
4. When the Entire World Is Young (1943)
5. So the Dreams Depart (1944)
6. Not in Our Stars (1945)
7. Dear Chance (1947)
8. Alexa (1948)
9. The House at Cupid's Cross (1949)
10. Believe the Heart (1950)
11. The Love Child (1950)
12. Saint or Sinner (1951)
13. Bright Tomorrow (1952)
14. Dear Delusion (1952)
15. Leave Me My Love (1953)
16. When We Are Married (1953)
17. Castles in Spain (1954)
18. Heart's Afire (1954)
19. Two Loves in Her Life (1955)
20. When Other Hearts (1955)

The book The Love Child published in 1950 by Eleanor Burford must not be mistaken for the same-titled novel by Philippa Carr published in 1978 as part of the Daughters of England Series.

=== Mills & Boon novels ===
1. Begin to Live (1956)
2. Married in Haste (1956)
3. To Meet a Stranger (1957)
4. Blaze of Noon (1958)
5. Pride in the Morning (1958)
6. Red Sky at Night (1959)
7. The Dawn Chorus (1959)
8. Night of Stars (1960)
9. Now That April's Gone (1961)
10. Who's Calling? (1962)

=== The Mary Stuart Queen of Scots Series ===
- Royal Road to Fotheringay (1955) (later re-published under the Jean Plaidy name)

== Jean Plaidy ==
Many Jean Plaidy books were published under different titles in the United States. Her trilogies were also later re-published as single books, often under different titles than those shown.

=== Single novels ===
1. Together They Ride (1945)
2. Beyond the Blue Mountains (1948)
3. The King's Pleasure (1949) (a.k.a. Murder Most Royal in the Tudor Saga)
4. The Goldsmith's Wife (1950) (a.k.a. The King's Mistress)
5. Daughter of Satan (1952)
6. Lilith (1954)
7. Melisande (It Began in Vauxhall Gardens) (1955)
8. The Scarlet Cloak (1957)
9. The Queen of Diamonds (1958)
10. Milady Charlotte (1959)
11. Evergreen Gallant (1965)
12. Defenders of the Faith (1971)
13. Madame du Barry (1994)
14. The King's Adventurer (1996) (originally This Was a Man by Ellalice Tate)

=== Omnibus ===
- Katharine of Aragon (omnibus of novels 2 – 4 in The Tudor Saga)
- Catherine De Medici (1969)
- Charles II (omnibus of novels 2 – 4 in The Stuart Saga)
- Isabella and Ferdinand (1970)

=== The Tudor Saga ===
1. Uneasy Lies the Head (1982) (a.k.a. To Hold the Crown)
2. Katharine, the Virgin Widow (1961)
3. The Shadow of the Pomegranate (1962)
4. The King's Secret Matter (1962)
5. Murder Most Royal (1949) (a.k.a. The King's Pleasure)
6. Saint Thomas' Eve (1954) (a.k.a. The King's Confidante)
7. The Sixth Wife (1953)
8. The Thistle and the Rose (1963)
9. Mary, Queen of France (1964)
10. The Spanish Bridegroom (1954) (a.k.a. For a Queen's Love)
11. Gay Lord Robert (1955) (republished as Lord Robert (UK) in 2007 and A Favorite of the Queen (US) in 2010)

=== The Catherine De Medici Trilogy ===
1. Madame Serpent (1951)
2. The Italian Woman (1952) (a.k.a. The Unholy Woman)
3. Queen Jezebel (1953)

=== The Mary Stuart, Queen of Scots Series ===
- Royal Road to Fotheringay (1955) (first published as being by Eleanor Burford)
- The Captive Queen of Scots (1963)

=== The Stuart Saga ===
1. The Murder in the Tower (1964)
2. The Wandering Prince (1956)
3. A Health Unto His Majesty (1956)
4. Here Lies Our Sovereign Lord (1957)
5. The Three Crowns (1965)
6. The Haunted Sisters (1966)
7. The Queen's Favourites (1966) (a.k.a. Courting Her Highness)

=== The French Revolution Series ===
- Louis the Well Beloved (1959)
- The Road to Compiègne (1959)
- Flaunting, Extravagant Queen (1957)

=== The Lucrezia Borgia Series ===
- Madonna of the Seven Hills (1958)
- Light on Lucrezia (1958)

=== The Isabella and Ferdinand Trilogy ===
- Castile for Isabella (1960)
- Spain for the Sovereigns (1960)
- Daughters of Spain (1961) (a.k.a. Royal Sisters)

=== The Georgian Saga ===
1. The Princess of Celle (1967)
2. Queen in Waiting (1967)
3. Caroline, the Queen (1968)
4. The Prince and the Quakeress (1975)
5. The Third George (1969)
6. Perdita's Prince (1969)
7. Sweet Lass of Richmond Hill (1970)
8. Indiscretions of the Queen (1970)
9. The Regent's Daughter (1971)
10. Goddess of the Green Room (1971)
11. Victoria in the Wings (1972)

=== The Queen Victoria Series ===
1. The Captive of Kensington Palace (1972)
2. The Queen and Lord M (1973)
3. The Queen's Husband (1973)
4. The Widow of Windsor (1974)

=== The Norman Trilogy ===
- The Bastard King (1974)
- The Lion of Justice (1975)
- The Passionate Enemies (1976)

=== The Plantagenet Saga ===
1. The Plantagenet Prelude (1976)
2. The Revolt of the Eaglets (1977)
3. The Heart of the Lion (1977)
4. The Prince of Darkness (1978)
5. The Battle of the Queens (1978)
6. The Queen from Provence (1979)
7. Edward Longshanks (1979) (republished as The Hammer of the Scots in 2008)
8. The Follies of the King (1980)
9. The Vow on the Heron (1980)
10. Passage to Pontefract (1981)
11. The Star of Lancaster (1981)
12. Epitaph for Three Women (1981)
13. Red Rose of Anjou (1982)
14. The Sun in Splendour (1982)

=== The Queens of England Series ===
1. Myself My Enemy (1983) (a.k.a. Loyal in Love)
2. Queen of This Realm (1984)
3. Victoria Victorious (1985)
4. The Lady in the Tower (1986)
5. The Courts of Love (1987)
6. In the Shadow of the Crown (1988)
7. The Queen's Secret (1989)
8. The Reluctant Queen (1990)
9. The Pleasures of Love (1991) (a.k.a. The Merry Monarch's Wife)
10. William's Wife (1992) (a.k.a. The Queen's Devotion)
11. Rose Without a Thorn (1993)

=== Children's novels ===
- Meg Roper, daughter of Sir Thomas More (1961)
- The Young Elizabeth (1961)
- The Young Mary Queen of Scots (1962)

=== The Spanish Inquisition Series (non-fiction) ===
- The Rise of the Spanish Inquisition (1959)
- The Growth of the Spanish Inquisition (1960)
- The End of the Spanish Inquisition (1961)

=== Historical non-fiction ===
- A Triptych of Poisoners (1958)
- Mary Queen of Scots: The Fair Devil of Scotland (1975)

=== Reception and legacy ===
==== 20th century ====
Jean Plaidy historical novels were welcomed by readers who found them to be an easy way to gain insight into the panorama of European history.

It was common for school girls in England to read these in history lessons, whilst hiding them behind their proper text books.

In the last decade of the 20th century, historical fiction went out of fashion. Jean Plaidy titles went out of print.

==== 21st century ====
In October 2001, Rachel Kahan, associate editor at Crown Publishing Group, and Jean Plaidy fan since childhood, discovered that Jean Plaidy books had gone out of print in the United States.

"I felt awful – like when you learn that an old friend who you haven't seen for many years has suddenly died. But in this case, I was not just a fan mourning the loss of all those great novels, I was actually in a position to do something about it."
—Rachel Kahan, on discovering in 2003 that Jean Plaidy books had gone out of print in the United States.

Kahan bought the reprint rights to ten Jean Plaidy novels. In April 2003, Crown chose to publish two books under the Three Rivers Press imprint, both featuring Henry VIII. The Lady in the Tower and The Rose Without a Thorn tell the story of two of his six wives, Anne Boleyn and Catherine Howard, both of whom were beheaded. The books were published in paperback with new titles, modern covers and a readers' guide at the back. The first printing of 30,000 copies of each book sold out in 3 months. Based on this success Crown's United Kingdom unit, Arrow Books, bought the entire Jean Plaidy backlist.

=== Reprints ===
==== Three Rivers Press editions ====
In the Spring of 2003 Three Rivers Press, an imprint of U.S. publisher Crown Publishing Group, started republishing Jean Plaidy's stories. Three Rivers Press published some of the books with new titles which are listed here:

- Mary, Queen of Scotland: The triumphant year (23 November 2004, ISBN 0-609-81023-5) previously published as Royal Road to Fotheringay (1955) by Eleanor Burford.
- The Loves of Charles II (25 October 2005, ISBN 1-4000-8248-X) is an omnibus that collects The Wandering Prince (1956), A Health Unto His Majesty (1956), and Here Lies Our Sovereign Lord (1957).
- Loyal in Love (23 October 2007, ISBN 0-307-34616-1) previously published as Myself My Enemy (1983).
- The Merry Monarch's Wife (22 January 2008, ISBN 0-307-34617-X) previously published as The Pleasures of Love (1991).
- The Queen's Devotion (26 August 2008, ISBN 0-307-34618-8) previously published as William's Wife (1990).
- To Hold the Crown (7 October 2008, ISBN 0-307-34619-6) previously published as Uneasy Lies the Head (1982).
- The King's Confidante (7 April 2009, ISBN 0-307-34620-X) previously published as Saint Thomas' Eve (1954).
- For a Queen's Love (2 March 2010, ISBN 0-307-34622-6) previously published as The Spanish Bridegroom (1954).
- A Favorite of the Queen (2 March 2010, ISBN 0-307-34623-4) previously published as Gay Lord Robert (1955).

== Elbur Ford ==
- Poison in Pimlico, 1950
- The Flesh and the Devil, 1950
- Bed Disturbed, 1951
- Evil in the House, 1953
- Such Bitter Business, 1953

== Kathleen Kellow ==
Some of these novels were re-published under the Jean Plaidy name.

- Danse Macabre, 1952
- Rooms at Mrs. Oliver's, 1953
- Lilith, 1954
- It Began in Vauxhall Gardens, 1955
- Call of the Blood, 1956
- Rochester, the Mad Earl, 1957
- Milady Charlotte, 1959
- The World's a Stage, 1960

== Ellalice Tate ==
All these novels were later re-published under the Jean Plaidy name.

- Defenders of the Faith, 1956
- The Scarlet Cloak, 1957
- The Queen of Diamonds, 1958
- Madame du Barry, 1959
- This Was a Man, 1961 (re-published as The King's Adventurer by Jean Plaidy)

== Anna Percival ==
- The Brides of Lanlory, 1960

== Victoria Holt ==
=== Single novels ===
1. Mistress of Mellyn (1960)
2. Kirkland Revels (1962)
3. Bride of Pendorric (1963)
4. The Legend of the Seventh Virgin (1965)
5. Menfreya in the Morning (1966)
6. The King of the Castle (1967)
7. The Queen's Confession: The Story of Marie-Antoinette (1968)
8. The Shivering Sands (1969)
9. The Secret Woman (1970)
10. Shadow of the Lynx (1971)
11. On the Night of the Seventh Moon (1972)
12. The Curse of the Kings (1973)
13. The House of a Thousand Lanterns (1974)
14. Lord of the Far Island (1975)
15. The Pride of the Peacock (1976)
16. Devil on Horseback (1977)
17. My Enemy, the Queen (1978)
18. Spring of the Tiger (1979)
19. Mask of the Enchantress (1980)
20. Judas Kiss (1981)
21. The Demon Lover (1982)
22. The Time of the Hunter's Moon (1983)
23. The Landower Legacy (1984)
24. The Road to Paradise Island (1985)
25. Secret for a Nightingale (1986)
26. Silk Vendetta (1987)
27. The India Fan (1988)
28. The Captive (1989)
29. Snare of Serpents (1990)
30. Daughter of Deceit (1991)
31. Seven for a Secret (1992)
32. The Black Opal (1993)

=== Anthologies in collaboration ===
- "The Bride of Pendorric" in Three Great Romantic Stories (1972) (with Hebe Elsna and Lucy Walker)

=== Reception and legacy ===
==== 20th century ====
Victoria Holt books proved popular with the reading public and many of them made it to bestseller lists. Hibbert won loyalty from large numbers of women readers who passed along their copies to the next generation of women in their family. Hibbert described her heroines as "women of integrity and strong character" who were "struggling for liberation, fighting for their own survival."

"A Victoria Holt book is the sort of story to bring despair to literary critics, and rage to supporters of Women's Lib though it would give a great deal of pleasurable entertainment to vast numbers of ordinary women all over the world."
– a critic

Her 1960 novel Mistress of Mellyn single-handedly revived the Gothic romance genre. Many women started writing their own gothic romances. Even male authors like Tom E. Huff and Julian Fellowes succumbed to the trend and wrote romances under female pseudonyms.

Victoria Holt novels became best-sellers. In 1970, when gothic mania was at its peak, The Secret Woman became one of the top 10 best-selling books in the United States. By 1975, a Victoria Holt paperback began with a first printing of 800,000 copies.

By the early 1970s gothic novels outsold all other genres in paperback fiction, including mysteries, science fiction and Westerns. This coincided with consolidation within the publishing industry where paperbacks and hardcover publishers were brought together under the same corporate parent for the first time. More sophisticated marketing efforts led to placement in grocery and drugstore checkout aisles, where they found their target audience: educated, middle-class women with a reading habit.

Hibbert's romance novels were clean; at the most the main characters exchanged smouldering looks of longing. However, by 1969 the sexual revolution had made explicit description more acceptable. In April 1972, the romance novel The Flame and the Flower took advantage of this change in trend and revolutionized the historical romance genre by detailing physical intimacy between the protagonists. Another such novel, Sweet Savage Love, that followed in 1974 cemented the trend. A new genre was thus born, dubbed the 'sweet savage romance' or the 'bodice ripper' because of the heaving, partly exposed bosom often pictured on the cover.

Interest in Hibbert's clean romances declined. In 1976, a critic complained that Victoria Holt's heroines "must be a little bit dumb or they won't get themselves into such improbable messes in the first place." The next Victoria Holt novel, The Devil on Horseback (1977), was described as "from another era, sort of out of step with today's style." Critics judged the books as falling "short of her previous standards."

"Today's novels are 'bodice rippers' and about as pure as driven slush."
– a book critic in 1982

"In these books, innocent young virgins are carried off unwillingly by sensual, often primitive older men to picturesque lairs: by pirates to their galleons, Arabs to their harems, Indians to their tepees, knights to their castles. Early in the plot, the woman is ravished against her will and there is sex throughout the story."
– a book critic describing the 'bodice-ripper' type of romance novel in 1985

By the early 1980s, Gothic romances were no longer as popular as a decade earlier. Readers demanded more sex and adventure in their romance novels. Publishers created paperback imprints like Silhouette and Candlelight Ecstasy simply to satisfy the enormous demand for "bodice rippers" and "hot historicals".

Bowing to the changing times, Hibbert wrote The Demon Lover, a 1982 Victoria Holt novel, in a style that borrowed several elements from the plot of Sweet Savage Love: forced seduction of a naive girl by a powerful man ending in marriage, set against a background of turmoil in war time. Critics congratulated the move: "Her latest, 'The Demon Lover', is a straight romance with sexual passion, which is currently 'in'. It has no suspense: the thrilling twists and turns of plot that marked her Gothic novels are no more."

Victoria Holt's heroines left the decorous drawing rooms of Victorian England to find adventure in far more exotic locations: inside an Egyptian pyramid (The Curse of the Kings, 1973); among Chinese antiques in Hong Kong (The House of a Thousand Lanterns, 1974); down the opal mines of Australia (The Pride of the Peacock, 1976); on a tea plantation in Ceylon (The Spring of the Tiger, 1979); among lush, tropical islands off the coast of Australia (The Road to Paradise Island, 1985); in Crimea with Florence Nightingale (Secret for a Nightingale, 1986); in mutiny-filled British India (The India Fan, 1988); in a Turkish nobleman's harem in Constantinople (The Captive, 1989); in the British colonies of South Africa (Snare of Serpents, 1990); and on a shipwreck in the South Sea Islands (The Black Opal, 1993).

In 1993, Hibbert died. In the closing years of the 20th century, Victoria Holt titles were made available in large print, audiobook and Braille formats. Translations in several European languages, Russian, Hebrew, Persian, Chinese, Korean, Thai, Vietnamese and Japanese also appeared.

"Never regret. If it's good, it's wonderful. If it's bad, it's experience."
—Eleanor Hibbert writing as Victoria Holt in The Black Opal, 1993.

==== 21st century ====
In 2006, London publisher Harper reprinted four of Victoria Holt's most popular titles with new covers: Mistress of Mellyn (1961), The Shivering Sands (1969), The Shadow of the Lynx (1971) and The Time of the Hunter's Moon (1983). Foreign language translations in European languages, Japanese, Sinhalese and Thai were also published that year.

== Philippa Carr ==
=== Daughters of England Series ===
1. The Miracle at St. Bruno's (1972)
2. The Lion Triumphant (1974)
3. The Witch from the Sea (1975)
4. Saraband for Two Sisters (1976)
5. Lament for a Lost Lover (1977)
6. The Love Child (1978)
7. The Song of the Siren (1980)
8. The Drop of the Dice (1981), later renamed "Will You Love Me in September"
9. The Adulteress (1982)
10. Knave of Hearts (1983), originally titled Zipporah's Daughter
11. Voices in A Haunted Room (1984)
12. The Return of the Gypsy (1985)
13. Midsummer's Eve (1986)
14. The Pool of St. Branok (1987)
15. The Changeling (1989)
16. The Black Swan (1990)
17. A Time for Silence (1991)
18. The Gossamer Cord (1992)
19. We'll Meet Again (1993)

=== Single novels ===
1. Daughters of England (1995)
