= The Secret Woman (novel) =

1970 novel by Eleanor Hibbert

- First edition (UK, publ. Collins)
- Author: Eleanor Hibbert
- Language: English
- Publication date: 1970

The Secret Woman is a Gothic romance and suspense novel written by English author Eleanor Hibbert under the pseudonym Victoria Holt. It was originally published in 1970 and is considered to be a bestseller. Set in 1887, it chronicles Anna Brett's scandalous romance with the married ship captain Redvers Stretton. As they sail across the South Seas, tensions build among Anna, Redvers, and everyone else on-board The Serene Lady, and a mystery involving murder, the destruction of ship called The Secret Woman, and a missing fortune of diamonds begins to unravel.

== Plot summary ==
Anna Brett was born in India, due to her father being in the Indian Army, and when she was about eight years old her parents moved her to live in Langmouth, England with her Aunt Charlotte into what is referred to as the Queen's House. While in Langmouth, Anna was educated and began to learn the ways of Aunt Charlotte's antique business as she grew up.

On one autumn night, a sailor named Redvers Stretton comes to see Anna and their romantic interest in each other starts to grow. As Aunt Charlotte grows older and weaker, she hires a nurse, Chantel Loman, to look after her. Chantel seems to brighten up the normally dreary Queen's House and quickly becomes close friends with Anna. Then one morning, Chantel finds Charlotte dead from an opium tablet overdose. Because she would have benefited from Charlotte's death, people suspect Anna of killing her aunt, but Chantel successfully defends her and the death is declared a suicide. Chantel takes up a position at the nearby Castle Crediton, caring for Monique Stretton, the wife of Redvers that Anna had not previously known about. Anna discovers she inherited serious debts from Aunt Charlotte and decides to sell her antique furniture and rent out the Queen's House. During her time at the castle Chantel and Rex Crediton, Redvers’ half-brother, begin spending a lot of time together. She finds out that Rex and Monique are going to sail on Redvers’ ship The Serene Lady to Australia and Monique's home island of Coralle. Chantel helps get Anna hired as Red's son Edward's governess while they are away.

During the voyage, Edward gets drugged and Anna suspects someone onboard had been planning on throwing him overboard, but most of the passengers assume it was just a prank. Once the ship arrives on the island of Coralle, Red declares his love to Anna and gives her a letter asking for her to wait to be with him just before he departs.

There is an increasing sense of tension and doom during Anna and Chantel's two-month stay on the island; Monique grows more and more distraught and angry over the thought that Red doesn’t love her, and Anna finds out that Chantel had married Rex before they set sail. Upon The Serene Lady’s return, Chantel gives Anna a long letter explaining that she had been plotting to take over Castle Crediton and that she had in fact been responsible for Aunt Charlotte's death. In order for Chantel and Rex to inherit the castle and the family riches, both Red and Edward would have to be dead, so Chantel had drugged Edward on the ship in an attempt to kill him, but the plan failed. Then, on Coralle, Chantel had poisoned some coffee Monique was going to give Red in order to frame his wife for his murder, but Chantel accidentally drinks the coffee herself and dies.

Anna returns to England and continues to be Edward's governess until he begins attending school. She then returns to the Queen's House and one of her maids informs her that Monique died on the island of Coralle. Red returns to England so that he and Anna can finally begin their life together.

== Publication ==
The first edition of The Secret Woman was published in the UK by Collins and in the US by Doubleday & Company, Inc. in New York. Since its initial release several other versions of it have been made; the most recent publication was done by Sourcebooks Casablanca of Sourcebooks, Inc. in Naperville, Illinois in 2014.

== Success ==
The Secret Woman is considered a bestseller of 1970, along with Erich Segal’s Love Story and John Fowles’ The French Lieutenant’s Woman. The book's success was likely also bolstered by the success of Hibbert's previous novels such as Mistress of Mellyn and The Shivering Sands. The positive reception of these works eventually gave Hibbert the title of “Queen of Romantic Suspense” and driving the sales of Victoria Holt novels to over 56 million copies worldwide.
