= Kirkland Revels =

First edition (publ. Collins)

Kirkland Revels is a 1962 Gothic novel by Victoria Holt. Set in a 16th-century former abbey in Yorkshire, this melodrama deals with the life of a young unexpected bride.

== See also ==
- Eleanor Hibbert
- Gothic fiction
