= Queen Jezebel =

1953 novel by Eleanor Alice Burford

- First edition
- Author: Jean Plaidy
- Language: English
- Publisher: Robert Hale
- Publication date: 1953

Queen Jezebel is a 1953 historical novel by Jean Plaidy first published by Robert Hale in the UK.

It portrays the last years of Queen Catherine de' Medici, including the St. Bartholomew's Day massacre; the title alludes to the infamous biblical queen Jezebel, for being lewd and cruel.
