= Plaidy, Cornwall =

Coordinates: 50.360°N 4.441°W

Plaidy
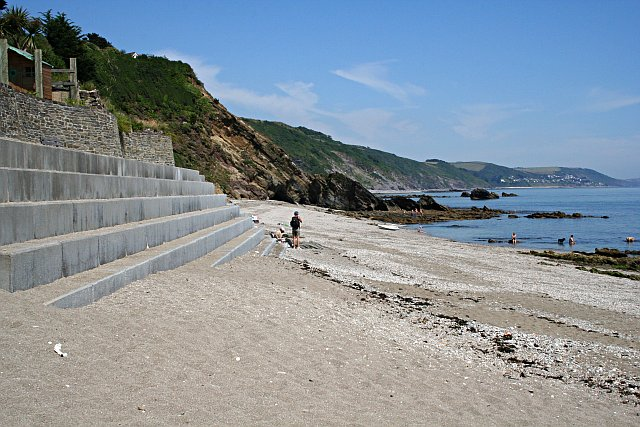
- Plaidy Beach

- Location within Cornwall
- OS grid reference: SX265540
- Unitary authority: Cornwall
- Ceremonial county: Cornwall
- Region: South West
- Country: England
- Sovereign state: United Kingdom

Plaidy is an eastern suburb of Looe, Cornwall, England, UK. Plaidy Beach is a sandy beach and Millendreath Beach is at its eastern end. The writer Eleanor Hibbert lived near Plaidy Beach during World War II and used it as the basis for one of her pen names, Jean Plaidy.
