= Anne Easter Smith =

American novelist

- Born: Anne Easter
- Occupation: Writer
- Known for: Writing novels set in the Wars of the Roses
- Notable work: A Rose for the Crown; Daughter of York; The King's Grace; Queen by Right; Royal Mistress; This Son of York
- Relatives: Nick Easter (nephew)

Anne Easter Smith is a British-American historical novelist known for her series of books set in The Wars of the Roses.

== Early life and education ==
Easter Smith grew up in England, Germany and Egypt. She was educated at British School Suez and boarding school in England. She graduated from St. James Secretarial School in London in 1962. She speaks fluent French.

== Career ==
Easter Smith worked as an executive secretary in London, Paris, New York, and Sacramento, CA; an attaché spouse at the US Embassy in Paris; an Auction Coordinator at a PBS station; and as a newspaper reporter/editor in Plattsburgh, N.Y. She has also been a folk singer, and a community theater actor and director.

Her lifelong fascination with King Richard III led her to write six books set during the Wars of the Roses, featuring Richard and various members of his York family.

Easter Smith's first novel, A Rose for the Crown, has as its central theme the love story between Richard, while he was Duke of Gloucester and during the reign of his brother Edward IV, and the woman who gave birth to Richard's pre-marriage illegitimate children.

In her second novel, Easter Smith focuses on Margaret of York, Richard and Edward's sister, who, like all royals of the time, anticipates a marriage negotiated for political advantage. Margaret is wedded to Charles the Bold, ruler of the Duchy of Burgundy, the wealthiest in Europe. Daughter of York tells the story of Margaret's early life in England, her lavish wedding to Charles, and both her personal and public life in Burgundy's leading cities, which at the time included Bruges, Binche, and Mechelen, among others.

Easter Smith's third novel, The King's Grace, explores the identity of Perkin Warbeck, a pretender to the throne, through the eyes of Grace Plantagenet, an illegitimate daughter of King Edward IV. Her fourth novel, Queen by Right, reveals the long and colorful life of Cecily Neville, mother of Edward IV and Richard III.

Royal Mistress, the author's fifth novel, features the life of Jane Shore, the favorite and final mistress of Edward IV.

Easter Smith's sixth novel, This Son of York, is the story of Richard III.

== Personal life ==
After 20 years in Massachusetts, Easter Smith now lives in Florida with her husband, Scott Smith.

== Bibliography ==
- A Rose for the Crown, Simon & Schuster, 2006.
- Daughter of York, Simon & Schuster, 2008.
- The King's Grace, Simon & Schuster, 2009.
- Queen by Right, Simon & Schuster, 2011.
- Royal Mistress, Simon & Schuster, 2013.
- This Son of York, Bellastoria Press, 2019.

== Sources ==
- https://web.archive.org/web/20070502064956/http://www.historicalnovelsociety.org/ec-feb-2006.htm#arose
