= Mistress of Mellyn =

Book by Eleanor Hibbert

- First edition (US)
- Author: Victoria Holt
- Language: English
- Genre: Romantic suspense, Gothic novel
- Publisher: London: Collins; New York: Doubleday
- Publication date: 1960
- Publication place: United Kingdom
- Media type: Print
- Pages: 334
- ISBN: 0449239241
- OCLC: 24948857
- Dewey Decimal: 823/.914
- LC Class: PR6015 .I3M57 1960
- Followed by: Kirkland Revels (1962)

Mistress of Mellyn was the first Gothic romance novel written by Eleanor Hibbert under the pen name Victoria Holt.

== Plot ==
Impoverished gentlewoman, parsons daughter Martha 'Marty' Leigh, is hired as a governess after a succession of four unsuccessful coming out seasons. She is hired by Connan TreMellyn, a widower, for his 8-years-old daughter, Alvean TreMellyn.

Martha travels by train to Cornwall, where she arrives at Mount Mellyn, the family home of the TreMellyns. The house is nearby to Mount Widden, which houses neighbours Celestine and Peter Nansellock.

Martha learns of Connan TreMellyn's wife, Alice, who supposedly died in a tragic accident whilst trying to run off with Geoffry Nansellock, a man known for his serial affairs, and who died in the same accident.

Upon arrival, she finds Alvean to be a difficult but intelligent and studious child, but attributes this to her recently deceased mother. It is also revealed to her that Alvean has been through three other governesses, the most recent, Miss Jansen, being fired for theft. She also meets Gillyflower whilst working at Mount Mellyn, a timid girl, who had an accident in her early youth, whom everyone treats as dimwitted. Gilly is the illegitimate daughter of Geoffry Nansellock and Jennifer Polgrey, a timid servant girl and daughter of the housekeeper Mrs Polgrey and his husband, the gardener Mr Polgrey, who committed suicide shortly after giving birth. Martha takes a liking to Gilly and begins teaching her as well as Alvean, eventually forming a close bond. Gillyflower's disability is viewed superstitiously as a divine punishment for the sins of her parents—a housemaid and a philandering nobleman who bore her out of wedlock. Martha, however, is quick to realize that Gilly’s speech disability is not divine retribution but rather the result of a head injury and that the others have been underestimating Gilly’s mental capacity.

Peter Nansellock makes advances on Martha but she does not reciprocate them. She also becomes friends with Celestine Nansellock, who acts as a second mother to Alvean, doting on her needs and showering her with affection, although Connan TreMellyn a cold and absent father.

After a ball, Connan kisses Martha. She assumes him to be taking advantage of his position of power and threatens to leave the house. To remedy this, he apologises and proposes they forget about the happening altogether. Martha then confronts Connan about his lack-lustre parenting, telling him that he should spend more time with his daughter as she so desperately admires him. Connan takes her advice. She lakter finds out that Alvean is the illegitimate child of Geoffry Nansellock and his deceased wife Alice TreMellyn, explaining why he was so distant.

Martha attempts to keep control of her developing feelings for Connan TreMellyn, as although he is single, he is thought to marry Lady Linda Treslyn when her husband, Sir Thomas Treslyn, dies. Shortly later, after a Christmas party, Sir Treslyn dies so it is presumed the two will marry.

However, Connan TreMellyn goes to Penzance and writes for Martha and Alvean to follow. When they arrive, he proposes to Martha and they go back to Mount Mellyn to prepare for the wedding. Here, Martha decides to write to Miss Jensen and they meet in Plymouth. Miss Jensen tells Martha that Lady Treslyn framed her for the theft that she was fired for. She also reveals that she and Celestine share an interest in old houses, and asks Martha to tell Celestine about some new, interesting architecture. This is an architectural quirk called “peeps”—hidden little spy holes cut into the walls of certain rooms to look down into important sections of the house such as the ballroom and the old, disused chapel.

Martha returns to Mount Mellyn and tells Celestine she met with Miss Jensen. Together, they go to the house Chapel and look for a priest-hole, a secret room in which a priest would hide from the Queen's men. When they find it, Celestine opens the door and pushes Martha inside, locking her in. Celestine's motive is revealed to be a desire to inherit the house through Alvean. Whilst Martha is in the room, she finds Alice's body.

Gilly, who had witnessed the whole affair, later returns with Connan and rescues Martha.

In the epilogue, Martha and Connan TreMellyn are married with ten children.

== Characters ==
- Martha Leigh: the 24-year-old governess to Alvean TreMellyn
- Connan TreMellyn: widower and landowner in Cornwall
- Alice TreMellyn: Connan TreMellyn's dead wife
- Alvean TreMellyn: Connan TreMellyn's daughter
- Celestine Nansellock: Connan TreMellyn's friend
- Peter Nansellock: Connan TreMellyn's friend, Celestine's brother
- Geoffry Nansellock: Connan TreMellyn's dead friend, Celestine's and Peter's brother
- Miss Jansen: former governess to Alvean TreMellyn
- Lady Linda Treslyn: Connan TreMellyn's lover
- Sir Thomas Treslyn: Linda's husband
- Joe Tapperty: servant
- Mrs. Tapperty: servant, Joe's wife
- Daisy: servant, Joe and Mrs. Tapperty's daughter
- Kitty: servant, Joe and Mrs. Tapperty's daughter
- Mrs. Polgrey: housekeeper at Mount Mellyn
- Tom Polgrey: servant, Mrs. Polgrey's husband
- Jennifer Polgrey: servant, Tom and Mrs. Polgrey's dead daughter
- Gilly/Gillyflower: Jennifer's shy daughter
- Billy Trehay: servant
- Aunt Adelaide: Martha's aunt
- Phillida Leigh: Martha's sister

== Themes ==
=== Gothic ===
Set in 19th century England, Mistress of Mellyn weaves together elements from earlier Gothic novels such as Jane Eyre (1847), The Woman in White (1859), and Rebecca (1938). The setting of Cornwall is typical of a Gothic novel, as seen in Rebecca. The dramatic scenery creates for the perfect backdrop to a novel full of suspense, similar to the Yorkshire Moors in Wuthering Heights (1847). The country setting also allows for a secluded and isolated house, typical of the Gothic romance genre.

As well as the setting, Hibbert's plotline also falls into typical Gothic romance tropes, emboldening her strong ties to the genre. A young, impressionable girl meets a mysterious widower in a mansion filled with the memories of his first wife who has suffered a tragic death. She then fears for her own life as she unravels secrets of the home and family.

=== Romantic suspense ===
The romance between the young governess and her handsome employer is hampered by the mystery surrounding the tragic death of his first wife. Looking to solve the mystery, the young woman starts poking around the gloomy corners of the spooky mansion set on the wild Cornish cliffs.

The roles the characters play and the characteristics they possess are also in-keeping with the Gothic romance genre. Martha, the heroine, is attractive but doesn't know it, with a dead father and a life in danger. She develops feelings for Connan TreMellyn, the Super-Male, who is dark and cruel but turns into someone who is exciting and magnetic. There also exists Peter Nansellock, the Shadow-Male, and Linda Treslyn and Alice TreMellyn, the Other Women, generally promiscuous, dead or both, who all pose as threats to the relationship developing between Connan and Martha.

== Publication ==
=== 1960 edition ===
The novel was published by Doubleday in the United States and Collins in the United Kingdom.

=== Later Editions ===
The novel was serialized in the Ladies' Home Journal, chosen as a Reader's Digest condensed book and issued in a treasury volume that included other Gothic authors such as Daphne du Maurier, Phyllis A. Whitney, Evelyn Anthony, Madeleine Brent and Jessica Nelson North.

Several reprints were issued over the years. It was issued in ebook format by St. Martin's Griffin, New York in 2009 and St. Martin's Press, New York in 2013.

== Location ==
The novel's setting in Cornwall made the resemblance to Rebecca so remarkable that it was speculated Victoria Holt was a pseudonym for Daphne du Maurier. After six Victoria Holt novels were published over eight years, it was revealed that Hibbert was the author.

The location of Cornwall also affects the names of the characters. The TreMellyn's surname is separated into the prefix 'Tre' and the root 'Mellyn'. Mellyn being the name of the house and 'Tre' being a traditional Cornish prefix meaning homestead.

== Reception ==
Most early reviews were positive. A critic found "the dramatic tale compounded of mystery and romance, and full of surprises for even the most wary reader." Another critic said it was "a novel to delight the most romantic reader." Mistress of Mellyn became an instant international bestseller, selling over one million copies in the first six months. The novel is often credited with reviving the Gothic romantic suspense genre. The book earned Hibbert £100,000, which in today's money is just over £2 million.

== Adaptations ==
In 1961, Mildred C. Kuner adapted the novel into a play in three acts. Paramount purchased the film rights to the novel, but never produced a film.

The novel was adapted into the 1965 Taiwanese film The Bride Who Has Returned from Hell.
