= St Peter's, Notting Hill =

Coordinates: 51°30′45.5″N 0°12′10″W

St Peter's Notting Hill
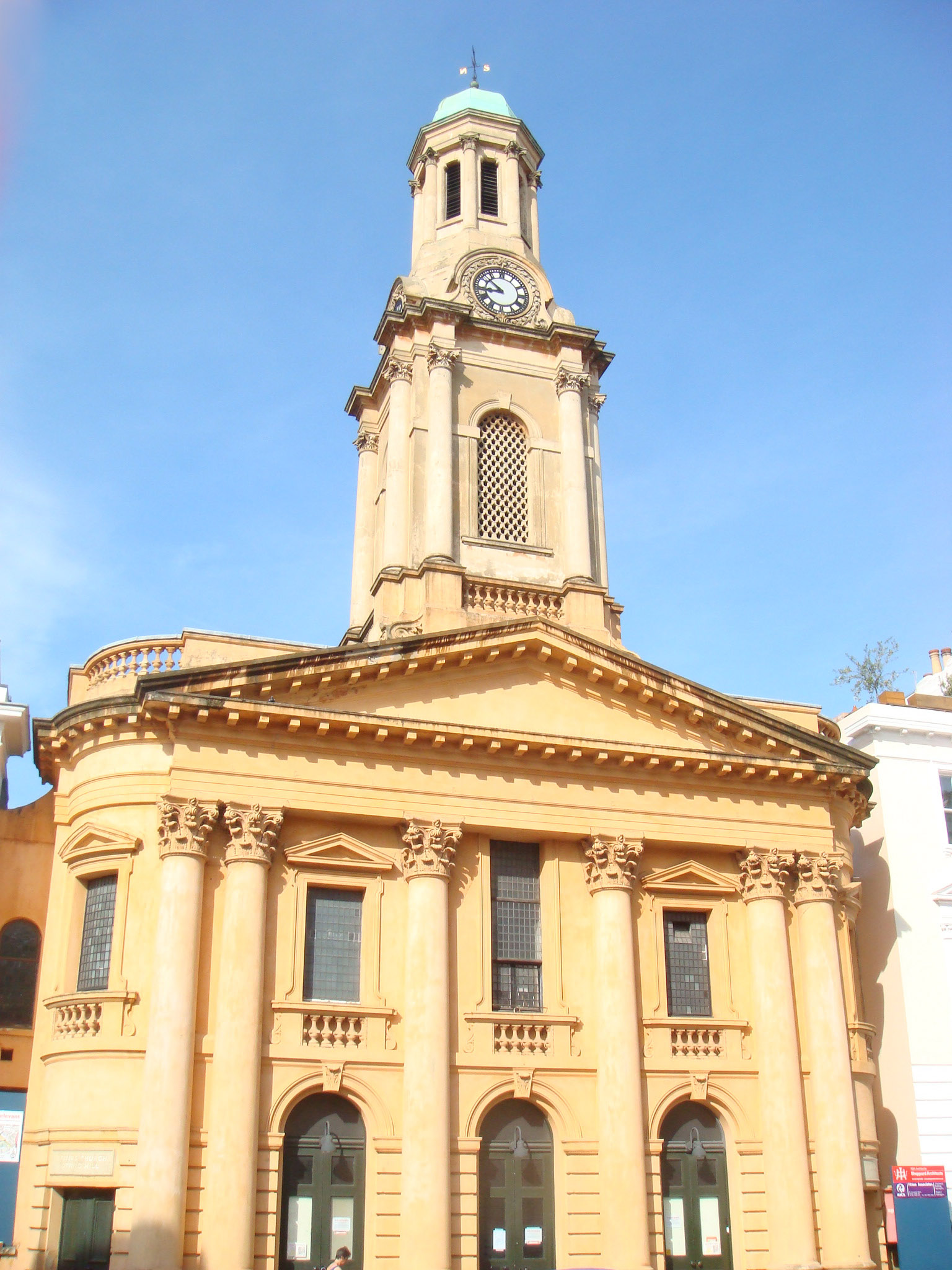
- St Peter's Notting Hill, viewed from Stanley Gardens
- St Peter's Notting Hill
- Location: Kensington Park Road, London
- Country: England
- Denomination: Church of England
- Website: stpetersnottinghill.org.uk

Architecture
- Architect: Thomas Allom
- Style: Classical Revival
- Years built: 1845

Administration
- Diocese: London
- Parish: St Peter's Notting Hill

Clergy
- Vicar: Pat Allerton

St Peter's Notting Hill is a Victorian Anglican church in Kensington Park Road, Notting Hill, London. Designed in the classical style by architect Thomas Allom, work was begun in 1855 and completed in 1857.

== History ==
Until the mid nineteenth century Notting Hill was a largely rural neighbourhood at the edge of the western suburbs of London. Development in the area began during the 1840s on the Ladbroke Estate where St John's Notting Hill was completed in 1845. It soon became clear that another church was needed, and the site for St Peter's was donated by the trader and philanthropist Charles Henry Blake (1794–1872). Blake had made his fortune in India trading in indigo, and went on to make an even greater fortune as landowner, financier, builder and speculator in Notting Hill. In 1845 Blake had made a significant financial contribution to the construction of neighbouring St John's.

St Peter's was designed by Allom as a part of his overall plan for Kensington Park Gardens and the neighbouring streets of Stanley Crescent and Stanley Gardens, which were developed by Blake.

Work on St Peter's was begun in November 1855. The completed church was consecrated on 7 January 1857 by the then Bishop of London, Archibald Campbell Tait. St Peter's was designed to accommodate a congregation of 1,400. It is thought to be the last 19th century Anglican church to be built in London in the classical style.

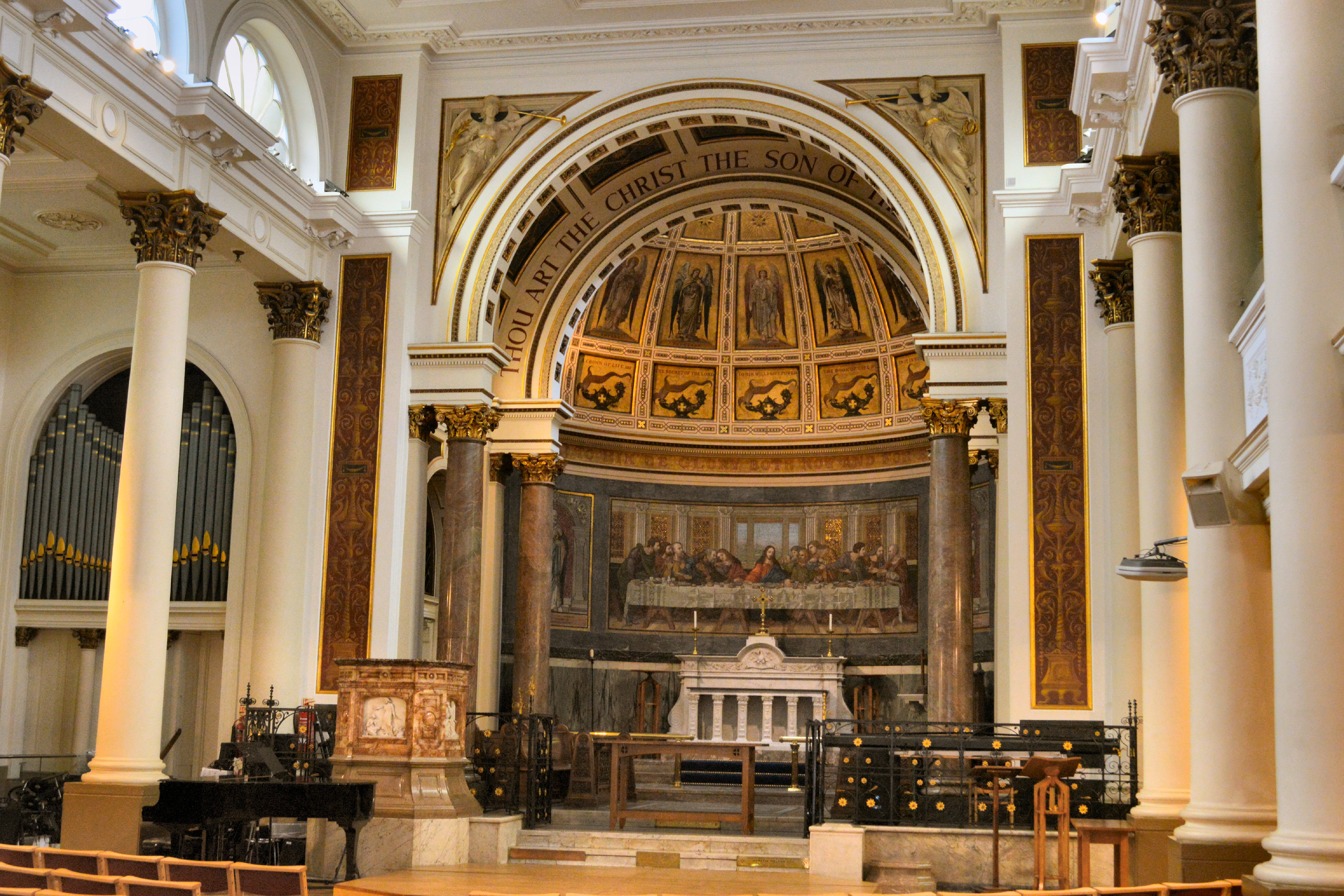
St Peter's Church, interior

St Peter's is a building of notable architectural quality, and is listed Grade II*. The interior of the building is very elaborate, with many of the pillars boasting gilded capitals.

== St Peter's today ==
In 1982 the parishes of St John's and St Peter's were linked by the appointment of a single vicar, and in 1986 the parishes became the united parish of St Peter's and St John's. However, on 1 January 2003 the two parishes again separated, though they continue to form part of a group ministry.

The church is used for Notting Hill lunchtime concerts.
