= Dermot O'Toole =

Irish architect

- Born: 22 November 1910; Maynooth, Ireland
- Died: 22 December 1970 (aged 60)
- Occupation: Architect

Dermot O'Toole (22 November 1910 – 22 December 1970) was an Irish architect.

== Life ==
Christopher Joseph Dermot O'Toole was born on 22 November 1910 in Maynooth, County Kildare. He attended the national school in Maynooth, and later the Christian Brothers' school in Kilcock. In 1926, he became an articled pupil to Dominic O'Connor, in Cork. From October 1927 to July 1928, he attended classes at the Metropolitan School of Art, Dublin, the Crawford Technical Institute and Crawford School of Art.

O'Toole moved to Dublin in 1933, where he took up a positions with Alfred Augustine Murphy, Scott and Good, Rudolf Maximilian Butler and Ralph Henry Byrne. During this time, he had been involved in the early stages of designing Tullamore Hospital, County Offaly. He joined the Office of Public Works (OPW) in 1937 as part of the team of architects designing the new Dublin Airport as a chief assistant architect to Desmond FitzGerald along with Harry Robson, Daithí Hanly, Kevin Barry, and Charles Aliaga-Kelly.

He then worked as an Inspector in the Department of Local Government before setting up a practice with Thomas Paul Kennedy in 1944 or 1945 based at 69 Fitzwilliam Square. O'Toole practised on his own from around 1857, initially from 2 Hatch Street, and then from his home, 36 Coliemore Road, Dalkey from 1964, working on domestic and commercial projects such as The Submarine Bar, Crumlin (1947) a house in Templeogue (1954). He was also active in town planning and landscape consultancy with public authorities, and was a pioneer of the Bord Failte Tidy Towns initiative.

He was elected a member of the Architectural Association of Ireland in 1935, serving as vice-president from 1942 to 1943, and president from 1943 to 1944. As a student he was a elected a member of the Royal Institute of the Architects of Ireland, a full member in 1935, and elected fellow around 1951. He was a member of the Town Planning Institute in 1940. His work was part of the architecture event in the art competition at the 1948 Summer Olympics.

O'Toole died on 22 December 1970. He was married with a family.
