= Alan Hope =

Alan Hope or Allan Hope may refer to:

- Alan Hope (architect), RIAI Triennial Gold Medal recipient
- Allan Hope (1903-1984), Australian rules footballer
- Howling Laud Hope (real name Alan Hope; born 1942), British politician
- Allan Hope (born 1952), better known as Mutabaruka, Jamaican Rastafari dub poet, musician, actor, educator, and talk-show host

== See also ==
- Alan Hopes (born 1944), British bishop
