= Thomond Park =

Sports stadium in Limerick, Ireland

- Páirc Thuamhan
- Fortress Thomond
- Exterior of the Stadium in 2025
- Interactive map of Thomond Park
- Location: Limerick
- Coordinates: 52°40′27″N 8°38′33″W
- Owner: Munster Rugby
- Capacity: 26,006 (15,100 seated) (Note: Thomond Park's official capacity is 25,600 but can be expanded up to 26,276 with temporary seating.)
- Surface: Grass
- Record attendance: 26,267 (Munster vs All Blacks XV)
- Public transit: Limerick railway station Ballynanty Road bus stop

Construction
- Opened: 1934
- Rebuilt: 2008
- Architect: Murray Ó Laoire Architects

Tenants
- Munster Rugby; Shannon RFC; UL Bohemian RFC; Limerick FC (2013–2015)

Thomond Park is a stadium in Limerick in the Irish province of Munster. The stadium is owned by the Munster Rugby and has Shannon RFC and UL Bohemian RFC as tenants. Limerick FC played home games in Thomond Park from 2013 to 2015 in the League of Ireland while the Markets Field was being redeveloped. The capacity of the stadium is 25,600 following its large-scale redevelopment in 2008. This was expanded to 26,500 for the first time when Munster played Northampton Saints in the Heineken Cup on 12 November 2022. This was reduced to 25,100 in October 2025, for safety & comfort reasons.

== History ==
The Munster branch of the Irish Rugby Football Union purchased a site at Hassett's Cross in 1930, after the facilities at Markets Field became outdated. The stadium holds a special place in rugby due to its own unique history and atmosphere. The stadium is famed for its noise during play and the complete silence while home and away players are kicking for goal and other significant moments, such as the All Blacks Haka. Munster also retained an intimidating 12-year unbeaten run at Thomond in the Heineken Cup—running from the competition's start in 1995 until 2007 when Leicester Tigers broke the streak with a 13–6 win. On 31 October 1978 Munster celebrated their historic 12–0 victory over the All Blacks in front 12,000 fans at Thomond Park.

=== Pre redevelopment ===
Thomond Park (named after the medieval kingdom of Thomond) originally consisted of two pitches, the main pitch and a training pitch. The main pitch was bounded on all sides by terracing with a stand above the west terrace. The training pitch was behind the west stand with the Shannon pavilion in the southwest corner of the ground, and the UL Bohemian R.F.C. pavilion within the west stand.

Traditionally, the former terracing and four sides of the pitch had local nicknames, however they have since fallen out of local parlance. The most famous of these was the east terrace, which was known among fans as the "Popular side", this sat opposite the "Stand side", joining the "City End" (South terrace) with the "Ballynanty End" (North terrace). The "Popular side" gained notoriety in local rugby folklore for the colourful comments that can be heard emanating from local wags and alickadoos in the direction of the pitch, occasionally drawing reaction from players and officials, to the amusement of other attendants.

Prior to redevelopment, the official capacity of Thomond Park was 13,000. The highest pre-redevelopment official attendance in Thomond Park was 18,000 people and occurred in 1992 in a local derby in the All-Ireland League between Shannon and Garryowen.

=== Redevelopment ===
In 1998 and 1999, following the introduction of the professional era, the Irish Rugby Football Union (IRFU) spent several million pounds on floodlighting, terracing, toilets, medical facilities and a new pitch for the ground. In January 2006, the Munster Branch of the IRFU made offers to buy some adjacent houses to expand the stadium. In March 2006 the IRFU and Munster Rugby announced that Thomond Park was unanimously selected for the site of the branch's new stadium, and in May 2006 the design for the re-development was unveiled by Murray Ó Laoire Architects. Work started in early 2007, and the project was completed for a re-opening in Autumn 2008.

The principal elements of the project saw the erection of two new stands adjacent to the existing main pitch, with a seating capacity of 15,100 and terrace capacity of 10,530, or 25,630 in all.

It was thought that Thomond Park would be renamed in a sponsorship deal, following its redevelopment. However, it was confirmed in February 2008 that the name Thomond Park would remain the same, with naming rights being sold for the individual stands instead.

=== Atmosphere ===
Thomond Park is well known for its atmosphere. During a rugby match, the home fans can be heard singing songs such as "The Fields of Athenry" and "Stand Up and Fight". These two songs play a vital role in Munster rugby as they are Munster's anthems. Donal Spring, one of the heroes of 1978, credits the spectators for its unique ethos: "What's so special about Thomond Park? The crowd. Simply the crowd. The atmosphere is electric. Of all the places I've played, playing with Munster at Thomond Park is what I’ve enjoyed most."

The home crowd is also famous for its silence when a team's kicker is kicking for goal. This has been known to put the away team's kicker off, although it is done out of respect.

In August 2013 Thomond Park was awarded the title of 'Best Rugby Stadium in the World' following a vote by rugby supporters across the globe.

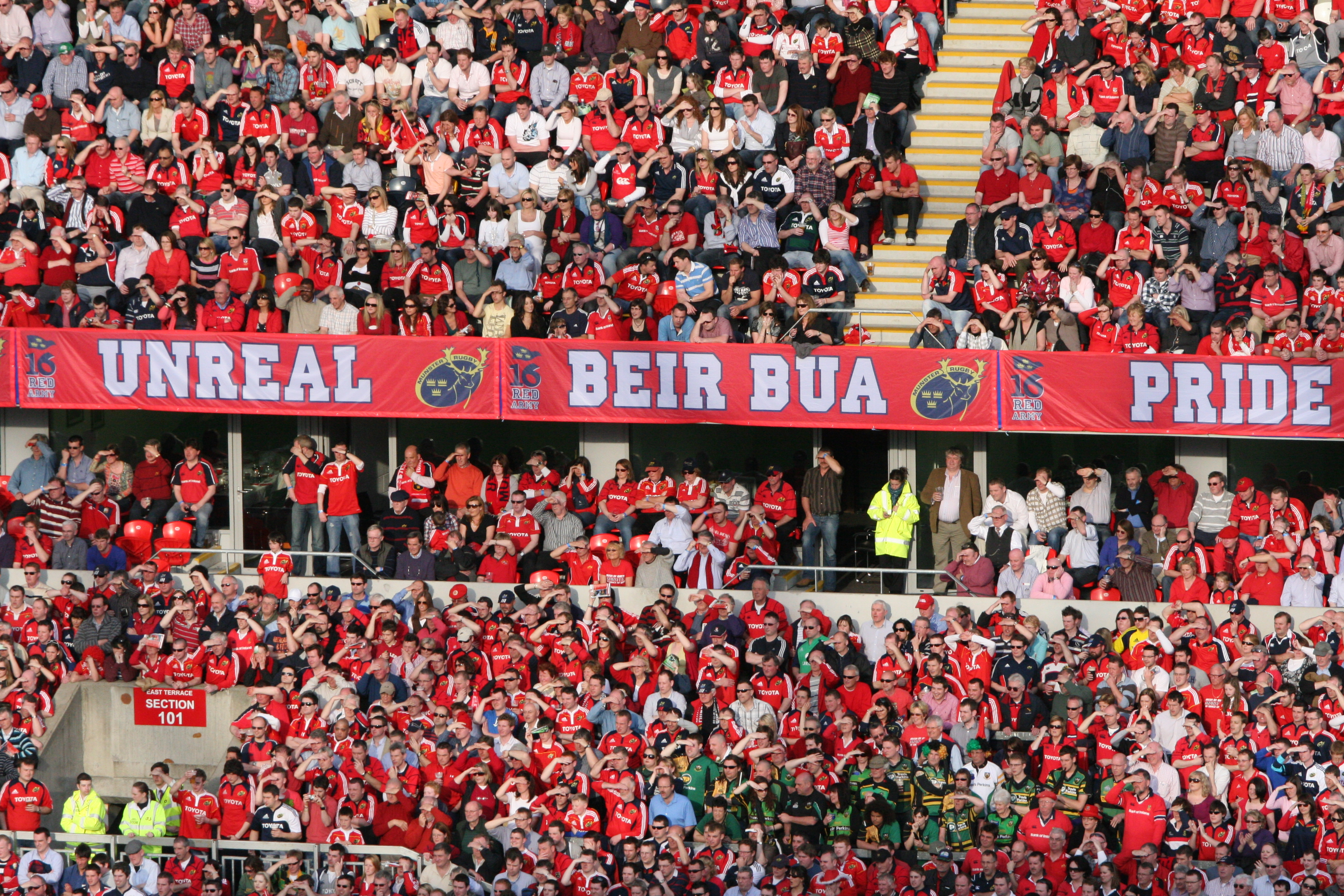
Munster Fans during an April 2010 Heineken cup match versus Northampton

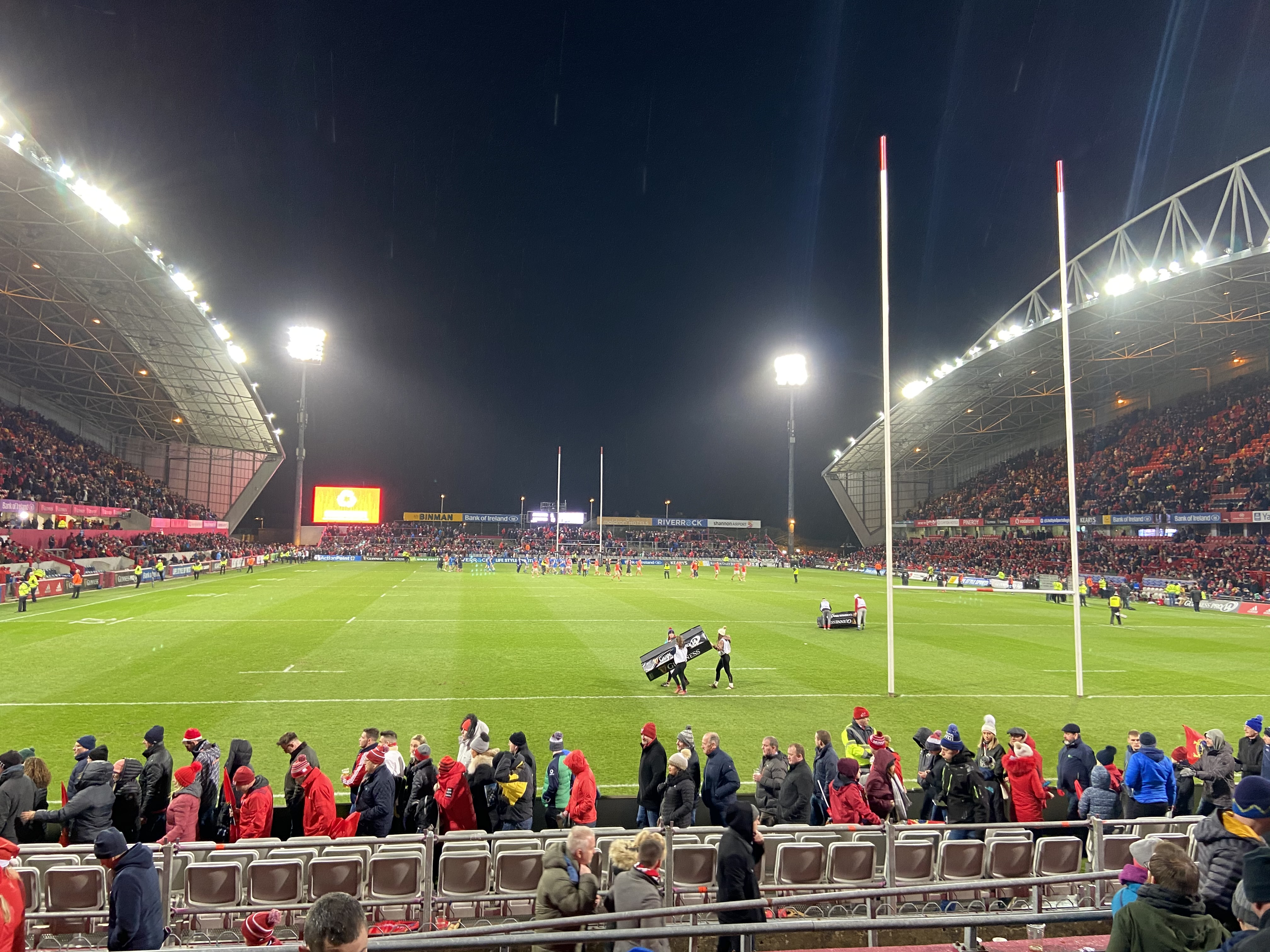
Munster vs Leinster 28 December 2019

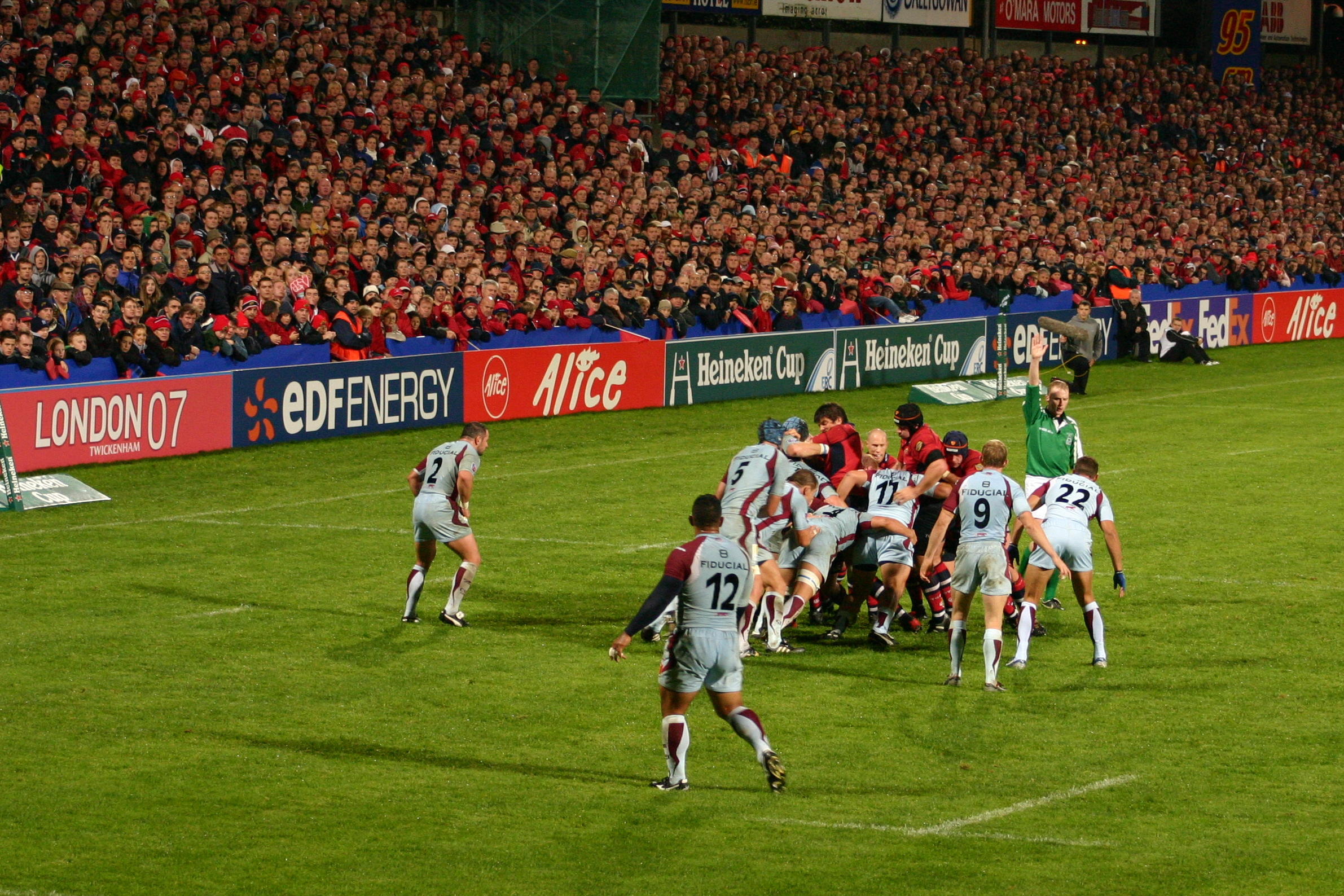
Munster vs Bourgoin October 2006

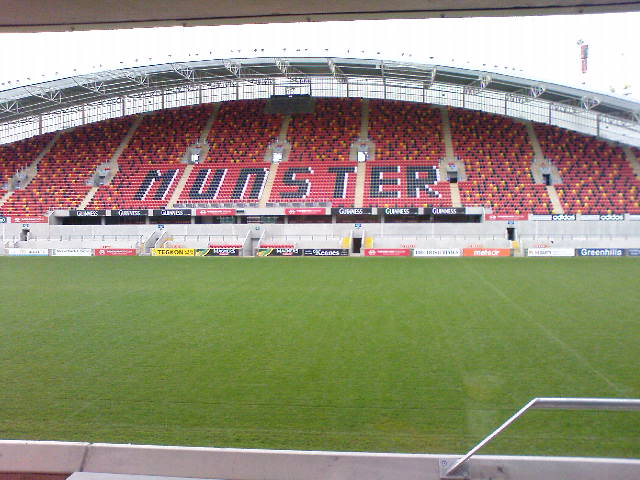
View of east stand in 2008 after redevelopment

== International Fixtures ==
Limerick has hosted 14 Ireland internationals, 13 of which were held at Thomond Park, four of which were full internationals. The results are as follows:

Ireland Senior Test Matches
Date	Home	Away	Final score	Competition	Attendance	Report
19 March 1898	Ireland	Wales*	3 – 11	1898 Home Nations Championship	est. 10–15,000	
7 September 2002	Ireland	Romania	39 – 8	Friendly	8,000	
30 August 2003	Ireland	Italy	61 – 6	Friendly (warm up for 2003 Rugby World Cup)	14,000	
8 November 2008	Ireland	Canada	55 – 0	Friendly	21,500	
*The match was played at the County Cricket Grounds on what is now the Limerick Lawn Tennis Club.

Updated as of 22 April 2021.

Ireland Uncapped International Matches
Date	Home	Away	Final score	Competition	Attendance	Report
10 March 1990	Ireland U25	United States	12 – 10			
8 September 1990	Ireland U25	Spain	36 – 17	1990 Spain rugby union tour		
20 October 1990	Ireland B	Argentina	27 – 12	1990 Argentina rugby union tour of British Isles		
20 March 1998	Ireland A	Wales A	27 – 42		7,000	
15 November 2000	Ireland A	South Africa XV	28 – 11	2000 South Africa tour of Argentina, Britain and Ireland		
16 November 2006	Ireland A	Australia A	17 – 24	2006 Australia rugby union tour of Europe	6,500	
4 June 2010	Ireland	Barbarian F.C.*	23 – 29	Friendly	25,600	
17 November 2012	Ireland XV	Fiji†	53 – 0	Guinness Autumn International Series	17,126	
28 May 2015	Ireland	Barbarian F.C.*	21 – 22	Friendly	16,111	
6 February 2026	Ireland XV	England A	14 – 52	Friendly		
*Neither match against the Barbarians was considered a full international.
†An Ireland XV side played this match. Irish players were not awarded caps.

Updated as of 7 February 2026.

=== 1999 Rugby World Cup Matches ===
14 October 1999
17:00 WEST/GMT+1 (UTC+01)

Australia	55–19	United States
Try: Staniforth (2); Latham; Whitaker; Foley; Burke; Larkham; Strauss; Con: Burke (5); Roff; Pen: Burke	Report	Try: Grobler; Con: Dalzell; Pen: Dalzell (4)

Thomond Park, Limerick
Attendance: 13,000
Referee: André Watson (South Africa)

== Other sporting fixtures ==
Thomond Park held the Irish heats of the 2011 Special Olympics World Summer Games over the course of four days in June 2010.

Football

At Thomond Park, Limerick F.C. played Shamrock Rovers in the League of Ireland Shield, BSC Young Boys in the 1960 European Cup and Torino in the 1971 European Cup Winners' Cup. From 2013 to 2015, Limerick F.C. played Airtricity League home fixtures at Thomond Park. They also have played Manchester City FC twice in friendlies in 1992 and 2012.

The Republic of Ireland national football team played two international friendlies in Thomond during the construction of the Aviva Stadium. The first, on 12 August 2009 against Australia drew a crowd just above 19,000. Australia won 3–0. Ireland played and defeated South Africa 1–0 at Thomond on 8 September 2009 to a crowd of 11,300.

Thomond hosted an International Champions Cup match between Internazionale and Celtic on 13 August 2016 with Internazionale winning 2–0.

Ireland International Football Matches
Date	Home	Score	Opponent	Competition	Attendance
12 August 2009	Republic of Ireland	0–3	Australia	Friendly	19,000
8 September 2009	Republic of Ireland	1–0	South Africa	Friendly	11,300

Rugby League

On 5 November 2011, the stadium hosted its first Rugby league game when Ireland took on France. On 9 November 2013, Thomond Park hosted Ireland's 2013 Rugby League World Cup Group A match with Australia.

International Rugby League Matches
Date	Home	Score	Opponent	Competition	Attendance
5 November 2011	Ireland	16–34	France	Test match	3,100
9 November 2013	Ireland	0–50	Australia	2013 Rugby League World Cup	5,021

=== Concerts ===
- Elton John — 6 June 2009 — Rocket Man: Greatest Hits Live
- Rod Stewart – 4 July 2009
- P!nk (supported by Butch Walker) – 20 June 2010 – Funhouse Summer Carnival Tour
- Bob Dylan (supported by David Gray, Seasick Steve & Alabama 3) – 4 July 2010
- The Cranberries – 9 June 2010 (Special Olympics opening ceremony – their first performance in their home city in over 15 years)
- Bruce Springsteen – 16 July 2013 – Wrecking Ball Tour
- Ed Sheeran – 5 and 6 May 2022 – +–=÷× Tour
- Dermot Kennedy (supported by Cian Ducrot, Nell Mescal and Kingfishr) - 7th, 8th and 9th of July 2023
- Snow Patrol (supported by Kingfishr and Pillow Queens - 12th of July 2024
- Paolo Nutini (supported by CMAT and Brógeal) - 13th of July 2024
- The Wolfe Tones (supported by Brógeal) - 13th of July 2025
- Liam Gallagher (supported by The Mary Wallopers) - 14th of July 2024
- The Script (supported by James Bay and Allie Sherlock) - 12th of July 2025

== Attendances ==
The highest pre-redevelopment official attendance in Thomond Park came in 1992 when a local derby in the All-Ireland League between clubs Shannon RFC and Garryowen FC saw an attendance of 18,000 people. Munster's average league attendance for the 2013–14 Pro12 season was 12,334 Munster's average league attendance for the 2014–15 Pro12 season was 13,179, the third highest in the league.

== See also ==
- Stadia of Ireland
