= Liam McCormick =

Irish architect (1916–1996)

- Born: William Henry Dunleavy McCormick; 24 October 1916
- Died: August 28, 1996 (aged 79)
- Occupation: Architect

William Henry Dunlevy McCormick (24 October 1916, Derry – 28 August 1996) was one of the founders of the modern Irish architectural movement and one of the most important church architects in Ulster. He was responsible for designing twenty-seven ecclesiastical buildings and numerous commercial and state buildings, including the iconic Met Éireann building in Glasnevin, Dublin. McCormick was an accomplished sailor and member of the Irish Cruising Club, for which he served as flag officer.

== Life ==
McCormick was educated at St Columb's College, Derry, but later studied architecture in Liverpool (where he graduated in 1943). On his return to Northern Ireland he began working for the Derry Corporation and later for Ballymena Urban District Council. Whilst living in Derry, McCormick contracted tuberculosis and was sent to convalesce in Greencastle in Inishowen, County Donegal. In 1947, whilst convalescing, together with Frank Corr, McCormick successfully won a competition to design a new church for Ennistymon in County Clare.

== Career ==
In 1948, McCormick and Frank Corr formed an architectural studio called Corr and McCormick. The studio continued to exist until 1968, when McCormick then formed McCormick Tracey Mullarkey. McCormick continued to design churches until his retirement in 1982, after which he completed a number of private commissions, including the house near Greencastle of his close friend and Derry politician John Hume. During the 1970s, McCormick's architectural studio offices were firebombed, leading to the total destruction of his professional records.

== Awards ==
In 1999 McCormick's St Aengus' Church, Burt, County Donegal was voted Ireland's "Building of the 20th century" in a readers' poll organised by the Royal Institute of the Architects of Ireland and the Sunday Tribune, which featured windows from a stained glass artist he commissioned for 11 of his buildings, Helen Moloney. Additionally McCormick was awarded the RIAI Triennial Gold Medal.

== Legacy ==
McCormick was one of the founding members of the North West Architectural Association. He was also a member of the Ulster Architectural Heritage Society (UAHS), the Royal Society of Ulster Architects and the Royal Institute of the Architects of Ireland. He was also a trustee of the Ulster Museum. In 1977, McCormick was awarded an honorary doctorate from Coleraine University. In 1984 he was made a Knight of St Gregory.

== Notable buildings by region ==
=== County Donegal ===
- Milford church (1961)
- Murlog church (1964)
- Desertegney church (1964)
- Burt church (1967)
- Creeslough church (1971)
- Glenties church (1974)
- Donoughmore Presbyterian church (1977)

=== Dublin ===
- Met Éireann Building, Glasnevin (1979)

== Gallery ==
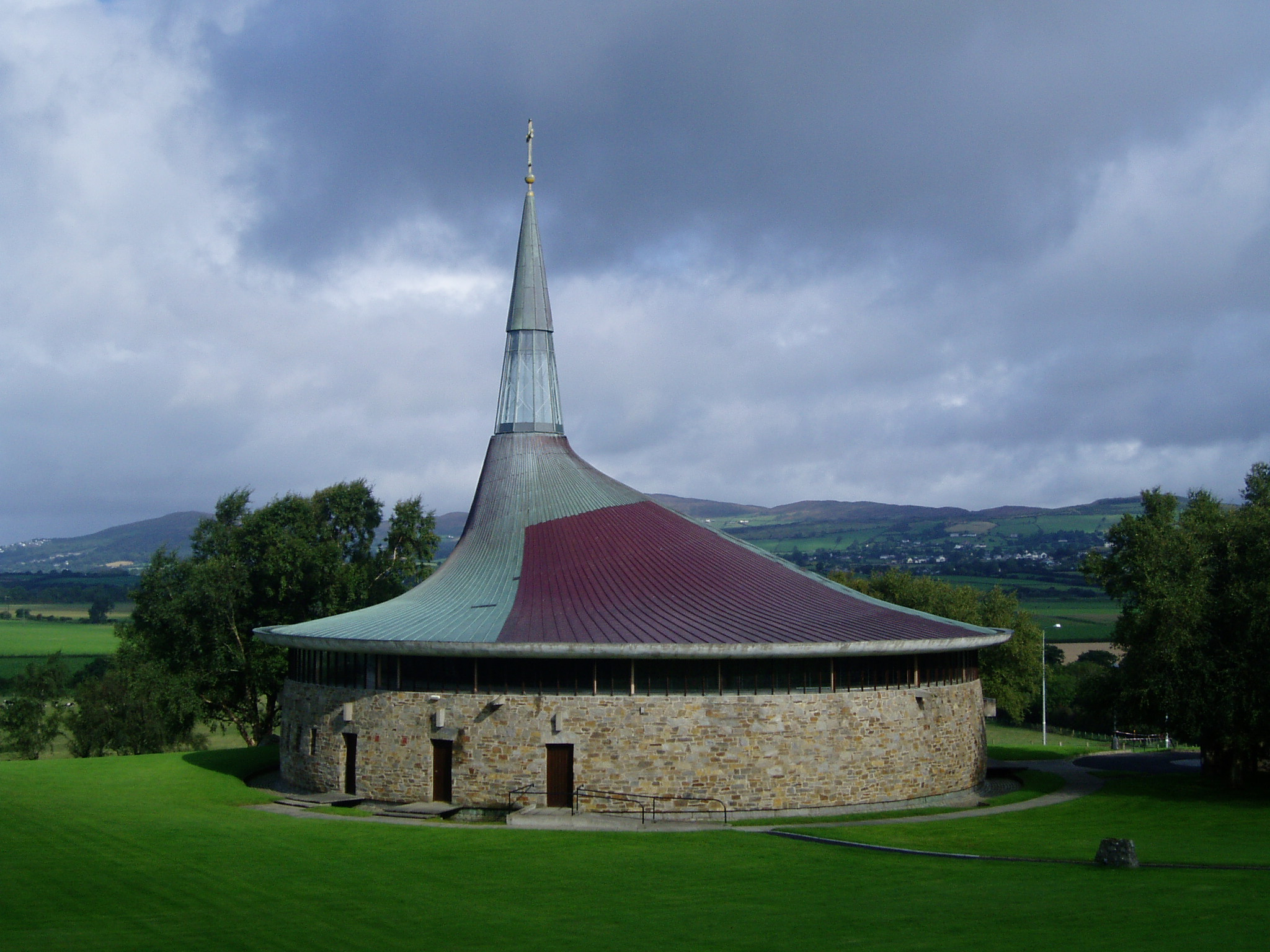
St Aengus' Church, Burt, County Donegal

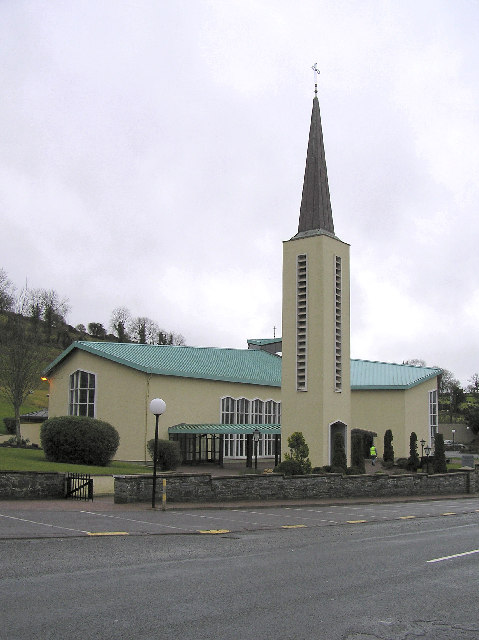
St. Patrick's Church, Murlog, County Donegal

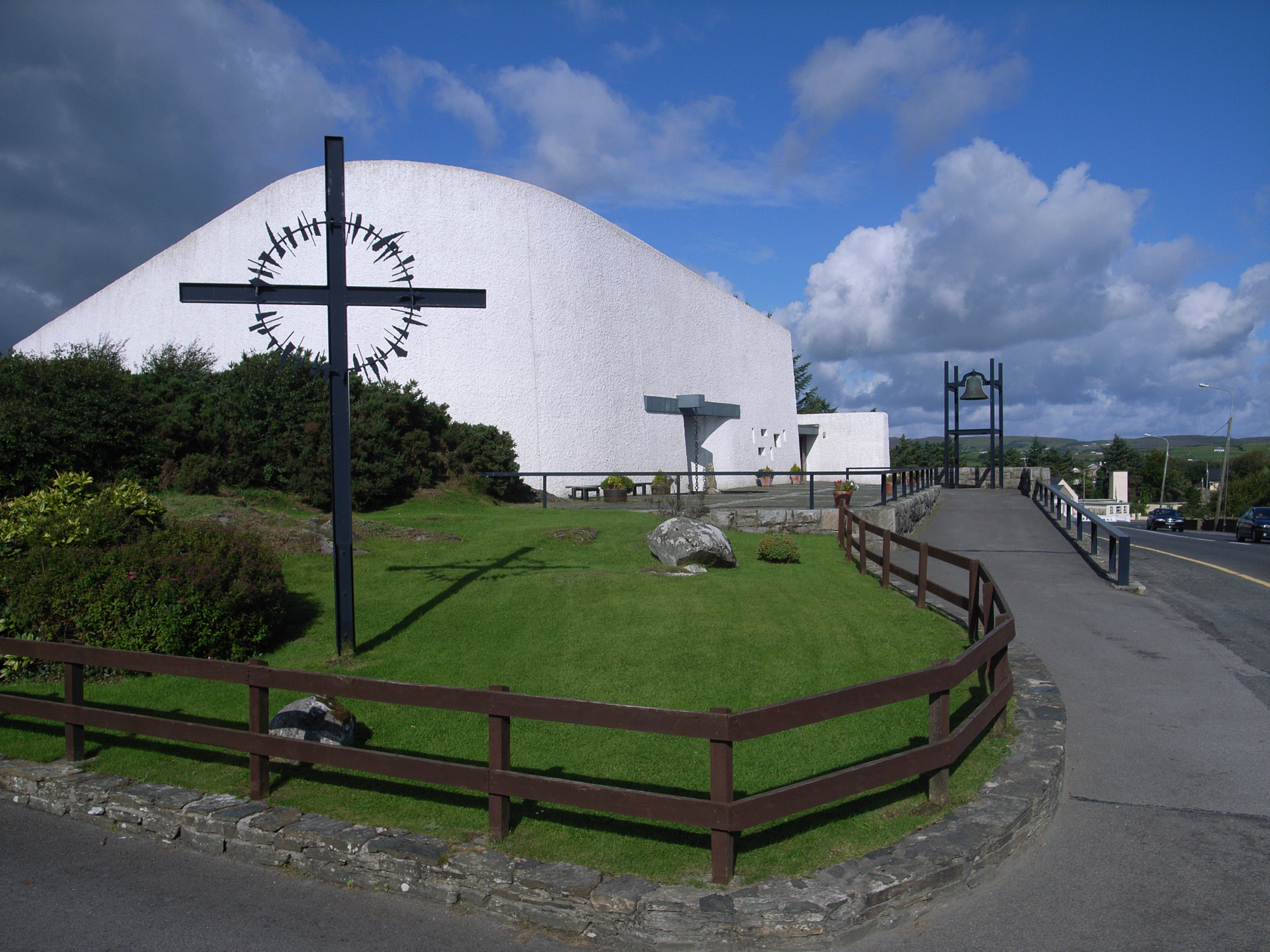
Archangel Saint Michael Church, Cresslough Church, County Donegal

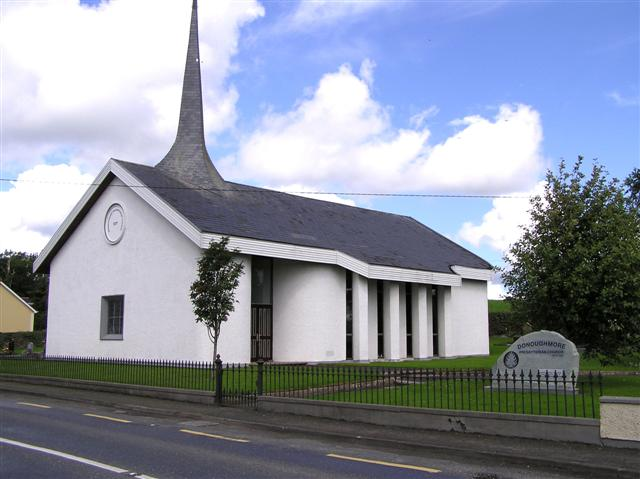
Donoughmore Presbyterian Church

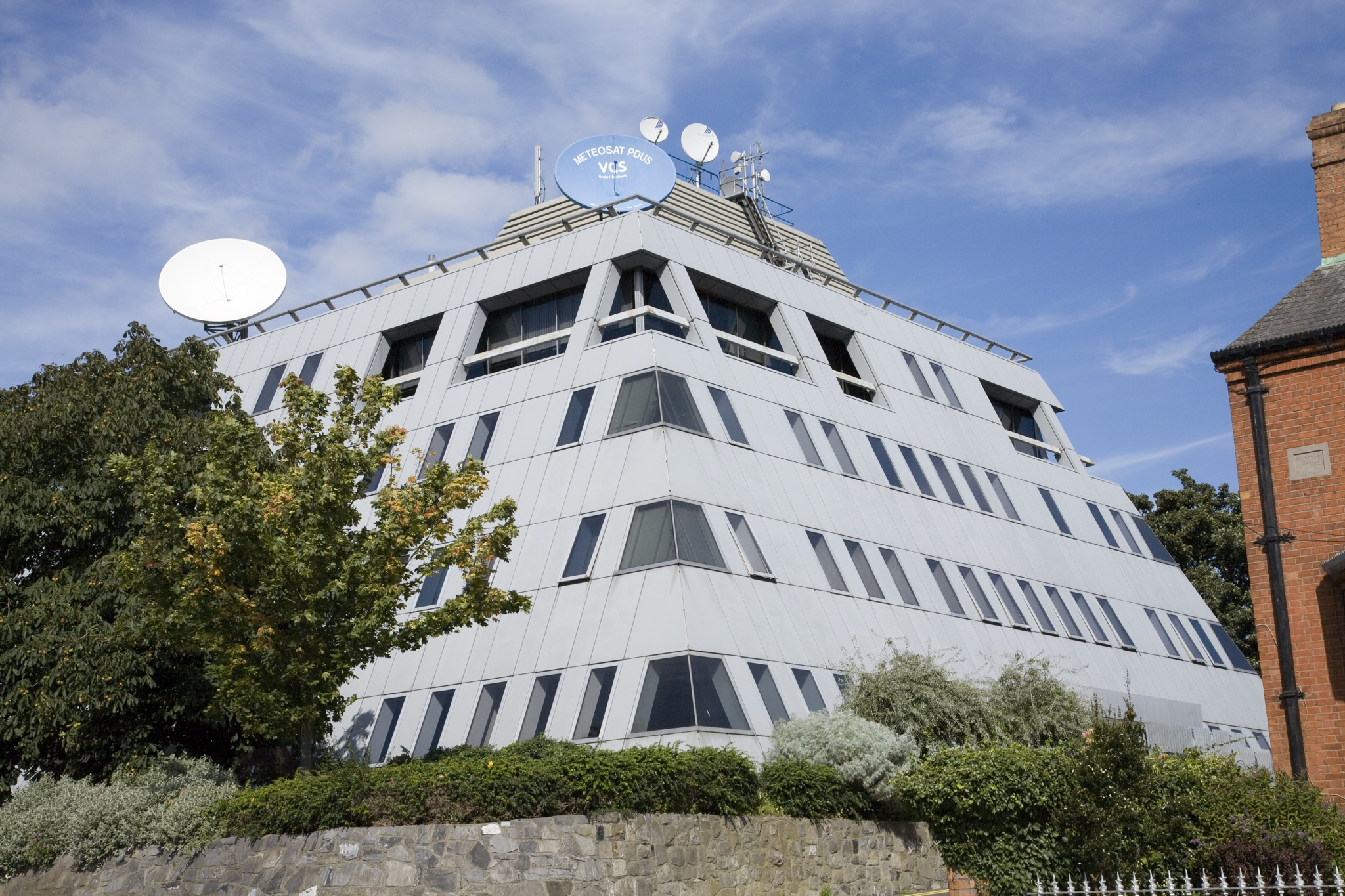
Met Éireann Building, Glasnevin, Dublin
