= RIAI Triennial Gold Medal =

Architecture award

The RIAI Triennial Gold Medal has been awarded since 1934 to the best building completed in the preceding three years by a member of the Royal Institute of the Architects of Ireland.

== Recipients ==
Years	Building	Architect
1932–1934	St Thomas' Church, Dublin	Frederick Hicks
1938–1940	Dublin Airport	Desmond Fitzgerald
1947–1949	Aspro Factory, Dublin	Alan Hope
1950–1952	Out-Patient's Department and Treatment Centre at St. Luke's Hospital, Rathgar	Thomas Kennedy
1953–1955	Busáras, Dublin	Michael Scott
1956–1958	College of Physical Education, Dominican Convent	Piaras Mac Cionnaith
1959–1961	Raidió Teilifís Éireann Studios	Michael Scott & Partners
1962–1964	GEC Factory	Michael Scott & Partners
1965–1967	Church of St Aengus, Burt	Liam McCormick
1968–1970	Restaurant Building, UCD	Robin Walker
1971–1973	Administration Building, UCD	Andrzej Wejchert
1974–1976	Irish Management Institute, Dublin	Arthur Gibney & Partners
1977–1979	Currency Centre, Dublin	Sam Stephenson
1980–1982	St. Brendan's Community School, Birr	Peter & Mary Doyle
1983–1985	Calvert House Offices, Belfast	Kennedy Fitzgerald Architects
1986–1988	Bolton Street, Dublin	Gilroy McMahon Architects
1989–1991	Tourist Office, Limerick	Murray Ó Laoire Architects
1992–1994	Ceide Fields Visitor Centre, Co Mayo	Mary McKenna
1995–1997	Library, Cork Institute of Technology	De Blacam & Meagher
1998–2000	Ranelagh Multidenominational School, Dublin	O'Donnell & Tuomey
2001–2003	Croke Park Development, Dublin	Gilroy McMahon Architects
2004–2006	Poustinia, Co. Tipperary	Tom Maher & Kevin Bates
2007–2009	Bocconi University, Milan	Grafton Architects
2010–2012	Lyric Theatre, Belfast	O'Donnell & Tuomey
2013–2015	Model School, Inchicore	Donaghy + Dimond
