= Atlantic Quarter =

Unrealised development in Cork, Ireland

The Atlantic Quarter was the name given to a proposed residential and commercial development in the docklands area of Cork city in Ireland. The 2008 proposal included the planned development of three tower-blocks on a 5-hectare site and a swing bridge over the River Lee. As of April 2017, the planned development had not been progressed. By 2018, the developer responsible for plans, Howard Holdings, was defunct and the site was put up for sale. The planning permission for the Atlantic Quarter plans expired in 2019.

== Proposals ==
The development was originally launched on 6 March 2008, with the planning application lodged the following day. The developers originally predicted that the complex would be complete by 2013. The project was described by its promoters as a potential "strategic counterweight" to Dublin's International Financial Services Centre.

The plan proposed the development of three tower-blocks, 51,000 m2 of office space, an event and conference centre, a hotel, 575 residential units, and space for bars, restaurants, and shops. The site proposed was to the east of Cork's city centre, on the south bank of the River Lee, at the former Ford Motor Company Distribution site in the "Marina Precinct". The proposed site was bounded by Centre Park Road to the north, Monahan Road to the south, and close to Páirc Uí Chaoimh stadium.

A swing bridge, which was proposed in the plans, was claimed by a representative of the developer to be "essential" for the project to proceed. The developer would design the structure, but reportedly requested that the Irish government fund the bridge's €80 million construction cost.

== Developer ==
The developer, Howard Holdings, was a Cork-based property company which had previously undertaken another redevelopment of Cork's docklands. The principal architect proposed for the project was Foster and Partners, with other design work by Scott Tallon Walker and Arup. The developer was defunct by 2018, and its assets put up for sale by the National Asset Management Agency (NAMA).
