= Ralph Henry Byrne =

Irish architect

- Born: 25 April 1877; Rathmines, Dublin, Ireland
- Died: 15 April 1946 (aged 68)
- Occupation: Architect

Ralph Henry Byrne (25 April 1877 – 15 April 1946) was an Irish architect. His father was the architect William Henry Byrne.

== Early life and education ==
He was born in Largo House, Rathmines, Dublin on 25 April 1877. His parents were William Henry, architect, and May Anna Gertrude Byrne (née Dillon). He had four brothers and one sister. He was educated at home and at St George's College, Weybridge. He was articled by his father from 1896 to 1901, becoming a partner in his father's firm in 1902 under the name William H. Byrne & Son. He spent six months apprenticed to Thomas Edward Marshall of Harrogate.

== Career ==
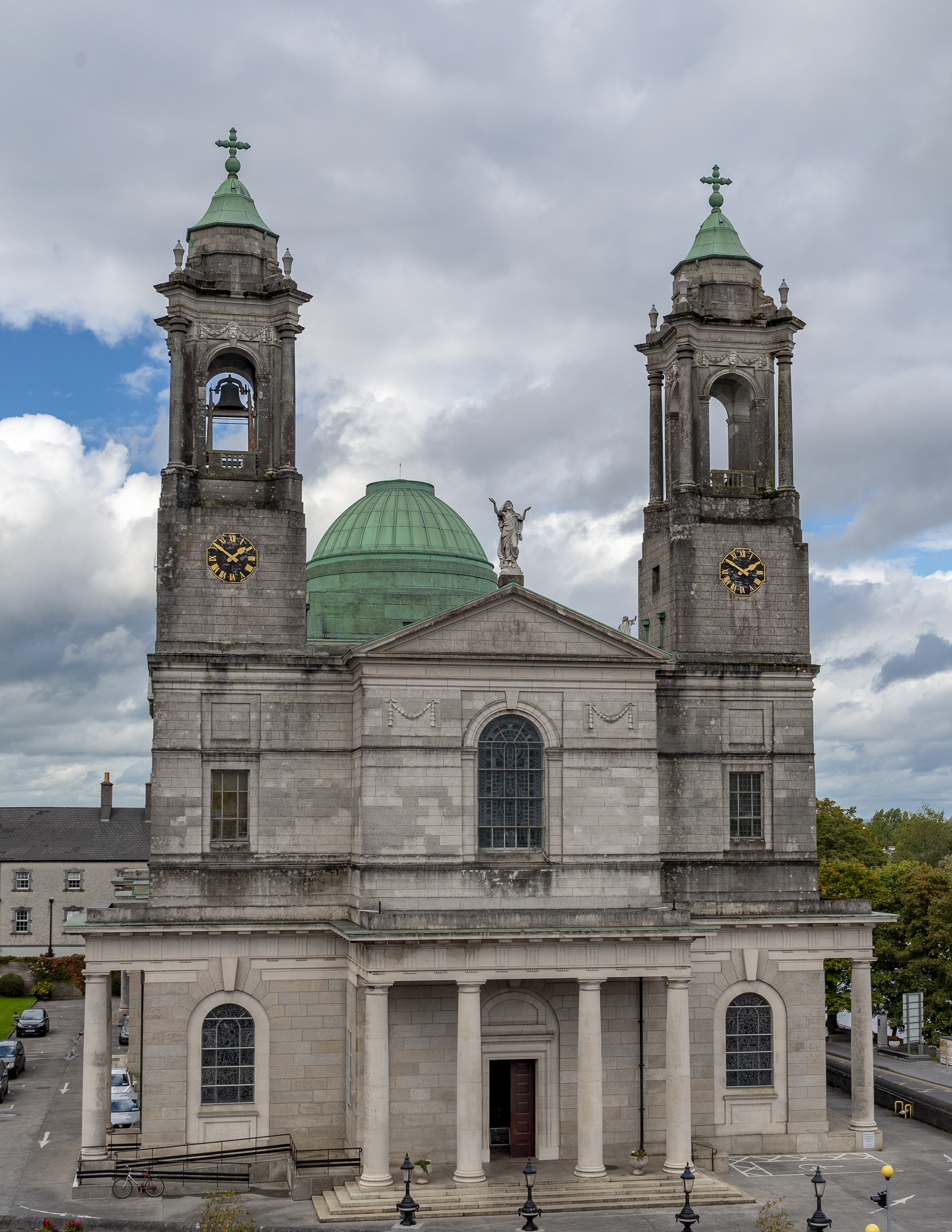
SS Peter and Paul's Church, Athlone

Byrne worked closely with his father, designing the church of St Agatha, North William Street, Dublin, which was completed in 1909. His father became blind in 1913, with Byrne taking over the practice. After his father's death, Byrne kept trading as William H. Byrne & Son. As well as designing buildings, Byrne was involved in reconstruction.

His assistants and students included Arnold Francis Hendy, Sheila Tindal and Guy Hemingway Yeoman. Simon Aloysius Leonard (1903–1976), his wife's nephew, became his partner in 1936. Byrne became a member of the Royal Institute of the Architects of Ireland in 1902, a fellow in 1920, and served as vice-president in 1938. He was a member of the Architectural Association of Ireland from 1906 to 1946.

== Notable buildings ==
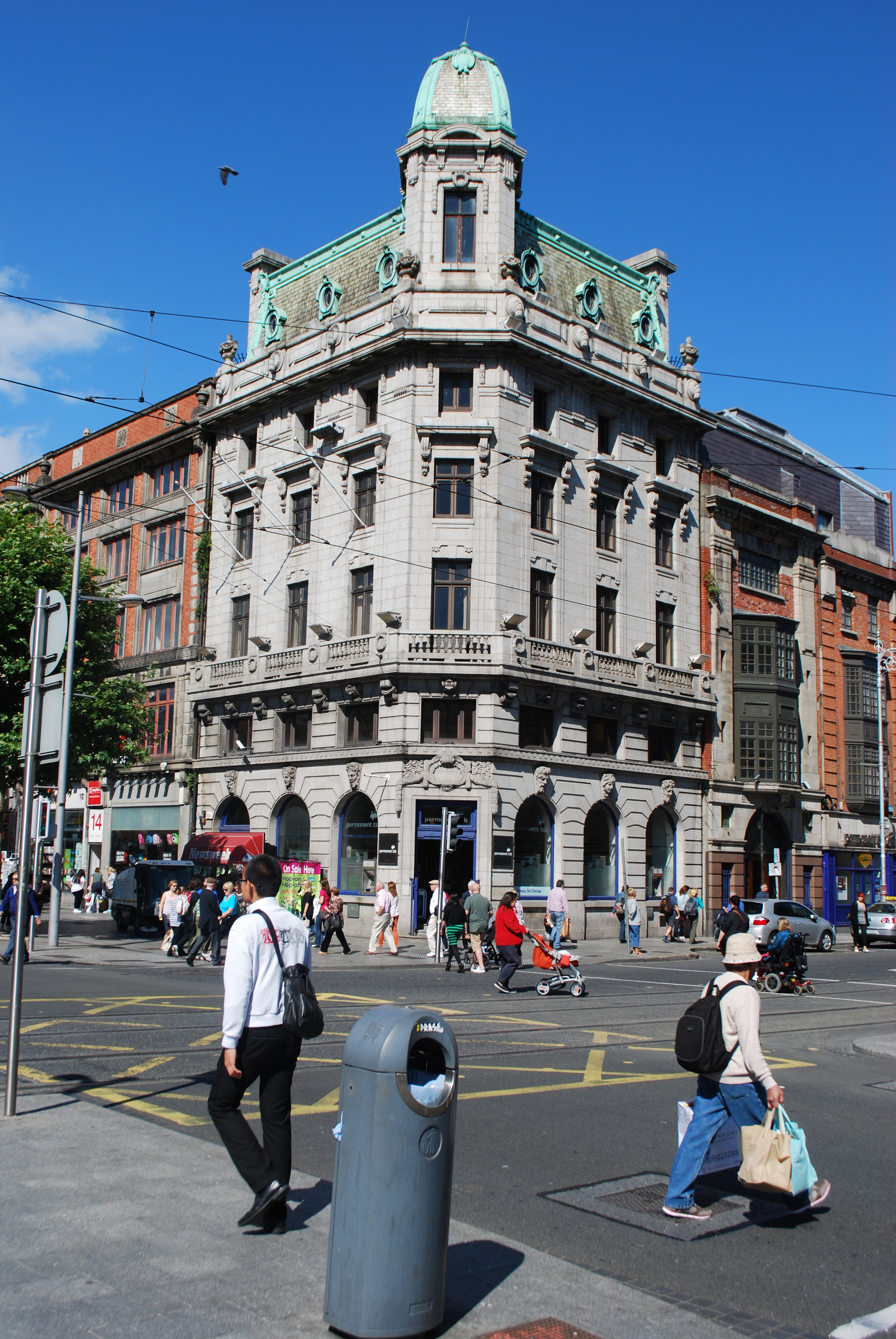
Former Hibernian Bank building, O'Connell Street, Dublin

- Hibernian Bank building (1917–1919), O'Connell Street
- National Maternity Hospital, Dublin (1937), possibly Europe's first fully electrified hospital
- SS Peter and Paul, Athlone, County Westmeath (commenced 1932)
- Church of the Sacred Heart, Cardonagh, County Donegal (1941–1945)
- SS Patrick and Felim, Cavan (dedicated 1942)

== Family and death ==
He married Mary Josephine Mangan (died 1947) of Dunboyne Castle on 21 November 1905. They had one son, Frank William Barrett Mangan Byrne (1910-30 May 1940), a captain in the Royal Irish Fusiliers.

He died in his home at 9 Ailesbury Road on 15 April 1946, and is buried in Glasnevin cemetery.
