= Helen Moloney =

Irish stained glass artist

- Born: 2 January 1926; Henry Street, Tipperary, Ireland
- Died: 6 March 2011 (aged 85); 5 Waterloo Road, Ballsbridge, Dublin
- Known for: stained glass

Helen Moloney (2 January 1926 – 6 March 2011) was an Irish stained glass artist, known for her work with architect Liam McCormick in the churches he designed throughout the 1960s and 1970s.

== Early life and family ==
Helen Moloney was born in Henry Street, Tipperary on 2 January 1926, one of a pair of twins with her sister Mary. Her parents were James (1896–1981) and Kathleen Barry Moloney. She had two younger sisters other than her twin, and a brother. Her younger sister Katherine (1928–1989) went on to marry Patrick Kavanagh after a long relationship. Both sides of Moloney's family were involved in the Irish republican movements. Her paternal grandfather, Patrick James Moloney (1869–1947), was a pharmaceutical chemist and Sinn Féin TD in Tipperary from 1919 to 1923, being re-elected in June 1922 as an anti-treaty candidate. Her father was an officer in the 2nd Southern Division and the 3rd Tipperary Brigade during the war of independence, serving with the anti-treaty IRA as director of communications. Her uncle, Con Moloney (1897/8–1951), was adjutant of the 2nd Southern Division serving under Ernie O'Malley and Liam Lynch. Moloney's mother was the older sister of Kevin Barry and was active in Cumann na mBan, the Gaelic League, and Sinn Féin. She worked in the Dáil Éireann Department of Home Affairs, and served as a judge of the republican courts. She toured America and Australia in the early 1920s raising money for the Irish republican cause and was the general secretary of the Irish Republican Prisoners' Dependants' Fund. Moloney's father was a chemist, and struggled to find work until he took a post with the Irish Sugar company in Carlow in 1934.

== Artistic career ==
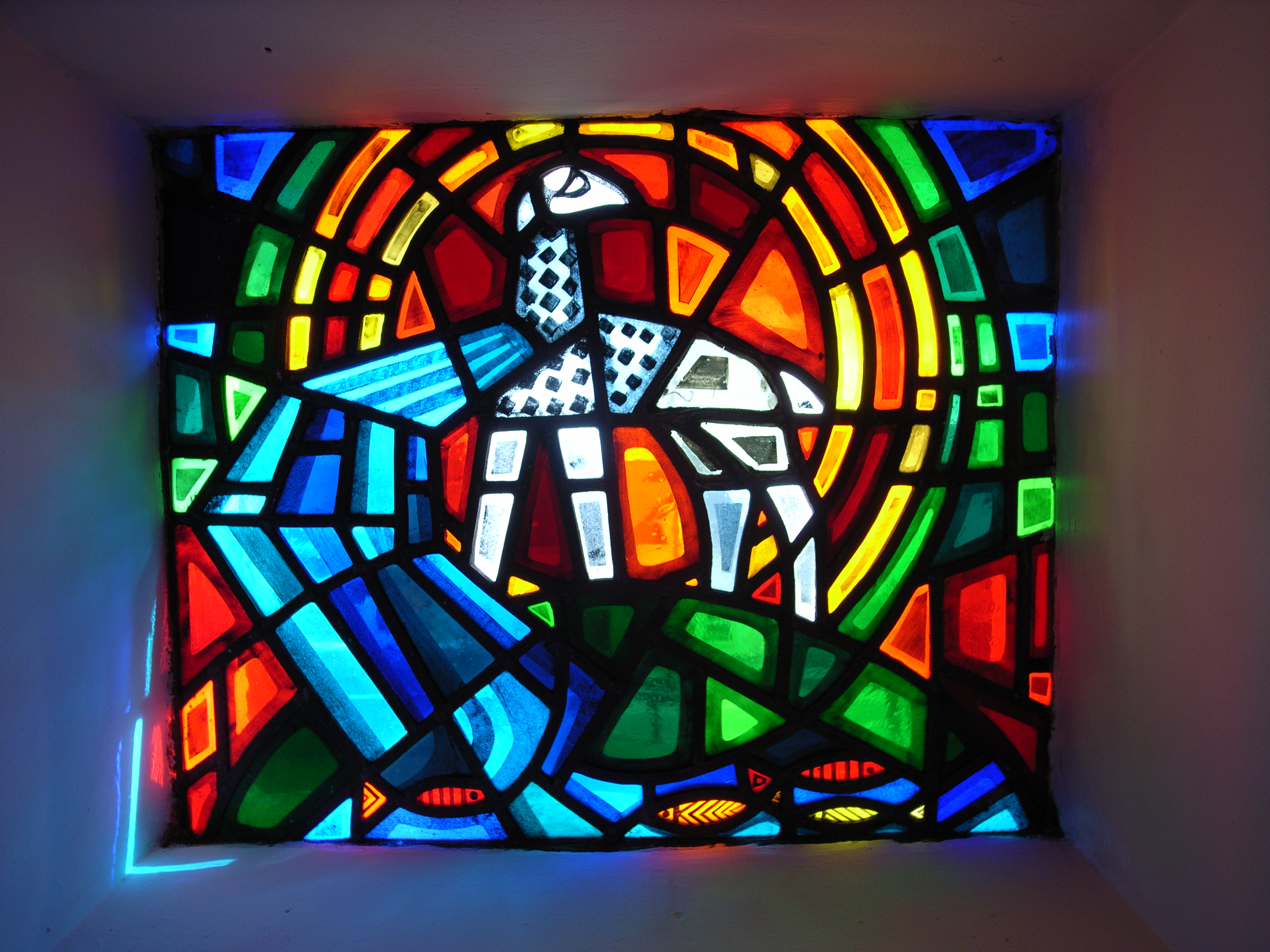
One of Moloney's windows at the Archangel Saint Michael Church, Creeslough

Moloney left school just before her 14th birthday, going on to study drawing part-time at the National College of Art (NCA) with Art O'Murnaghan. She was awarded a series of bursaries and awards which allowed her to attend full-time to train as a painter, and she graduated in 1948. She lived in Paris for nine months where she studied life drawing at the Académie de la Grande Chaumière, Montparnasse. In 1952, she returned to Dublin and moved into a studio flat at 5 Waterloo Road, Ballsbridge, Dublin, where she would live for the rest of her life. She took a position teaching art part-time at Blackrock Technical School from 1952 to 1964. Having seen the stained glass of Sainte-Chapelle and Notre Dame cathedral in Paris, and then seeing the memorial exhibition of work by Evie Hone in 1958, Moloney took up stained glass as her medium. Moloney studied stained glass under John Murphy (1921–2006) at NCA from 1958 to 1961. She went on to work as an assistant to Patrick Pollen at his studio on the premises of An Túr Gloine from 1960 to 1962. In 1962, she was exhibited at the third Salzburg Biennale of Sacred Art, and she assisted Pollen with the large commission for stained glass windows at a new church designed by Liam McCormick, St Patrick's church, Lifford, County Donegal, in 1964.

In 1964, having received a grant from the Arts Council, Moloney established her own studio where she worked full-time as a stained glass artist. She went on to work numerous times with McCormick on the Catholic churches he designed, completing 11 commissions for him. Her windows worked in keeping with the radical and modern architectural style of these buildings, using semi-abstract designs in strong primary colours against his white surfaces. Moloney was one of a group of craftspeople and artists McCormick assembled, including John Behan, Ruth Brandt, Ray Carroll, Oisín Kelly, Patrick McElroy, Patrick Pye, Veronica Rowe, and Imogen Stuart. Her first independent commission was on a McCormick church, Star of the Sea, Desertegney, County Donegal in 1964. The 1967 Church of St Aengus, Burt, County Donegal by McCormick featuring her work is one of the most famous and was awarded the gold medal from the Royal Institute of the Architects of Ireland for the period 1965–1967. The RIAI noted "the loving care that has been lavished on it by architect, builder, client, artists, craftsmen". The church was named the Irish building of the twentieth century in 2000 by the RIAI based on a public and RIAI members' vote.

In 1977, Moloney was commissioned to work on a non-catholic church, Donoughmore Presbyterian church, Liscooley, County Donegal, creating the windows and designing a reredos hanging depicting the burning bush. Other architects she worked with were Richard Hurley, Philip Shaffrey and Andrew Devane. Some of her last commissions were for St Stephen's church, Killiney, County Dublin, designed by Michael Brock, and St Francis of Assisi church, Drumnabey, County Tyrone, designed by Joe Treacy, both in 1982. Having struggled to finish a commission in the late 1980s, Moloney retired from making stained glass.

Moloney was elected to Aosdána in 1982. Despite her family's ardent political activities, Moloney herself was apolitical. Once she finished a work, she rarely returned to view her work or speak about it. Moloney died at her home in Dublin on 6 March 2011, and is buried at Glasnevin Cemetery.

== Selected works ==
- Our Lady Queen of Heaven at Dublin Airport (1964) - stained glass and stations of the cross set into the lateral walls
- Holy Family church, Southampton, England (1966)
- St Clement's retreat house chapel, Belfast (1967)
- Our Lady of Lourdes, Ballyconnell, County Cavan (1968)
- Church of St MacNissi, Magherahoney, County Antrim south-transept extension (1968)
- Archangel St Michael's church, Creeslough, County Donegal (1971) - stained glass, and designed the altar tapestry and inset enamels for the tabernacle
- St Mary's, Maghera, County Londonderry (1974) - seven eucharistic windows, the sanctuary cross, enamel insets fixed to the altar, ambo, font, and aluminium entrance doors
- St Joseph's church, Tinryland, County Carlow alterations (1974)
- St Oliver Plunkett church, Toome, County Antrim (1976)
- Our Lady of Lourdes, Steelstown, County Londonderry (1976) - altar and ambo insets and a painting of Christ on a wooden cross
- Christ Prince of Peace, Fossa, County Kerry (1977) - glass insets on entrance doors
- St Patrick's, Clogher, County Tyrone (1979) - stove-enamelled doors depicting Good Shepherd, tree of life, sun and moon
- St Columb's College, Derry (1979) - four stained glass windows commissioned by The College Union to mark the Centenary of the College
