= RIAI Travelling Scholarship =

Irish award for architecture

The RIAI Travelling Scholarship is an award made annually by the Royal Institute of the Architects of Ireland to one or more students of architecture attending a school of architecture in the Republic of Ireland or Northern Ireland.

The award has been made annually since 1935 and has former the basis for the careers of many notable Irish architects, among them Arthur Gibney, Sam Stephenson and Trevor Leaker.

Over the course of its history, the scholarship has been competed for in numerous ways. Current practice is for the RIAI to set a competition brief, which is then the subject of the design of a building or landscape by the competitors. An appointed jury of distinguished and learned architects and pedagogues then selects the winning entry.

In 2016 the award was renamed the RIAI Student Excellence Award.

Dates	Winner
1935	TG Nolan
1936	B Boyd-Barrett
1937	No Award
1938	No Award
1939	RS Scally
1940	No Award
1941	F Quinlan
1942	GM Crockett
1943 - 1946	Suspended
1947	RR Patterson
1948	Frederick Browne
1949	No Award
1950	Sylvester Bourke
1951	Francis J Barry
1952	No Award
1953	TA Austin
1954	Cathal O'Neill
1955	Arthur Gibney
1956	Sam Stephenson
1957	Joan McNeilly
1958	No Award
1959	Deirdre Shankey
1960	DV O'Connell
1961	No Award
1962	No Award
1963	Arthur P Martin
1964	Harry Conway
1965	Paul McNicholl
1966	Francis O'Meara
1967	Hugh Desmond
1968	Ian Hayes-McCoy
1969	David Crowley
1970	Desmond Crean
1971	David O'Connor & Diarmuid Twomey
1972	James D Barry & Deirdre O'Connor
1973	Peter D'Arcy, Marie Clear & Patricia McFarland
1974	Kieran Boughan & Paul Richardson
1975	Jerry O'Toole & Gerard Larkin
1976	Alfred E Jones
1977	No Award
1978	Sylvester Salley
1979	Michael Tallon
1980	Peter Bluett
1981	
1982	Grace Weldon
1983	Terence Thornhill
1984	
1985	
1986	
1987	
1988	
1989	
1990	
1991	Donough McCrann
1992	Trevor Leaker
1993	
1994	
1995	Róisín Hyde
1996	Emmett Scanlon
1997	
1998	Patrick Gilsenan & Shane O'Neill
1999	Conor Cooney
2000	
2001	
2002	Paul Osborne
2003	James McGrory
2004	Jonathan Cassidy
2005	Jane Larmour
2006	Michael Bannon
2007	Deirdre McKenna
2008	Cormac Maguire
2009	
2010	Breffni Greene
2011	John Walsh & Darren Snow
2012	
2013	
2014	
2015	
2016	Sean Mahon
2017	Rebecca Jane McConnell, Matthew Kernan, Mark Phelan & Rachel Loughrey
2018	Stephen Gotting
2019	Megan Quirey
2020	Eoghan Smith
2021	Harry Lloyd
2022	Noah Brabazon
2023	Daniesha Pile & David McEvoy
2024	Kevin Barry & Rachel Murphy
