= St. Luke's Hospital, Rathgar =

St. Luke's Hospital, Rathgar (formally Saint Luke's Hospital)
- Health Service Executive

- Shown in Dublin

Geography
- Location: Rathgar, Dublin, Ireland
- Coordinates: 53.311134°N 6.268666°W

Organisation
- Care system: HSE
- Type: Specialist

Services
- Speciality: Cancer Radiotherapy

History
- Founded: 1952

Links
- Website: www.slh.ie

St. Luke's Hospital (Irish: Ospidéal Naomh Lúcás), is a hospital in Rathgar, Dublin, Ireland which has specialised in treating cancer patients from throughout Ireland for over half a century. It is the primary national centre for radiotherapy treatment.

== History ==
Opened in 1952, the hospital was founded by the Cancer Association of Ireland on the recommendation of a consultative body set in place by the Minister for Health. The main building was designed by the Irish architect Thomas Kennedy. He was awarded the RIAI Triennial Gold Medal for the period 1950–52 by the Royal Institute of the Architects of Ireland for his design of St. Luke's Hospital.

Following the publication of a report by Professor Donal Hollywood entitled "The Development of Radiation Oncology Services in Ireland" in 2003, the Department of Health and Children decided to create cancer treatment centres of excellence in the Beaumont Hospital and St. James's Hospital. St Luke's Radiation Oncology Network (SLRON) Radiotherapy centres were built within the grounds of the Beaumont Hospital and St James's Hospital and operate as part of a three site network. Mary Harney, Minister for Health and Children introduced the Health (Miscellaneous Provisions) Bill which provided for the dissolution of the St Luke's Hospital Board and the transfer of the remaining services from St Luke's Hospital to the Health Service Executive. Since then there has been a campaign to reverse the Minister's decision to close St. Luke's Hospital. This campaign includes famous figures from the world of Irish politics that have had first hand experience of St. Luke's including Ruairi Quinn. Mary Harney subsequently clarified, that even after oncology services were transferred, St. Luke's Hospital would be retained as a public health facility.

== Friends of St. Luke's ==
St. Luke's has been significantly funded over the last three decades by a dedicated charity, Friends of St. Luke's.
