= Transport House, Belfast =

UK listed building

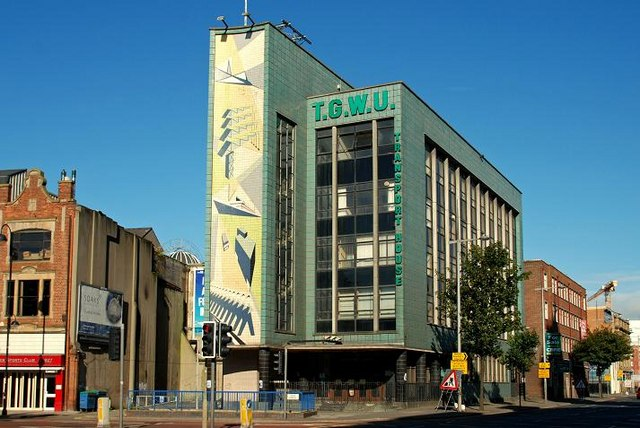
- Transport House, 2009
- Interactive map of the Transport House, Belfast area

General information
- Status: Offices
- Type: Modernist
- Architectural style: International Style
- Location: 102 High Street, Belfast, Northern Ireland
- Coordinates: 54°36′04″N 5°55′30″W
- Construction started: 1956
- Opened: 1959
- Owner: Unite

Technical details
- Floor count: 7

Design and construction
- Architect: J.J.Brennan
- Main contractor: Carville & Sons Ltd
- Designations: Grade B+

Transport House is a 20th Century Grade B+ listed building located in Belfast, Northern Ireland. Construction started in 1956 and it was completed in 1959 as offices for the Amalgamated Transport & General Workers Union. It is one of Northern Ireland's youngest listed buildings.

It was designed by J. J. Brennan, inspired by the contemporary design of Busáras, the bus offices and terminus in Dublin designed by Michael Scott that was opened in 1953. Transport House consists of two blocks, one seven stories high and the other five. The taller building is supported at one end by two narrow columns (piloti) covered in black tiles. Much of the buildings are clad in pale green tiles, but concrete cladding and brown bricks are also visible in places. One of the narrow sides of the seven-story building is concave and decorated with a tiled mural (tiled by Robert Ross of Carrickfergus) showing stylised images of industries such as ship-building cranes, a plane and a factory, as well as male workers. The style is Soviet Constructivist.

The building was listed in 1994.

== Present ==
By 2012, the building was unoccupied but owned by Unite. Although partly boarded up it was considered to be in good condition. In 2019, plans were announced to relocate the union's office back to Transport House In 2021, these plans were re-announced.
