= Harold Edgar Coyle =

- Born: 31 January 1882; Dalkey, County Dublin, Ireland
- Died: 19 January 1961
- Other names: Harold Coyle
- Occupation: Architect

Harold Edgar Coyle, RIAI (31 January 1882 – 19 January 1961) was an Irish architect of Dún Laoghaire and Dublin and pupil or assistant of Sir Thomas Drew, for whom he supervised the execution in 1911 of the brass memorial tablet in Christ Church Cathedral, Dublin by the firm of Sharpe & Emery.

Born in County Dublin, he was the youngest son of Benjamin Coyle of Derrymore, Dalkey. He moved to England around 1925. He was a member of the AAI from 1903 to 1913; Royal Institute of Architects in Ireland from 1919 to 1929, 1940–1946.
