= Scott Tallon Walker =

Irish architectural practice

Scott Tallon Walker Architects
- Industry: Architecture, construction
- Founded: 1931
- Headquarters: Dublin, Ireland
- Key people: Michael Tallon, Executive Chairman; Ronan Phelan, managing director
- Services: Architecture, interior design, healthcare design, urban design and planning
- Website: www.stwarchitects.com

Scott Tallon Walker is an architecture practice with its head office in Dublin, Ireland and further offices in London, Galway and Cork. It is one of the largest architecture practices in Ireland. Established in 1931 as Scott and Good, becoming Michael Scott Architect in 1938, and Michael Scott and Partners in 1957 before changing to the current Scott Tallon Walker in 1975. Scott Tallon Walker and its earlier incarnations developed a reputation for modernism.

== History ==
The firm was started by Michael Scott, described in some sources as one of the "most important architect[s] of the twentieth century in Ireland", with Norman D. Good and was called Scott and Good. The firm initially developed a reputation for designing hospitals.

In 1938, Michael Scott broke his partnership with Norman D. Good to form 'Michael Scott Architect'. During the Second World War the firm survived on small commissions, and following the war went on to work for the Córas Iompair Éireann (CIÉ), the national transport company, and designed such buildings as Donnybrook Bus Garage (together with Ove Arup, who set up Arup's first overseas office in Dublin at the request of Michael Scott), and Dublin Central Bus Station (Busaras).

In 1957 the firm was recast as 'Michael Scott and Partners', with Ronnie Tallon and Robin Walker becoming partners in the practice. The design work from this period becoming more modern, influenced by Robin Walker's previous experience of working with Le Corbusier in Paris and studying under Mies van der Rohe in Chicago, and resulted in buildings such as the RTÉ Radio Building, the Bank of Ireland Headquarters in Baggot Street (1968–1978) and the former P.J. Carroll's Factory (1967–69) in Dundalk, County Louth, which has also recently been added to Ireland's list of protected structures. In 1975 the firm was renamed 'Scott Tallon Walker' following the retirement of the company's founder, Michael Scott, and the firm was awarded the prestigious RIBA Gold Medal. Robin Walker retired from the company in 1982.

In December 2010, Dr Ronnie Tallon KHS was awarded the James Gandon Medal, a new lifetime achievement award from the Royal Institute of the Architects of Ireland. In the citation he was called "one of the most influential Irish architects of the last century".

== Notable buildings ==
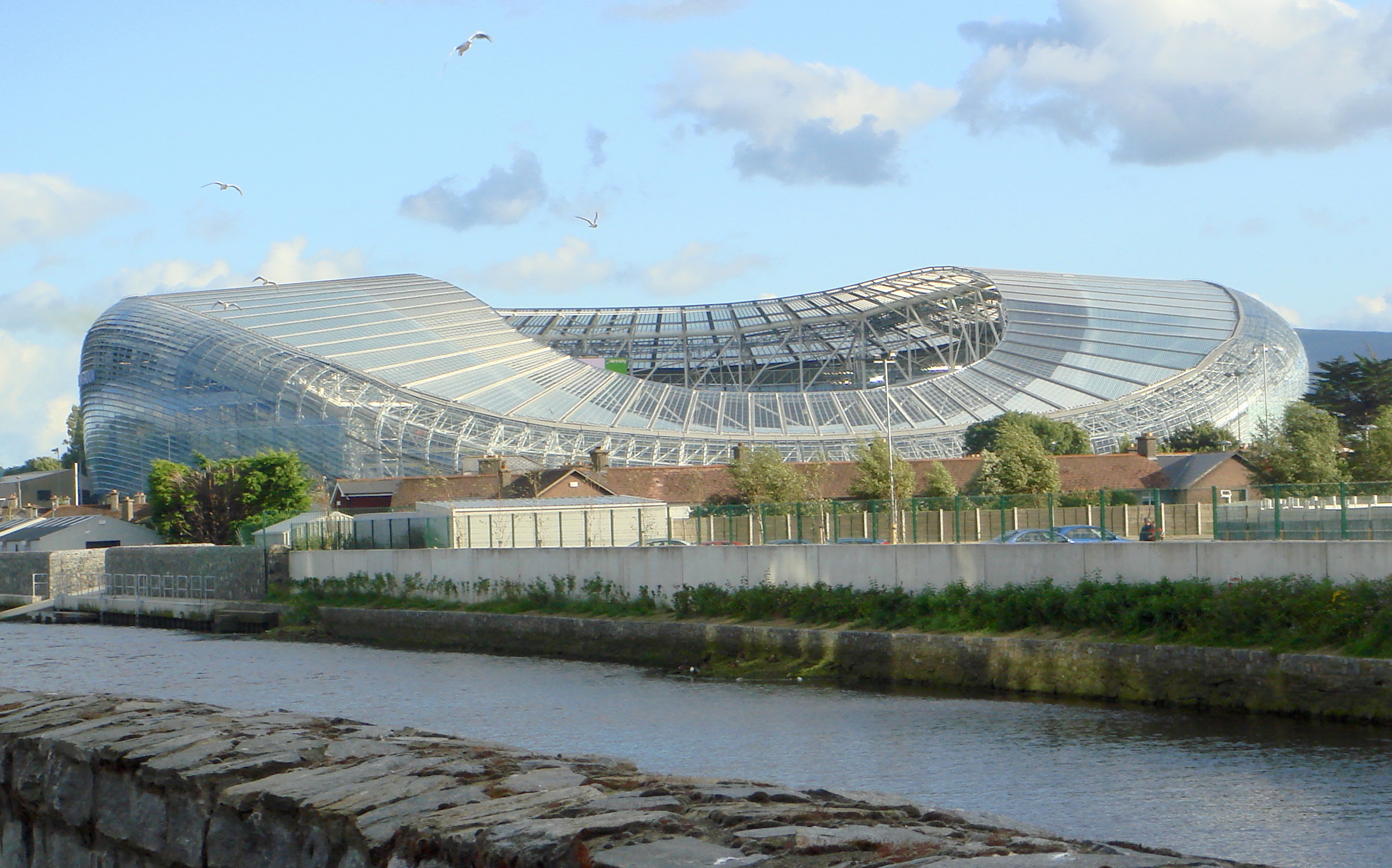
Aviva Stadium

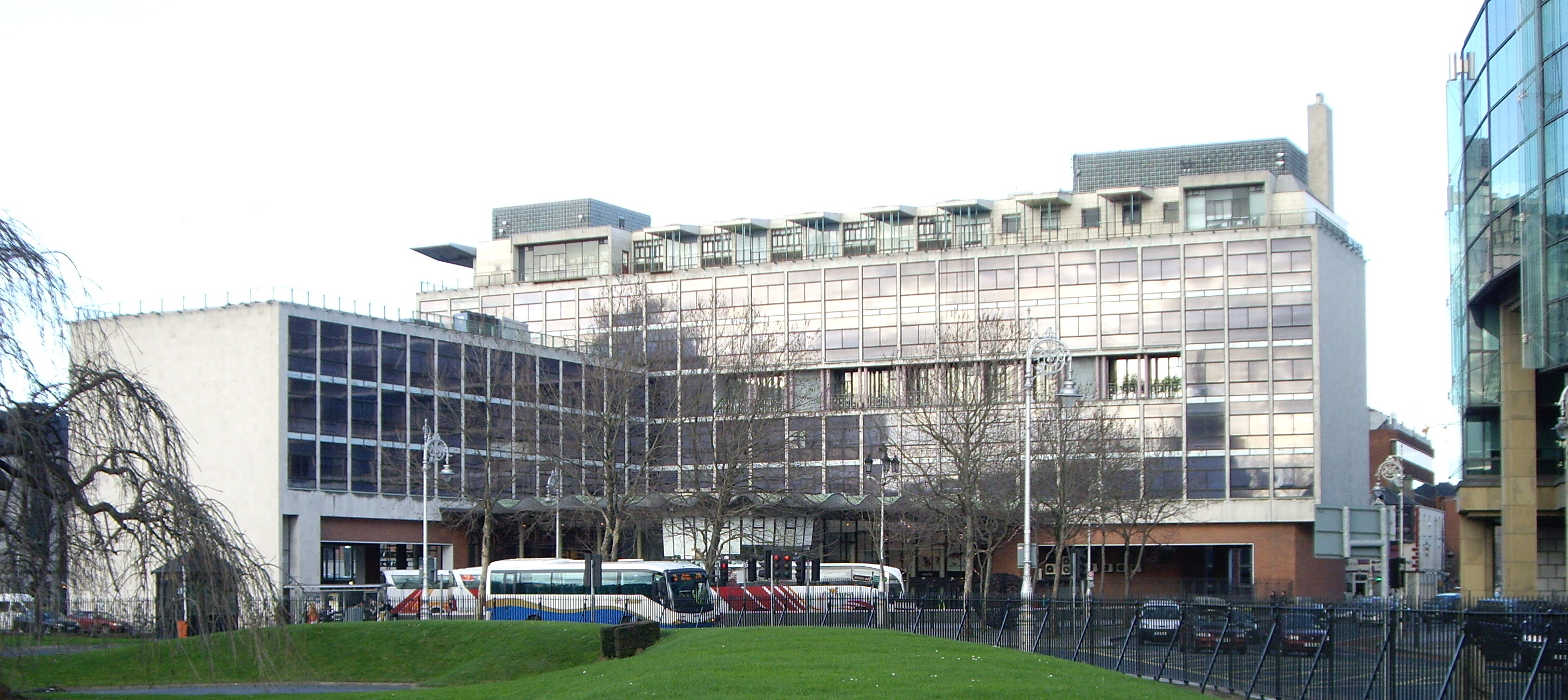
Busáras in 2008

The company has been responsible for many influential and recognisable buildings in Ireland, such as the Dublin central bus station, known as Busáras, completed in 1953, which was one of the first buildings of the modern style in Ireland. The firm attempted to bring art and architecture together, commissioning art to be incorporated in their buildings (such as at Busáras). The artists Patrick Scott and art critic Dorothy Walker both worked for the firm, and played a significant part in its architecture. The firm also worked with Louis le Brocquy and commissioned work from him and his wife Anne Madden.

The Aviva Stadium in Dublin, Ireland, on the site of the old Lansdowne Road site, was designed by Populous in collaboration with Scott Tallon Walker Architects. The sustainably-built stadium features a host of green building features that enable it to integrate into its site while making the most of available resources. Designed as a sweeping crystalline bowl, the stadium harvests rainwater to irrigate the field, reuses waste heat for hot water, and is topped with a transparent roof that allows daylight to suffuse the interior spaces.

=== Buildings with awards ===
- Keeper House and Lodge, 2015: Irish Architecture Awards (Best House – Winner), 2016; World Architecture Festival, (House Category - Finalist)
- Aviva Stadium, 2010: Plan Expo (AAI) (OPUS Award – Winner)
- The Gibson Hotel, Point Village, 2010: The Association of Landscape Contractors of Ireland (ALCI) (Overall Award for Landscaping in Ireland)
- St. Patrick's Place Development, Cork, 2010: Royal Institute of the Architects of Ireland (RIAI Best Sustainable Building)
- McCann FitzGerald Headquarters, 2010: Architectural Association of Ireland (AAI) (Architectural Association of Ireland Excellence in Architectural Design)
- Commissioners of Irish Lights Headquarters, 2008: Royal Institute of the Architects of Ireland (RIAI Best Public Building)
- Tulach a' tSolais Memorial, 1998 – 2000: Royal Institute of the Architects of Ireland (RIAI Gold Medal) Highly Commended
- East Point Business Park, 1999: Regional Award Royal Institute of the Architects of Ireland
- Dublin Civic Offices, 1996: Regional Award Royal Institute of the Architects of Ireland
- University College Dublin – Biotechnology Building, 1994: Irish Architecture Award Architectural Association of Ireland (Dublin – Over £200,000)
- Busaras, 1953–55: Royal Institute of the Architects of Ireland (RIAI Gold Medal) Winner
- Radio Telefís Éireann Studios, 1959–61: Royal Institute of the Architects of Ireland (RIAI Gold Medal) Winner
- G.E.C. Factory, 1962–64: Royal Institute of the Architects of Ireland (RIAI Gold Medal) Winner
- House at Summercove, 1965–67: Royal Institute of the Architects of Ireland (RIAI Medal for Housing) Winner
- Restaurant Building, UCD, 1968–70: Royal Institute of the Architects of Ireland (RIAI Gold Medal) Winner
- Ronald Tallon House, 1971–73: Royal Institute of the Architects of Ireland (RIAI Medal for Housing) Winner
- John and Aileen O`Reilly Library, Dublin City University, 2002: SCONUL Library Design Award.

=== Other notable projects ===
- Carroll's Cigarette Factory, Dundalk (Now part of Dundalk Institute of Technology)
- Gate Theatre, Dublin
- 1 St Mary's Lane, Ballsbridge, Dublin, Ireland
- Papal Cross, Phoenix Park, Dublin

== References and sources ==
Notes

Sources

- Dorothy Walker (1997) Modern art in Ireland. Dublin: Liliput, ISBN 1-874675-96-1.
- John O'Regan (2006) Scott Tallon Walker Architects: 100 Buildings and Projects 1960–2005. Dublin: Gandon Editions, ISBN 0-946641-52-8.
- Michael Scott: Architect – in (Casual) Conversation with Dorothy Walker. Dublin: Gandon Editions (December 1996), ISBN 0-946641-51-X
