= Kathleen Barry Moloney =

Irish republican activist and trade unionist

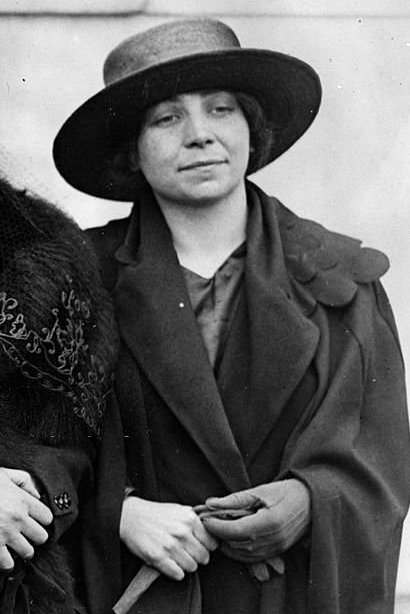
- Barry in 1924
- Born: Catherine Agnes Barry; 19 October 1896; 8 Fleet Street, Dublin, Ireland
- Died: 10 January 1969 (aged 72); Meath Hospital, Dublin
- Organisations: Gaelic League; Cumann na mBan
- Political party: Sinn Féin
- Relatives: Kevin Barry (Brother)

Kathleen "Kathy" Barry Moloney (19 October 1896 - 10 January 1969) was an Irish republican activist, and trade unionist. She was the elder sister of Kevin Barry, an Irish republican rebel who was executed in 1920.

== Early life ==
Kathleen Barry Moloney was born Catherine Agnes Barry at 8 Fleet Street, Dublin on 19 October 1896. Her parents were Thomas (died 1908), prosperous dairy owner, and Mary Barry (née Dowling, died 1953). Both her parents were from County Carlow. She was the eldest of seven siblings, with four sisters, Sheila (or Shel), Eileen (or Elgin), Mary Christina (or Maureen or Monty) and Margaret (or Peggy or Peg), and two brothers, Michael and Kevin. The Barry family owned an 86-acre dairy farm at Tombeagh, Hacketstown, County Carlow, as well as a shop on the ground floor of their Fleet Street home. After the death of her father, some of the family, including Moloney stayed in Dublin with her paternal aunt Judith. Her mother returned to the Tombeagh farm with her younger children.

== Republican activities ==
She and Kevin attended a commemoration of the Manchester martyrs at the Mansion House in November 1915. During the reorganisation of the Irish Volunteers after the Easter Rising in 1916, the Barrys provided a line of communication between the Carlow Brigade and the Dublin HQ. Her brother Michael went on to become the battalion OC in Carlow. While she was a committed republican, Moloney was restricted in her activities as she had to help her mother and aunt care for her younger siblings and manage the family business.

In 1917, she joined the Gaelic League and Sinn Féin. She was working as a private secretary to Ernest Aston when Kevin was arrested and convicted for his part in the death of 3 British soldiers in September 1920. Aston attempted to secure a reprieve from the murder conviction Kevin was handed down. After the execution of her brother, Moloney became immersed in republican activities. She joined the university branch of Cumann na mBan in late 1920, where she would occasionally carry guns and messages, and cleared any incriminating evidence from sites that were in danger of being raided. She worked in the Dáil Éireann Department of Home Affairs under Austin Stack, and was a judge in the republican courts.

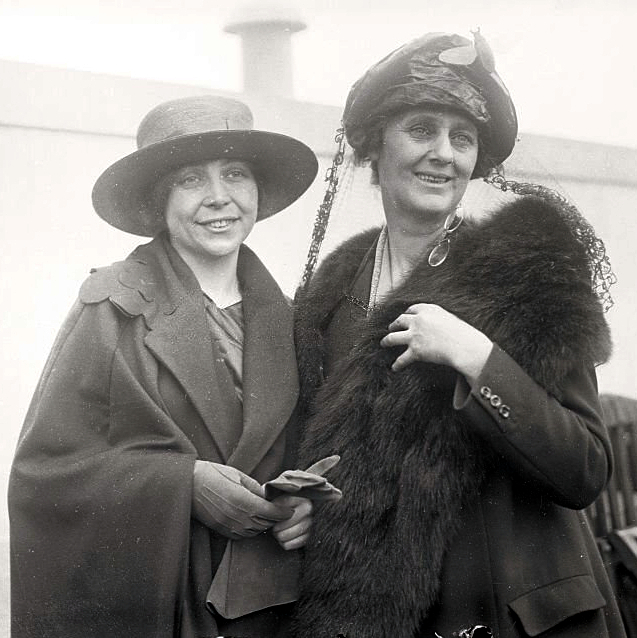
Barry with Constance Markiewicz in 1924 while fundraising in the US

At Éamon de Valera's request, Moloney was one of a delegation of seven republicans, with Stack, Countess Markievicz, and Michael O'Flanagan, which travelled to the United States to raise funds and publicity for the republican cause from April to June 1922. While on this tour, she also spoke at numerous public meetings. At the outbreak of the Irish Civil War, she was one of several Cumann na mBan women, including Maire Comerford, Muriel MacSwiney, Countess Markievicz and Linda Kearns, who stayed behind with the relocated anti-treaty headquarters garrison in the Hammam Hotel after they lost the Four Courts. The women survived a week-long siege under heavy shelling by the forces of the Free State. She and Linda Kearns were with the Republican leader Cathal Brugha at the Hamman hotel when he was shot and killed (7 July 1922). From June 1922, she was an active member of the Irish Republican Prisoners' Dependants' Fund, taking the role of general secretary from December 1922 until September 1924, which saw her travel across Ireland to distribute relief. During this work, she was arrested for possession of papers relating to the Fund, and was imprisoned with the general population in Cork County Jail. She went on hunger strike until she and colleague were transferred to the Cork City Jail in early 1923. Between September 1924 and April 1925, she toured Australia raising money for the Fund.

== Family and later career ==
On 8 September 1924 she married James Moloney (1896–1981) in Westland Row church. He was a recently released republican prisoner whose father, Patrick James Moloney (1869–1947), was a pharmaceutical chemist and Sinn Féin TD in Tipperary from 1919 to 1923, being re-elected in June 1922 as an anti-treaty candidate. James and his two brothers were all members of the Irish Volunteers and during the War of Independence served in the 3rd Tipperary Brigade. He returned to the family medical hall in Tipperary town to work as a chemist after his release, where Moloney joined him after her Australian tour. At this time, she withdrew from politics to raise her family of four daughters, twins Helena and Mary, Katherine and Judy, and one son, Patrick. Helena went on to become a stained-glass artist, and Katherine married the poet Patrick Kavanagh. When Moloney's mother-in-law remarried, the ownership and management of the medical hall was contested, leading to her husband struggling to find stable employment. This led to him taking work away from the family home.

Moloney returned to work after the birth of her fifth child to become a sales publicity advisor with the ESB from 1930 to 1950, for a number of years she was the family's chief earner. With the help of Seán MacEntee, in 1934 her husband was given a clerical position with Irish Sugar in Carlow. During the 1930s, the family moved to Carrickmines, County Dublin, and later 3 Palmerston Road, Rathmines, and 4 Winton Avenue, Rathgar. She was an active member of the Women's Industrial Development Association from 1932 to 1939 as well as the Amalgamated Transport and General Workers' Union. She was a representative for the women staff in the ESB from 1942 to 1950. She took early retirement due to ill health.

The Moloneys offered some support to Fianna Fáil in the 1930s, but opposed the executions of republican prisoners during the Emergency. In the late 1940s they supported the launch of Clann na Poblachta. Moloney died due to complications from a stroke on 10 January 1969 in Meath Hospital, Dublin, and is buried in Glasnevin Cemetery. Her papers are held in the University College Dublin archives, deposited by her grandson, Dr Eunan O’Halpin in 1990.
