= John Cole (architect) =

British architect (21st century)

John Senan Cole CBE is an architect from Northern Ireland. Previously working with the Northern Ireland Civil Service, as of 2021 he was an "independent consultant [..for..] public-sector infrastructure projects".

== Career ==
From 1996 to 1998, he served as president of the Royal Society of Ulster Architects.

He was chief executive of Health Estates Agency (2003-2008) and later deputy secretary and chief estates officer at DHSSPS from 2008-2013.

In 2013, he retired from the role of deputy secretary and chief estates officer (DHSSPS). Also in 2013, he was commissioned to revise the DCAL Policy for Architecture and the Built Environment.

In 2016, he was commissioned to review the closure of several schools in the City of Edinburgh Council area. The resulting report, titled "Report of the Independent Inquiry into the Construction of Edinburgh Schools", also known as the "Cole Report", was published in February 2017.

In 2018 he was made an Honorary Fellow of the Royal Institute of the Architects of Ireland.

Preceded by Aileen Hull	RSUA President; 1996–1998	Succeeded by Clyde Markwell
