= Deirdre O'Connor (architect) =

Irish architect (1951–1999)

- Born: 25 September 1951; Ranelagh, Dublin
- Died: 3 October 1999 (aged 48)
- Resting place: Kilquade new cemetery, County Wicklow

Deirdre O'Connor FRIAI (25 September 1951 – 3 October 1999) was an Irish architect. She was the first female president of the Architectural Association of Ireland.

== Life ==
Deirdre O'Connor was born in Ranelagh, Dublin on 25 September 1951. She was the eldest of the five children of engineer, Brendan O'Connor, and Sheelagh O'Connor (née McManus). Her father died in 1964 when O'Connor was 13, with her mother remarrying to Dermod Rush in 1967. She had five brothers. O'Connor enrolled in the College of Technology, Bolton Street, Dublin in 1968, winning the Royal Institute of the Architects of Ireland (RIAI) and Architectural Association of Ireland (AAI) combined prize in 1971 and a travelling scholarship in 1972. She qualified with a Diploma in Architecture in 1973.

From 1973 to 1974, O'Connor was a member of the committee of the AAI, going on become joint secretary and treasurer from 1974 to 1975, and serving as vice-president from 1975 to 1976. Until 1976 she worked with Robinson Keefe & Devane, being elected MRIAI the same year, and was elected the first female president of the AAI and served as the AAI representative to the RIAI council. In 1976 she won the Cement Roadstone housing research fellowship at the school of architecture in UCD, going on to become a tutor there from 1977 to 1990. The result of her research was Housing in Dublin's inner city, published in 1979.

In 1978 O'Connor joined Arthur Gibney & Partners, Dublin, going on to become a partner in 1981. From 1985 to 1986 she was the chairman of the public affairs division of the RIAI, being elected a fellow in 1987. O'Connor was the architect overseeing the redevelopment of the former Albert College, Ballymun in 1988. She served as a visiting critic at the Dublin Institute of Technology school of architecture, Bolton Street from 1989 to 1992, and as an external examiner in 1993, 1995 and 1996. She was involved in the design of the buildings at the new Dublin City University, designing the James Larkin lecture theatre which when onto win the RIAI regional award in 1992. In 1993, she co-edited the Phaidon architectural guide to Dublin with John Graby.

For 15 years, O'Connor sat on the RIAI council, serving as vice-president in 1991 and 1994, and for five years on the editorial board of the RIAI journal Irish Architect. She served as the convenor of the RIAI gold medal jury from 1989 to 1991, and chairman from 1992 to 1994. She retired from full-time practice in August 1999.

O'Connor died from cancer on 3 October 1999, and is buried beside her parents at Kilquade new cemetery, County Wicklow. In May 2000 the RIAI established a medal in her honour.

== Selected works ==
- New elevation and esplanade at Dr Steevens' Hospital, Dublin, for the Eastern Health Board (1992)
- Bookend apartment building at Essex Quay, Dublin (1992)
- Restaurant Patrick Guilbaud, 21 Merrion Street, Dublin (1997)
