= Architects' Alliance of Ireland =

Irish architects' advocacy group

- Abbreviation: AAoI
- Formation: 2009
- Type: Advocacy group
- Purpose: Architects' registration
- Region served: Ireland
- Chairperson: Margaret Kirwan
- Main organ: Committee of officers
- Website: http://www.architectsalliance.ie/

The Architects' Alliance of Ireland (AAoI) (Irish: Ailtirí 'Comhaontas na hÉireann) is an Irish pressure group founded in 2009. Its purpose is to lobby for a change in recent legislation in Ireland.

Part 3 of the Building Control Act 2007 requires long-established self-trained architects to undergo assessments before continuing to practice. The Alliance regards the present assessment test as inappropriate and overly expensive. It sees itself as in conflict with the Royal Institute of the Architects of Ireland.

The Alliance has declared its founders to be Leonard Barrett (Midleton), Liam Hazel (Skibbereen), Brian Montaut (Bray) and Adrian Turner (Athlone).

== The foundation and aims of the Alliance ==
The Architects' Alliance of Ireland (AAoI) was formed at the start of 2009 in response to Part 3 of the Building Control Act 2007. The Act sought for the first time to control the use of the term "architect" in the Republic of Ireland. Prior to the passing of the Act any practitioner could legally use the title architect. The Royal Institute of the Architects of Ireland (RIAI) claims that it is to protect the consumer that the Building Control Act protected the title.

The AAoI is lobbying for an amendment of the legislation to allow self-taught and other qualified practitioners, established seven years prior to the enforcement of the Building Control Act 2007, to be automatically registered as architects without undergoing examinations that they consider discriminative. AAoI claims that automatic registration is a privilege that was offered to established RIAI members. It also claims that the current assessment is designed by the RIAI to fail the large majority of applicants. In May 2010 and July 2012 it gave evidence before an Oireachtas (national parliament) committee, the Joint Committee on the Environment, Heritage and Local Government.

The group is arguing for a grandfather clause and is lobbying for an amendment to that effect before the RIAI, TDs, Ministers and the European Commission. It claims to have found inconsistencies in the legislation and its implementation, and has complained to the Irish Government, the Competition Authority of Ireland, and the European Commission. The lobbying efforts of the Alliance gained the support of John O'Donoghue TD who has tabled The Building Control (Amendment) Bill 2010. Due to a change in government the bill was never presented in front of the Dail (lower house of the Irish Parliament).

AAoI is concerned about the RIAI having a monopoly on architecture in the Republic of Ireland. The RIAI has represented the profession in Ireland since 1839, prior to the creation of the Republic of Ireland, when the country was still under the influence of British rules. Members and supporters of the RIAI claim that their institute has been involved in the training and governing of architects for many years, that it played a very important role in ensuring high standards in the profession. The AAoI claims that the RIAI is a limited company which has used its influence in front and within the government for the Building Control Act to suit RIAI interests as well as the interest of RIAI members and directors. The AAoI claims that the registration system set up by the RIAI favours the Institution's own members while discriminating against others, especially self-taught architects. The RIAI claims that the registration system simply recognises that RIAI members have already passed rigorous professional examinations and assessments similar to those required by the new legislation. On this ground, the AAoI stated that its members are ready to pass a similar examination (so-called part 3), but are opposed to the actual examinations specially designed for self-taught architects, that they consider discriminative and overly expensive. In 2009, the cost for the Irish Prescribed Register Examination called ARAE for self-trained architects was €11,500 + €2,000 for lectures, compared to €3,500 in the Netherlands. In 2013, the cost of the ARAE was lowered to €8,500 + €1,250 for lectures.

== Background ==
Although in 2006 the Competition Authority of Ireland had recommended the creation of an Architects Council of Ireland to be independent of the RIAI, the 2007 Act left the RIAI as the registration body, albeit with various safeguards. The Irish legislation states that practitioners with a minimum of seven years of experience but without recognised formal qualification must be assessed through an examination to continue practising in the State. The AAoI considers the examination as inappropriate and exclusionary. The current system allows RIAI members to be automatically registered.

AAoI wants a grandfather clause to be included in the Act for an automatic registration of self-trained professionals who have practised as architects for a minimum of seven years within the Republic of Ireland. European countries such as the UK, France, Belgium, Italy, The Netherlands when first implementing the registration of architects, have included a grandfather clause in their legislation. Legal opinion provided to AAoI advises that such a change would not be in conflict with European Union law.

== Examinations for self-taught architects ==
The ARAE is an examination for practitioners who have gained seven years of experience at any given time. Since 2012 the cost of the ARAE was lowered to €8,500 (+ optional €1,350 for an additional lecture course which is essential to the examination). The position of AAoI is that the ARAE still is unaffordable for the large majority of self-taught architects due to the cost of the examination and the loss of income associated to it. Since 2009, only 30 architects out of many hundreds of potential applicants have successfully completed the ARAE Examination. The RIAI claims that the methodology is specifically designed for practising architects, and that it is suited to those in employment as examinations are arranged in stages over one calendar year. On the contrary, AAoI has explained in many meetings that the ARAE methodology is unsuitable for practicing architects, with many lectures and examinations organised during office hours and spanning on a period of approximately 10 months. An employee would not be able to pass the ARAE without the permission of their employer, without opting out of employment for many weeks. A self-employed would have problems to meet the demands of its clients while preparing and passing the ARAE. He would need to refuse projects and contracts to ensure success to the examination.

The "Technical Assessment" is an examination for self-trained architects with more than 10 years of experience gained in the Republic of Ireland prior to the enforcement of architects' registration. AAoI claims that the fees are inappropriate (€6,500 in 2009, lowered to €4,500 in 2011), and that the RIAI is manipulating the procedure by setting up academic and administrative standards that do not reflect the practice of architecture before the implementation of registration. The RIAI claims that the examinations are based on internationally recognised standards and that 80% of candidates to date have been successful. The AAoI claims that the 80% success rate to the technical assessment is false and that the percentage is nearer to 50%. AAoI declared that less of a dozen of practitioners (out of hundreds of potential applicants) have applied for the Technical Assessment. The RIAI claims that the majority of those on the registration board are not architects and that they are not affiliated to the RIAI. AAoI stated that the sub-boards assessing applicants are made of three RIAI affiliated architects only, and that it would be difficult for any member of the assessment board not affiliated to the RIAI, to challenge the opinion and position of RIAI members on architectural subjects. AAoI members claim that the assessment is set up by their competitors. The RIAI states that the fees for registration are now approved by the government.

== Chronological development ==
=== AAoI actions and related events, 2011 ===
AAoI members lobbied local TDs (Teachta Dála) for addressing newly elected Minister Hogan on the subject of their concerns. Phil Hogan supported the Alliance as a TD and may have required the recent changes in examination fees. In 2012, the position of the Alliance is that the actual examinations are still inappropriate and discriminatory for all self-trained architects established prior to the publication of the Building Control Bill 2005. Some members of the RIAI claim that the examinations are seen by most registered architects as very appropriate to the profession, that they are based on internationally recognised basic standards and discriminate only between those who know the necessary subject matter and those who do not. The RIAI claims that this is important if consumers are to be protected. On this ground AAoI thinks that consumers are not protected by the RIAI. It claims that the RIAI is a limited company acting mainly for the interests of its directors and members. AAoI stated that despite many failures well advertised in Irish newspapers, the RIAI never defended consumers over its members, and that in the contrary, it always protected and reduced its members' liability instead of acting toward consumers' interests. The AAoI claims that the RIAI wrongly uses the subjects of public safety to limit competition, that public safety can be implemented by other means and that limiting the competition for architects to RIAI ltd membership will not serve the public nor protect consumers.

=== AAoI actions and related events, 2012 ===
Members of the new government have decided to review the actual situation in order to find a solution to the conflict. Architects' Alliance of Ireland gained the support of TDs and Senators. Deputy Ciarán Lynch, chairman of the Joint committee on the Environment, Transport, Culture and the Gaeltacht, organised a meeting with the RIAI and the AAoI in order to debate and find solutions for the registration of the so-called "grandfather architects". The issue of the Building Control (amendment) Regulations 2012 was also the subject of the meeting, but it was only rarely addressed during the two-hour debate. During the meeting, AAoI explained how new regulations are preventing its members to provide a full architectural service despite the previous RIAI's assertions stating that "The Act does prevent those not on the Register from using the title architect but it does not limit or control in any way the functions of those providing services in the field of architecture."

The Joint Committee on the Environment agreed to establish an informal working group to request the Minister for Environment, Community and Local Government to take special consideration of the situation of long-standing practitioners in the field of architecture. The group shall work with all the stakeholders to provide a solution, on a strictly once-off basis. The group shall ensure that this process is open, fair and transparent and that the costs involved are reduced to the minimum possible and that any unnecessary costs, administration and red tape are avoided. The Committee agreed the informal working group would be composed of: Deputy Luke Flanagan IND; Deputy Sandra McLellan SF; Deputy Ged Nash LAB; Senator Cáit Keane FG.

=== AAoI actions and related events, 2013 ===
==== Independent review ====
The Minister for the Environment, Community and Local Government, Phil Hogan, T.D., appointed Garrett Fennell, Solicitor, to conduct an independent review of the arrangements for the registration of architects under the Building Control Act 2007. Garrett Fennell is currently serving as chairperson of the Admissions Board established for the Statutory Register.

The terms of reference to the review were as follows:

1. To carry out an independent review of the arrangements generally for the registration of Architects under the Building Control Act 2007

2. To take stock of the overall experience to date in relation to the operation of the registration system with a view to seeing how the system can be further improved.

3. Having regard to the lower than expected number of applications from practically trained architects, to review and make specific recommendation on how the registration of practically trained architects can be better encouraged.

The AAoI and anyone concerned were invited to make a submission for consideration on or before 10 May 2013 by email.

Information submitted are subject to the Freedom of Information Acts and may be placed in the public domain. Administrative assistance in relation to this review was provided by the Department of the Environment, Community and Local Government but Fennell's consideration, treatment and report on the issues raised will be prepared in line with the terms of reference and independently of the department and the registration body.

On 3 September 2013 Mr Garret Fennell, Solicitor, issued his report for the independent review. The report was published on 24 September 2013 with a press notice.

==== Report from The Joint Committee on the Environment ====
On 17 July 2013, The Joint Committee on the Environment issued its report on the title of "architect". The 54-page report includes over 15 formal recommendations in relation to the existing legislation (the Building Control Act 2007) which gave protection to the title of architect. One of the recommendations to the Minister for Environment, Community and Local Government, gives consideration to the inclusion of a typical, self-extinguishing 'grandfather' clause in the Building Control Act 2007 – as is provided in other States' legislation. Another recommendation is for the Technical Assessment Board to advise on the applicability of Irish law and how it facilitates or not the easy transfer of skills across the European Union and the recognition of skills gained outside Ireland and in Ireland.

During the meeting held on 17 July, Michael McCarthy TD, Cathaoirleach of the Oireachtas Joint Committee on Environment, Culture and the Gaeltacht, said: "When a State starts to protect the use of the term 'Architect' and confines it to those on the architects' register, issues can arise relating to the position of existing self-trained practitioners, colloquially termed 'grandfathers'. These issues have been successfully addressed by other Member States in so-called 'grandfather' clauses in legislation."

=== AAoI actions and related events, 2014 ===
In 2014, AAoI launched a website to inform the public on the direction taken by the Irish government to reinforce building control in the Republic of Ireland. Statutory Instrument No.19 of 2014 is a final action from the Irish Government to prevent members of AAoI offering services in Ireland. Despite having always claimed to protect the title "architect" without taking away the rights of AAoI members as professionals practicing architecture in the State, the Minister for the Environment signed a statutory instrument which now deprives professionally trained architects from their rights to design and to oversee the construction of a project. The AAoI strongly opposed the new legislation which was enforced despite strong opposition from other groups and despite The Competition Authority warning which explained that: "As a general principle, new legislation should not impose any unnecessary restrictions on the pool of people eligible to offer a service."

== Critics and oppositions ==
The architectural professional bodies assert that, until the 2007 Act, clients were put at risk from "cowboy" operators and there were no disciplinary controls over individuals outside the professional bodies. The RIAI oppose the proposed amendment of the Building Control Act 2007. Their position is that:" The Building Control Act marks a key shift in widening access to the profession by introducing access to those who have not pursued the standard higher education route. There is a registered admission examination and technical assessment. Up to 1966, entry to the architecture profession could be gained through the RIAI examination system but there has been a general shift towards formal qualifications. The pendulum has swung back to some degree with the shift to an outcomes-based assessment in higher education and away from the input model. The Building Control Act has both models, input from qualifications and output based on the assessment obtained without formal education."

The RIAI opposed John O'Donoghue's private member's bill, the Building Control (Amendment) Bill 2010. A private member's bill can be brought to the Dáil by any single TD and the behest of his supporters. The institute's position is that John O'Donoghue's proposed amendment to the current legislation, if enacted, would be in breach of EU law. The Institute organised political lobbying against John O'Donoghue's private member's bill issuing statements that the proposed amendment damages Irish architects and Irish architecture, that it undermines consumers' protection, and that it disadvantages younger architectural graduates.

== Status ==
The number of individuals and practices joining the association has grown from a dozen to more than a hundred. Some registered architects and many engineers, technicians or surveyors and others are also supporting the cause of AAoI.

The association declares "protecting diversity and promoting choice in Irish Architecture", it also claims "promoting and protecting the provision of architectural services in Ireland". Some members have suggested that the group should develop into a professional representative body.

== See also ==
- Professional requirements for architects
- List of Ireland-related topics
- Autodidactism in architecture
