= De Blacam & Meagher =

Irish architectural firm

de Blacam & Meagher
- Industry: Architectural firm
- Founder: Shane de Blacam; John Meagher
- Headquarters: Dublin, Ireland
- Website: www.deblacamandmeagher.com

de Blacam & Meagher is an Irish architectural firm formed in 1976. The firm is known for its use of natural materials especially wood. In the book Architects Today De Blacam & Meagher and O'Donnell & Tuomey are referred to as "the godfathers of contemporary Irish architecture."

== History ==
After training in University College Dublin and University of Pennsylvania, Shane de Blacam (born 1945) worked for Chamberlin, Powell & Bon on the Barbican Centre in London and for Louis Khan in Philadelphia. John Meagher (1947–2021), studied at Dublin Institute of Technology and for a year at Helsinki School of Architecture in 1971, and also worked early in his career in the United States for Venturi Scott Brown.

De Blacam & Meagher were the principal exhibitors in the Irish Pavilion at the Venice Biennale in 2010. The historian Roy Foster, particularly referring to the firm's work in Dublin wrote in the exhibition catalogue of their commission's "masterly introduction of light, the texture of appropriate materials (brick, hardwood, pre-patinated copper) a use of space and volume at once imaginative and respectful of their surroundings."

== Awards ==
The practice has won a number of awards. The Chapel of Reconciliation at the Catholic shrine at Knock, Ireland (1990) was the first Irish finalist in the Mies van der Rohe award for European architecture. The Beckett Theatre at Trinity College, Dublin won the Architectural Association of Ireland's Downes Bronze Medal in 1993. De Blacam was presented with the Gold Medal of the Royal Institute of the Architects of Ireland (RIAI) in 2003 by the President of Ireland Mary McAleese for a library and information technology extension at Cork Institute of Technology (opened 1996). Another project of the practice, the renovation of the Abbeyleix Library in Leinster won the RIAI Best Conservation/Restoration Project Award in 2009.

In 2021, the practice was awarded the RIAI James Gandon Medal, posthumously in the case of Meagher, in recognition of their contribution to the advancement of architecture.

== Other works ==
- Apartments on the corner of Werburgh Street and Castle Street in Dublin (2003): won the Ireland Housing Medal in 2003
- Esat Headquarters, Esat (2002)
- Houses in Waterloo Lane (2002)
- Wooden Building housing, Temple Bar (2000)
