= Eunan O'Halpin =

Irish historian

Eunan O'Halpin (/ˈjuːnən/ YOO-nən) is Bank of Ireland Professor of Contemporary Irish History at Trinity College Dublin. He was educated at MacDara’s Community College, received his BA and MA from University College Dublin and received a PhD from the University of Cambridge.

O'Halpin specialises in 20th century Irish and British history and politics. Since 2002, he has been a member of the National Archives Advisory Council. He is also a member of the Royal Irish Academy National Committee for History, the Royal Irish Academy National Committee for the Study of International Relations and of the Katherine Kavanagh Trust. He is a grandnephew of Kevin Barry, grandson of Kathleen Barry Moloney and great-grandson of Anti-Treaty Sinn Fein TD for Tipperary South, P. J. Moloney.

In 2013, O'Halpin presented In the Name of the Republic, which was shown on TV3.

== Published works ==
- The Decline of the Union: British government in Ireland 1892-1920, Gill and Macmillan, 1987.
- Head of the Civil Service: A study of Sir Warren Fisher, Routledge, 1989.
- Defending Ireland: The Irish state and its enemies since 1922, Oxford University Press, 1999.
- Spying on Ireland: British intelligence and Irish neutrality, Oxford University Press, 2008.
- Dead of the Irish Revolution, Yale University Press, 2020 - with Daithi O Corrain.
- Kevin Barry: The short life of an Irish rebel, Merrion Press, 2020.
