= Seán Ó Laoire =

Irish architect and urban designer (1946–2026)

- Born: 13 July 1946; Dublin, Ireland
- Died: 7 April 2026 (aged 79); Dublin, Ireland
- Education: University College Dublin; University of California, Los Angeles
- Occupation: Architect
- Awards: RIAI Triennial Gold Medal
- Practice: Murray Ó Laoire Architects (1979–2010); MOLA Architecture (2010–2026)
- Projects: Dublin Docklands Masterplan; Green Building, Temple Bar; Expo 2000 Ireland pavilion Titanic Quarter, Belfast; Cork School of Music

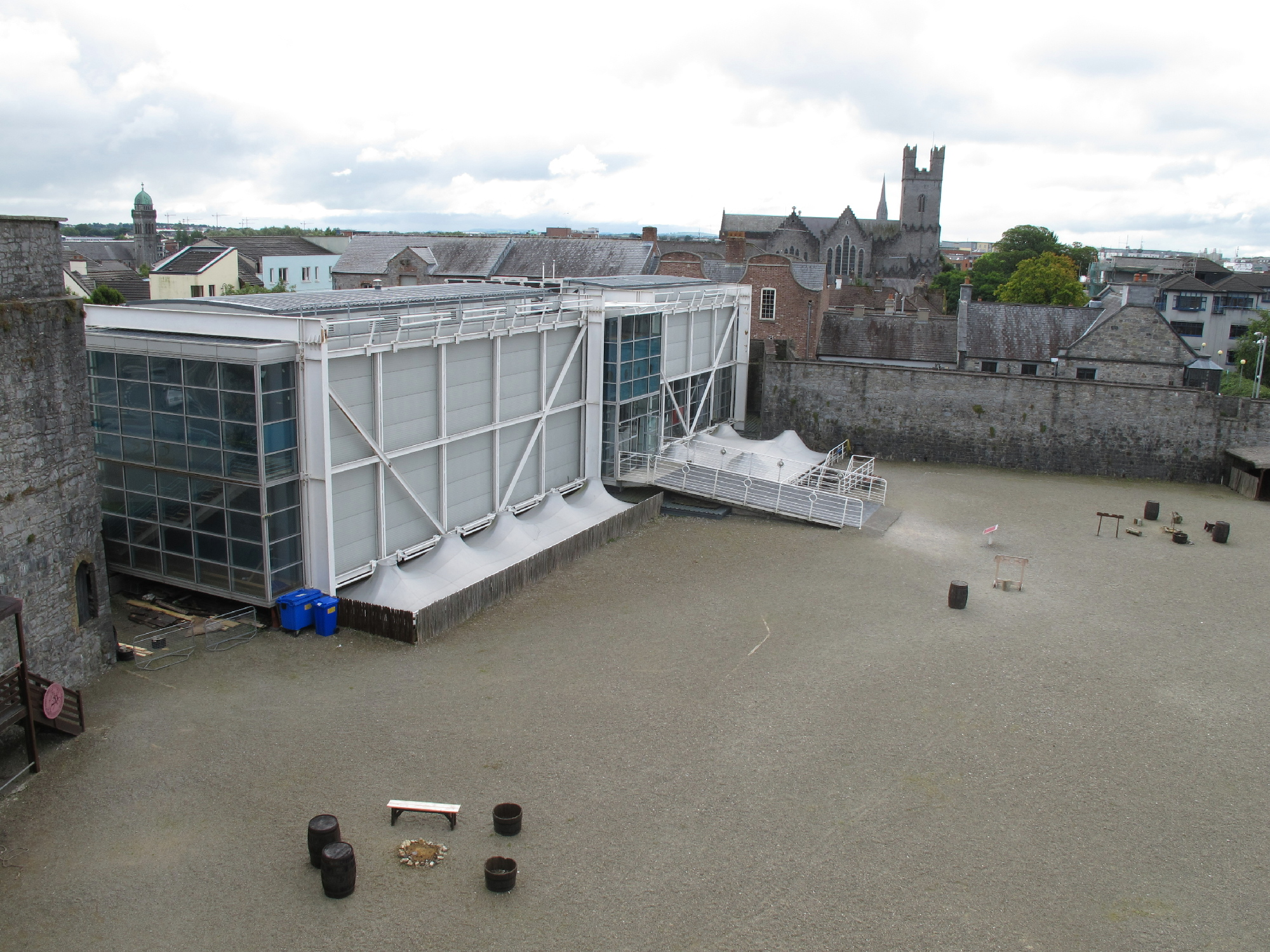
Visitor centre at King John's Castle, Limerick

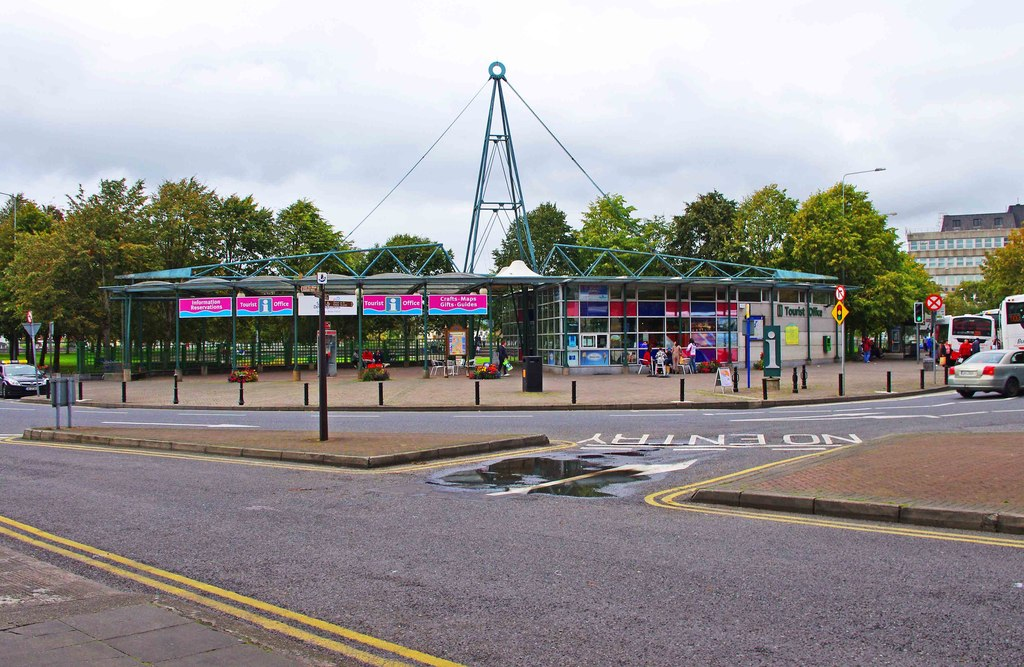
Limerick Tourist Information Office, Arthurs Quay, Limerick

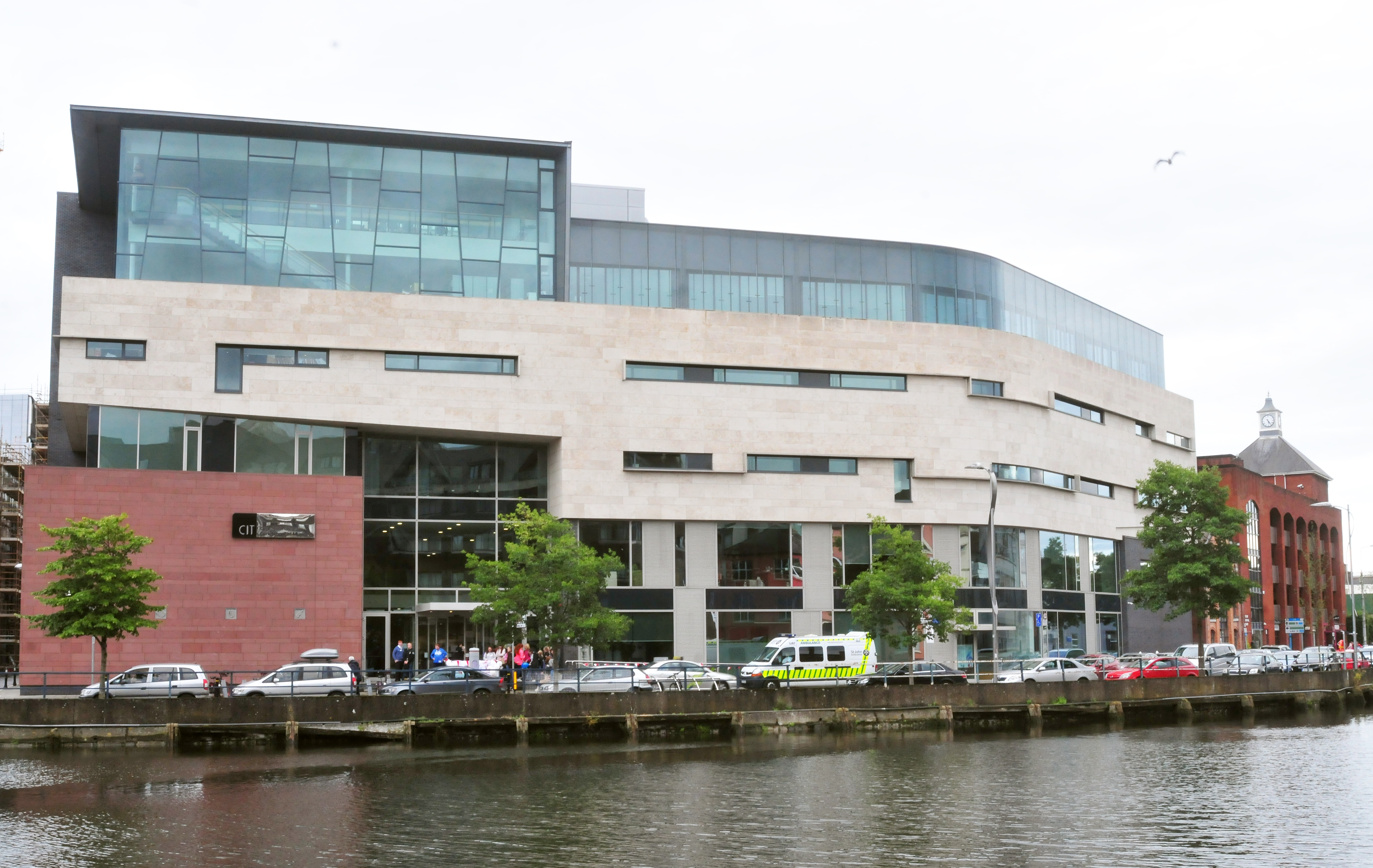
Cork School of Music

Seán Ó Laoire (13 July 1946 – 7 April 2026) was an Irish architect and urban designer. He studied architecture at University College Dublin, graduating in 1970, and gained a master's degree in urban design at the University of California, Los Angeles. In 1979, he established Murray Ó Laoire Architects in Limerick with fellow architect Hugh Murray.

Ó Laoire was elected a Fellow of the Royal Institute of the Architects of Ireland (RIAI) in 1993, became vice-president of the Institute in 1995 and was elected its president in 2008.

== Career ==
=== Studies and early career ===
While studying architecture at UCD, Ó Laoire was one of the leaders of a student revolt, along with future government minister Ruairí Quinn and environmentalist Duncan Stewart, that ultimately removed the head of the school, Desmond FitzGerald, over concerns that the school would lose its recognition by the Royal Institute of British Architects.

Following his graduation, Ó Laoire worked in Italy, Britain and the United States before returning to Ireland. From 1976 to 1979 he lectured at the Dublin Institute of Technology.

=== Murray Ó Laoire Architects ===
In 1979, he and fellow UCD graduate, Hugh Murray, established Murray Ó Laoire Architects in Limerick, making a name for its urban regeneration projects including an interpretative centre at King John’s Castle and the renewal of Arthur’s Quay Park which went on to win the RIAI Triennial Gold Medal in 1995. In 1982, Ó Laoire established a Dublin office of the practice and became involved in the regeneration of the Dublin Docklands. He led the development of the masterplan framework for Dublin's International Financial Services Centre competition in 1985 and went on to develop the Bord Gáis Dockland Framework at Grand Canal Dock, and Dublin Docklands Master Plans in 1997 and 2008. He also developed masterplans for the Titanic Quarter, Belfast and for the Ceannt Station Quarter, Galway.

The practice won over 70 national and international awards and competitions including the aforementioned RIAI Triennial Gold Medal Award, five Irish Planning Institute National Planning Awards, fourteen RIAI Awards, a Silver Diploma in the Moscow International Festival 'Zodchestvo' in 2005 and the winning design in a competition for the Irish Pavilion at Expo 2000 in Hanover.

By 2007, Murray Ó Laoire Architects was the largest architectural practice in Ireland and, at its peak, employed 280 people with offices in Dublin, Limerick and Cork as well as in Aachen, Moscow, and Bratislava. In March 2010, the company went into liquidation with the loss of 127 jobs, a victim of the global economic crash. By then it also had offices in Libya, Barbados and the United Arab Emirates.

=== RIAI President ===
It was during Ó Laoire's tenure as president of the RIAI that legislation was passed to formally recognise the title of "Architect" as a protected professional title. He described it as "the culmination of a long and hard-fought battle to have professional standards set and so protect the public".

=== Later career ===
In 2010, Ó Laoire established a new practice, MOLA Architecture, with fellow directors from Murray Ó Laoire Architects.

Ó Laoire was a regular contributor to the Irish Arts Review and other publications. He served on the board of the National College of Art and Design and the National Sculpture Factory in Cork, and contributed to many cultural institutions including the Belltable Arts Centre in Limerick and Triskel Arts Centre in Cork. He was also a founding member of the Academy of Urbanism.

== Personal life and death ==
Ó Laoire was born on 13 July 1946. He grew up near Glasnevin in north Dublin, the second oldest of 10 children. Ó Laoire attended school at Coláiste Mhuire, Parnell Square. His mother was from Kerry, and his father, Dónal Ó Laoire, a teacher at St. Vincent's C.B.S., Glasnevin, was born in New York and grew up in Dublin.

Ó Laoire died of brain cancer at Our Lady's Hospice in Dublin, on 7 April 2026. He was 79.
