= Allan Hope =

Australian rules footballer, born 1903

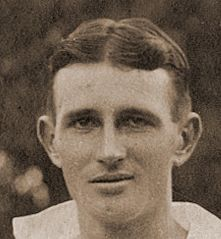

Personal information
- Full name: Allan Hope
- Born: 19 February 1903
- Died: 2 August 1984 (aged 81)
- Original team: Brighton Vale
- Position: Centre / forward

Playing career^{1}
Years	Club	Games (Goals)
1928	Melbourne	4 (7)
- ^{1} Playing statistics correct to the end of 1928.

Allan Hope (19 February 1903 – 2 August 1984) was an Australian rules footballer who played for the Melbourne Football Club in the Victorian Football League (VFL).
