= Michael Scott (architect) =

Irish architect (1905–89)

- Born: 24 June 1905; Drogheda, Ireland
- Died: January 24, 1989 (aged 83); Dublin, Ireland
- Education: Belvedere College
- Occupation: Architect
- Buildings: Busáras

Michael Scott (24 June 1905 – 24 January 1989) was an Irish architect whose buildings included the Busáras building in Dublin, Cork Opera House, the Abbey Theatre and both Tullamore and Portlaoise Hospitals.

== Early life and education ==
He was born John Michael Scott in Drogheda in 1905. His family originated in the province of Munster. His father, William Scott, was a school inspector from Blackwater near Sneem on the Iveragh Peninsula in County Kerry. His mother, Hilda Louise Scott (née Daly) was from Cork city. She drowned in the River Dodder in a suspected suicide when Michael was 15 years old. He had a brother William Joseph, and two sisters Mary Elizabeth and Hilda.

The family lived in Navan, County Meath for a time before moving to Dublin where they are recorded at Leinster Road West, Rathmines in the 1926 Irish Free State census.

Michael was educated at Belvedere College, Dublin. There he first demonstrated his skills in painting and acting. Initially, he wanted to pursue a career as a painter but his father pointed out that it might make more financial sense to become an architect.

== Career ==
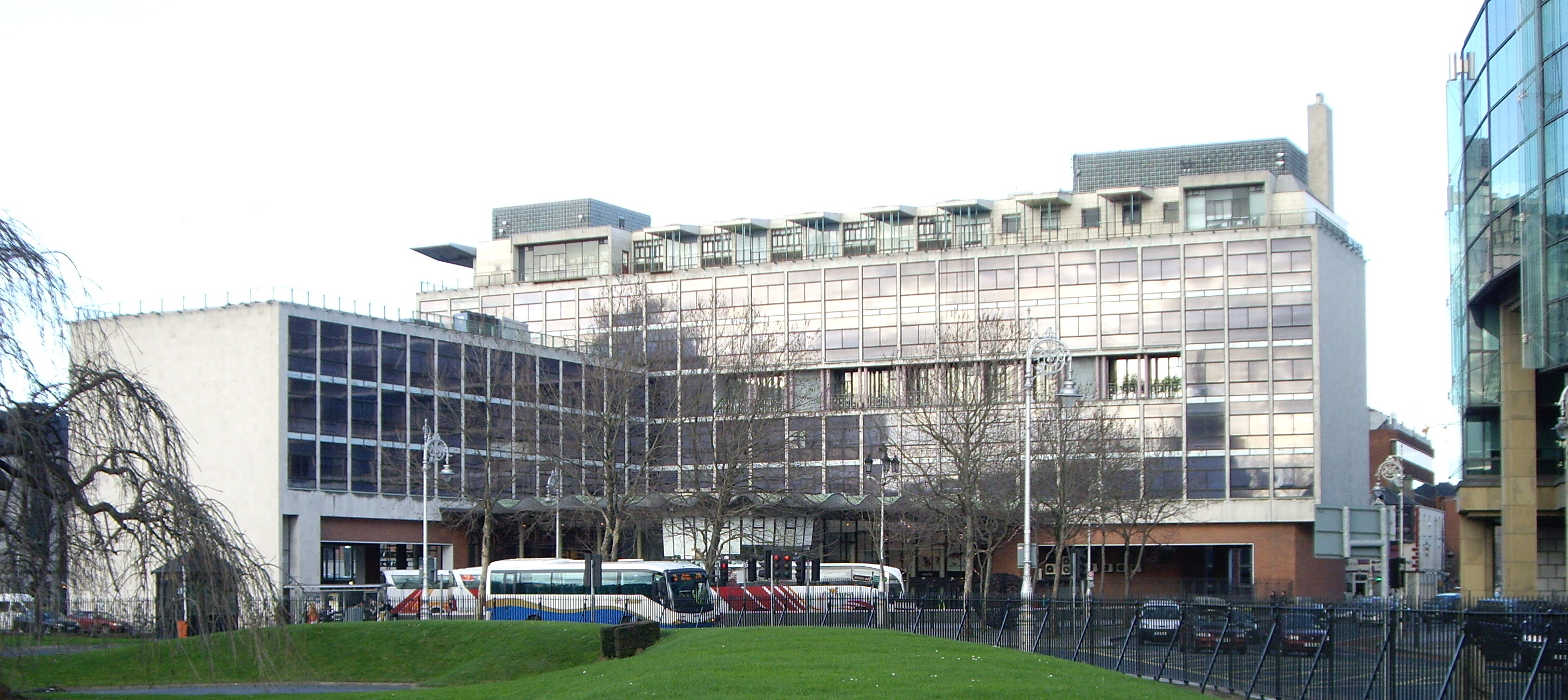
Busáras

Scott became an apprentice for the sum of £375 per annum to the Dublin architectural firm Jones and Kelly. He remained there from 1923 until 1926, where he studied under Alfred E. Jones. In the evenings after work, he also attended the Metropolitan School of Art and the Abbey School of Acting, and appeared in many plays there until 1927, including the first productions of Seán O'Casey's (1884–1964) Juno and the Paycock and The Plough and the Stars. On completing his pupilage he became an assistant to Charles James Dunlop and then had a brief spell as an assistant architect in the Office of Public Works.

In 1931 he partnered with Norman D. Good to form Scott and Good, and they opened an office in Dublin. Scott and Good's designed the hospital at Tullamore (1934–37) and Portlaoise General Hospital (1935). Between 1937 and 1938, Scott was the President of the Architectural Association of Ireland (AAI). He founded his company, Michael Scott Architects, in 1938. That same year he also designed his house Geragh, at Sandycove, County Dublin.

Scott's most important pre-war commission was the Irish Pavilion for the 1939 New York World's Fair in 1938. Scott produced a shamrock-shaped building constructed in steel, concrete, and glass. It was selected by an international jury as the best building in the show. As a result, Scott was presented with a silver medal for distinguished services and given honorary citizenship of the city of New York by then Mayor Fiorello La Guardia. Other better-known architects who designed national pavilions for this World Fair included Alvar Aalto of Finland and Oscar Niemeyer (born 1907) of Brazil.

Scott had three major commissions from the Córas Iompair Éireann CIÉ, the Inchicore Chassis Works, the Donnybrook Bus Garage (1952) and, most famously, the Dublin Central Bus Station, to be known as Áras Mhic Dhiarmada or Busáras. Though initially controversial, Busáras was to win Scott the Royal Institute of Architects of Ireland Triennial Gold Medal for Architecture.

Scott was the founder of Rosc and the chairman of the board for many years. Rosc '67 was a large, first of its kind, Irish art exhibition which showed historic treasures from Irish history alongside hundreds of contemporary artworks. The Rosc series of exhibitions continued for 21 years.

Later, Ronnie Tallon and Robin Walker became partners, and the firm was renamed Scott Tallon Walker in 1975, shortly after the firm won the RIBA Royal Gold Medal.

== Personal life ==
Scott was married to Patricia (Patty) Nixon for over 40 years until her death in 1976. They had four sons and one daughter. He died on 24 January 1989 at his home in Sandycove, and was buried in Tahilla churchyard, near Sneem.

== Works ==
- 1936-42 Tullamore General Hospital, County Offaly
- 1933-36 Portlaoise General Hospital, County Laois
- 1938–39 Irish Pavilion, New York World's Fair, New York
- 1945–53 Busáras, Store Street, Dublin
- 1946-48 O'Donoghue (Donohoe) Public house and residence, Edenderry, County Offaly
- 1946–48 Chassis factory, Inchicore, Dublin
- 1946–51 Bus garage at Donnybrook, Dublin
- 1969 Wesley College, Dublin (Current Campus)
- Conway House, East Wall Road, Dublin 3 one-piece staircase
