= Royal Institute of the Architects of Ireland =

Professional organisation

- Abbreviation: RIAI
- Formation: 1839
- Type: Professional body
- Legal status: Private company limited by guarantee and registered charity
- Purpose: Competent authority for the architectural profession in Ireland and the Register of Architects
- Headquarters: 8 Merrion Square, Dublin 2, Ireland.
- Location: Ireland
- Region served: Ireland
- Website: www.RIAI.ie

The Royal Institute of the Architects of Ireland (RIAI) (Irish: Institiúid Ríoga Ailtirí na hÉireann) founded in 1839, is the "competent authority for architects and professional body for Architecture in Ireland."

The RIAI's purpose is "to uphold the highest standards in architecture and to provide impartial and authoritative advice and information in issues affecting architects, the built environment and society." The RIAI's primary roles are in the areas of: Protecting the consumer; Promoting architecture; Supporting architects and architectural technologists; and Regulating architects. The institute is governed by a 26-member council.

The RIAI acts as the registration body for architects in Ireland. The title "Architect" is protected by Section 18 of the Building Control Act 2007 and can only be used by RIAI-registered architects.

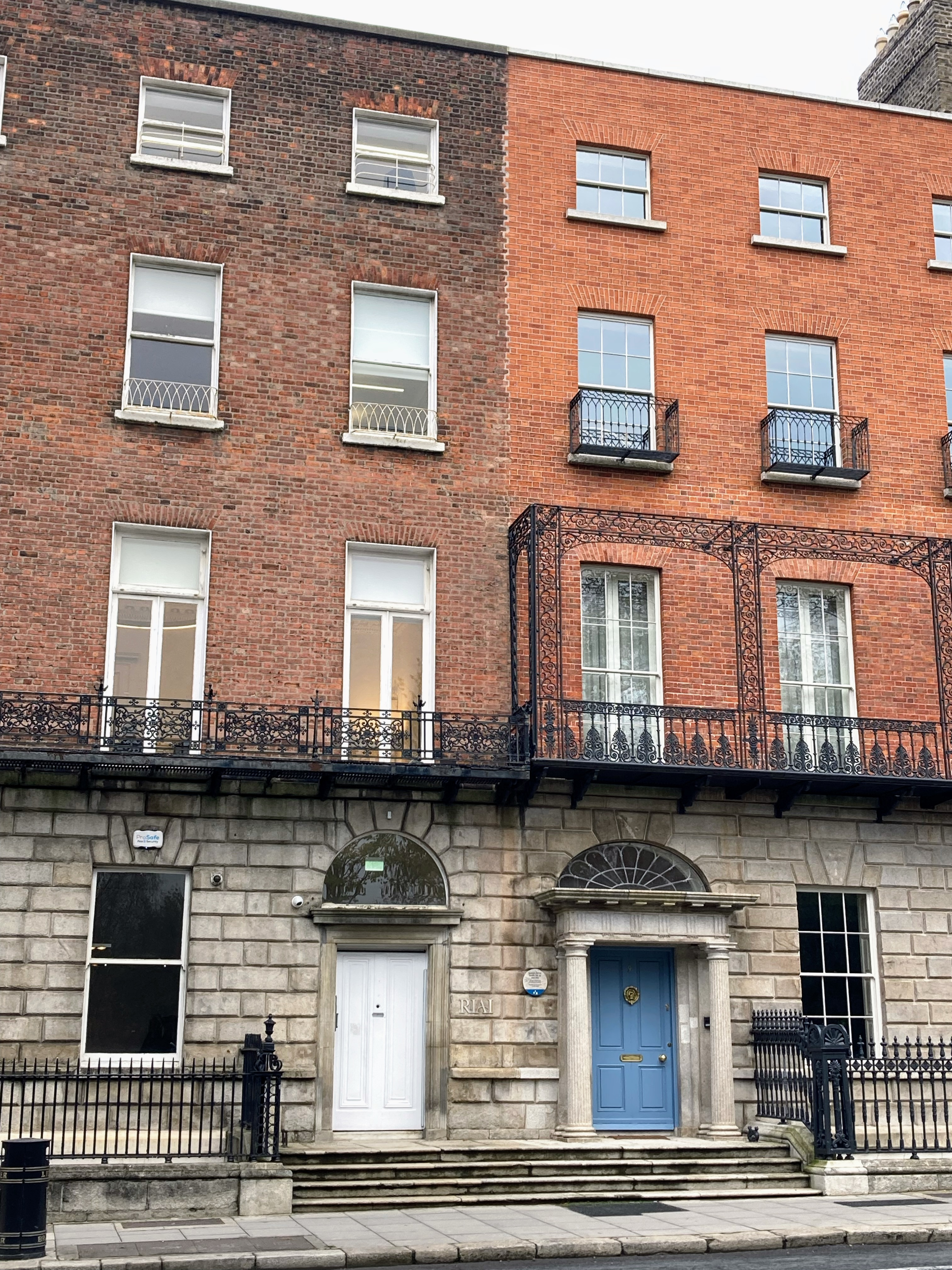
RIAI offices at 8 Merrion Square, Dublin

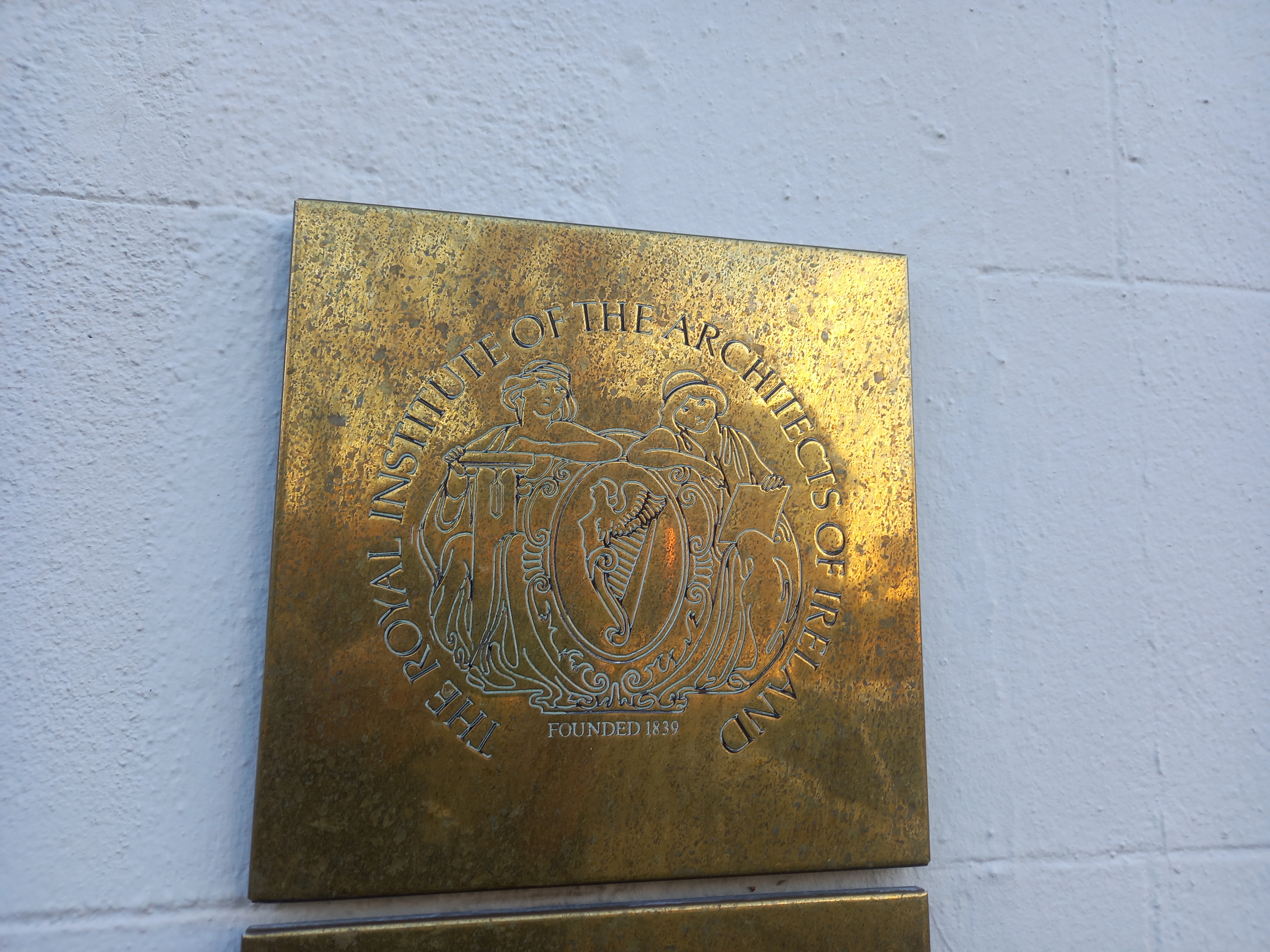
Brass plaque at RIAI headquarters

== Awards ==
In addition to providing a range of services to the public, to members and to the State, the RIAI operates annual design awards, and several individual awards as follows:

- The RIAI Triennial Gold Medal is awarded every three years to the best building completed in a given three-year period.
- The RIAI Silver Medal for Housing is a biennial award made to encourage excellence of design in housing. The inaugural winner was Dermot P. Smyth for a County Council Housing Scheme at Stepaside, Dublin in 1958.
- The RIAI Silver Medal for Conservation and Restoration is awarded to an RIAI Architect or architectural practice for projects of exceptional merit completed within a specified three-year period. The inaugural winner was Niall Montgomery in 1976 for the Kilkenny Design Workshops.
- The RIAI Gandon Medal is the Institute's highest individual award and is awarded every two years for 'lifetime achievement' in architecture. The inaugural award was made to Dr. Ronald Tallon of Scott Tallon Walker on 23 November 2010 by Minister for Tourism, Culture and Sport, Mary Hanafin, TD. Other notable recipients include Kevin Roche, Yvonne Farrell and Shelley McNamara of Grafton Architects, Shane De Blacam and John Meagher (Note: The Gandon Medal was awarded posthumously in the case of Meagher.) of De Blacam & Meagher, and Sheila O'Donnell and John Tuomey of O'Donnell & Tuomey.
- The RIAI Student Excellence award is an annual student competition open to students from all the recognised programmes of Architecture in Ireland and RIAI-accredited programmes in Architectural Technology. It was first awarded in 1935. Notable recipients include Sam Stephenson (1956) and Deirdre O'Connor (1972).
- The Deirdre O'Connor Medal is awarded to the candidate with the best results in the RIAI Examination in Professional Practice.

== Membership ==
The RIAI operates several grades of membership relating to architects and architectural technologists: Fellowship, Membership, Architectural Technologist membership, Architectural Graduate membership and Student membership. Members of the first three ranks are entitled to use the affixes FRIAI (Fellows), MRIAI(Members) and RIAI Arch.Tech. (Architectural Technologist members). Honorary Fellows and Members use Hon. before their affix. There is no entitlement to an affix for graduate members or student members.

Fellowship is awarded by the RIAI Council to existing Members according to specific rules. Honorary Fellowship is awarded to persons not in architectural practice in Ireland for their distinguished service to architecture or the allied arts and sciences. Notable recipients include David Chipperfield, John Cole, Odile Decq, Kenneth Frampton, Jan Gehl, Piers Gough, Edward Jones, Edward McParland, Rafael Moneo, Roger Stalley and John Worthington.

Membership is the standard level for architects in the Republic of Ireland. It is open to those who have demonstrated competence to the level of the RIAI Standard of Knowledge Skill and Competence for Professional Practice as an architect. For those who have been deemed eligible for professional membership but who are not eligible to benefit from 'automatic' recognition under EU regulations the MRIAI(IRL) affix is used instead of MRIAI.

Architectural Technologist membership is open to Architectural Technologists with an accredited qualification in architectural technology and at least two years of approved post-graduate practical experience.

Architectural Graduate membership is open to all graduates of recognised five-year architecture programmes.

Student membership is open to students of architecture and architectural technology currently enrolled in, or on a year out from, courses that are currently accredited by the RIAI.

In addition to individual membership, Practice Membership is open to all current Registered Members who have at least 51% controlling interest in the Practice.

== Presidents ==
Presidents of the RIAI are elected by RIAI members and, since 1938, serve a two-year term. In 1994, Joan O'Connor became the first woman to be elected president.

- 1839 Lord Fitzgerald and Vesey
- 1843 Viscount Powerscourt
- 1844 Marquess of Clanricarde
- 1863 Sir Charles Lanyon
- 1868 Sir Thomas Deane
- 1870 James Higgins Owen
- 1875 John McCurdy
- 1886 William Henry Lynn
- 1889 Sir Thomas Drew
- 1902 George C. Ashlin
- 1905 William Mansfield Mitchell
- 1908 Frederick Batchelor
- 1911 Albert E. Murray
- 1914 Richard Caulfield Orpen
- 1917 W. Kaye Parry
- 1920 Lucius O’Callaghan
- 1923 George P. Sheridan
- 1926 James Henry Webb
- 1929 Frederick G. Hicks
- 1932 George F. Beckett
- 1935 Harry Allberry
- 1938 John J. Robinson
- 1940 W. H. Howard Cooke
- 1942 Louis F. Giron
- 1944 Vincent Kelly
- 1946 Stephen S. Kelly
- 1948 Frank McArdle
- 1950 J. M. Fairweather
- 1952 Eoghan D. G. Buckley
- 1954 Thomas F. Inglis
- 1956 Gerald McNicholl
- 1958 Thomas P. Kennedy
- 1960 Harry S. Robson
- 1962 Luan P. Cuffe
- 1964 Piaras Mac Cionnaith
- 1966 Wilfrid Cantwell
- 1968 Robin Walker
- 1970 William A Maguire
- 1972 Kevin Fox
- 1974 Padraig Murray
- 1976 Niall Montgomery
- 1978 Oscar Richardson
- 1980 John O'Reilly
- 1982 Martin D. Burke
- 1984 Piaras Beaumont
- 1986 Michael Collins
- 1988 Arthur Gibney
- 1990 Brian O'Connell
- 1992 Peter Hanna
- 1994 Joan O'Connor
- 1996 David Keane
- 1998 Eoin Ó Cofaigh
- 2000 Arthur Hickey
- 2002 Toal Ó Muiré
- 2004 Tony Reddy
- 2006 James Pike
- 2008 Seán Ó Laoire
- 2010 Paul Keogh
- 2012 Michelle Fagan
- 2014 Robin Mandal
- 2016 Carole Pollard
- 2018 David Browne
- 2020 Ciarán O'Connor
- 2022 Charlotte Sheridan
- 2024 Séan Mahon
- 2026 Fionnuala May

== Criticism ==
In 2010 the Broadcasting Authority of Ireland upheld a complaint by the Architects' Alliance of Ireland against a radio advertisement which suggested that people providing architectural services who are not registered with the RIAI, are not competent to provide those services. The Institute issued an apology on RTÉ and the advertising campaign was banned.

In 2011 the Competition Authority in Ireland expressed concerns about what was perceived to be unjustified restrictions on competition within the architectural profession. At the same time, the Authority expressed apprehension about proposed regulatory changes outlined in the Building Control Bill 2005, particularly regarding the level of influence granted to the Royal Institute of the Architects of Ireland (RIAI) in determining architectural qualifications. Specifically, the Authority feared that the proposed changes could create conflicts of interest, as the RIAI represented the majority of architects in Ireland while also having control over the rules designed to safeguard the public interest. In response to these concerns, the RIAI removed regulations that unnecessarily restricted advertising by architects in May 2004 and stopped publishing percentage fees in draft contracts in order to address the Authority's apprehensions. The aim of these actions were said to promote transparency and fairness within the profession while addressing the Competition Authority's concerns about undue influence and potential conflicts of interest.

== See also ==
- Architects' Alliance of Ireland
- Architectural Association of Ireland
- Architecture of Ireland
- Irish Architectural Archive
- Professional requirements for architects
