= Architectural Association of Ireland =

- Formation: 1896
- Location: Ireland
- Fields: Architecture in Ireland
- Website: Architecturalassociation.ie

The Architectural Association of Ireland is an organisation dedicated to architecture in Ireland. It is not a professional accredited organisation but is open to all. Its activities include the organisation of a public lecture series, an annual architectural awards scheme, site visits, and exhibitions. It also produces publications, including the Building Material journal.

== Foundation ==
The AAI was founded in 1896 "to promote and afford facilities for the study of architecture and the allied sciences and arts, and to provide a medium of friendly communication between members and others interested in the progress of architecture".

== Membership ==
Membership in the AAI is open to architects, architecture students, and anyone interested in the progress of architectural culture.

== See also ==
- Royal Institute of the Architects of Ireland
