= Architecture of Ireland =

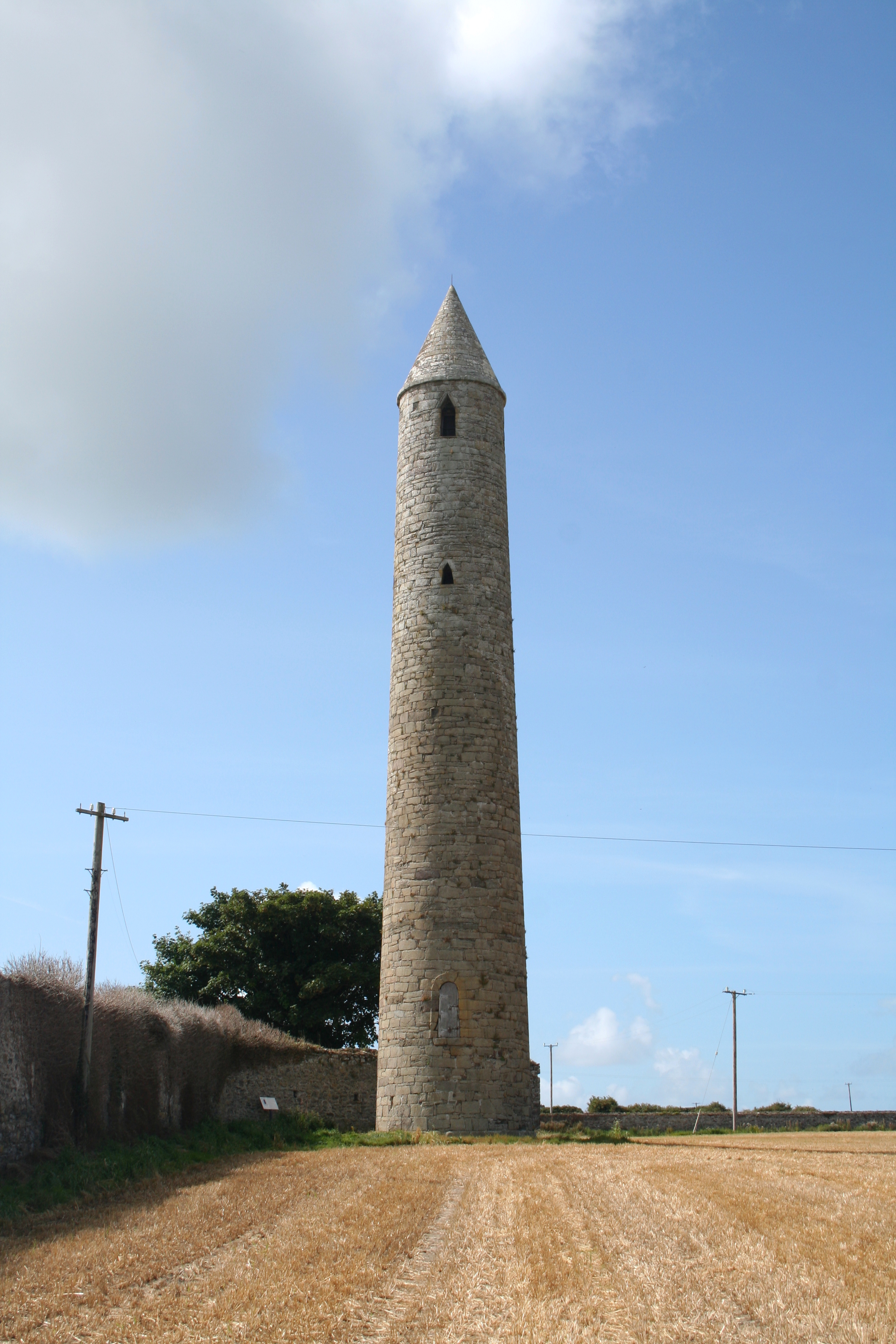
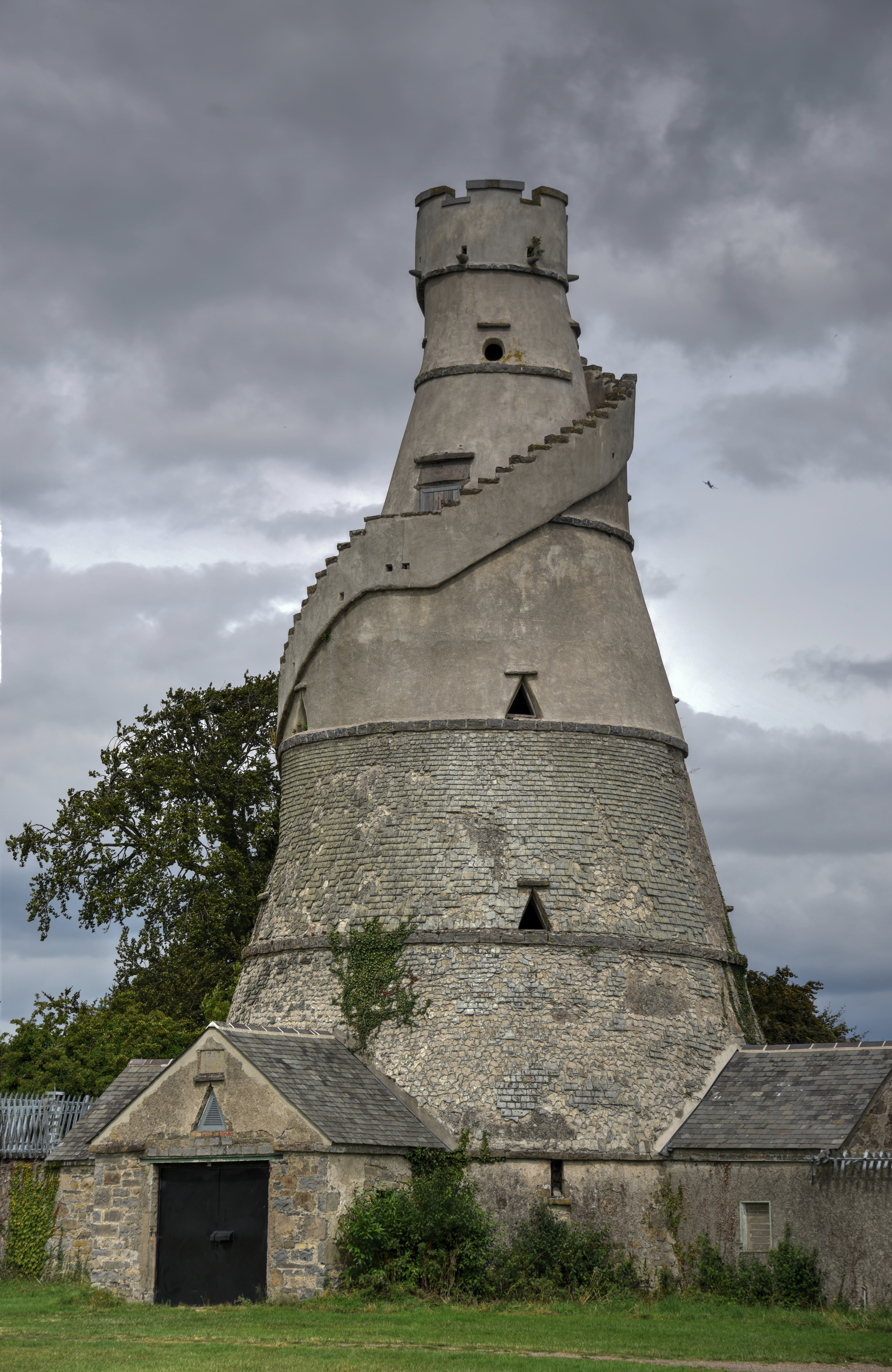
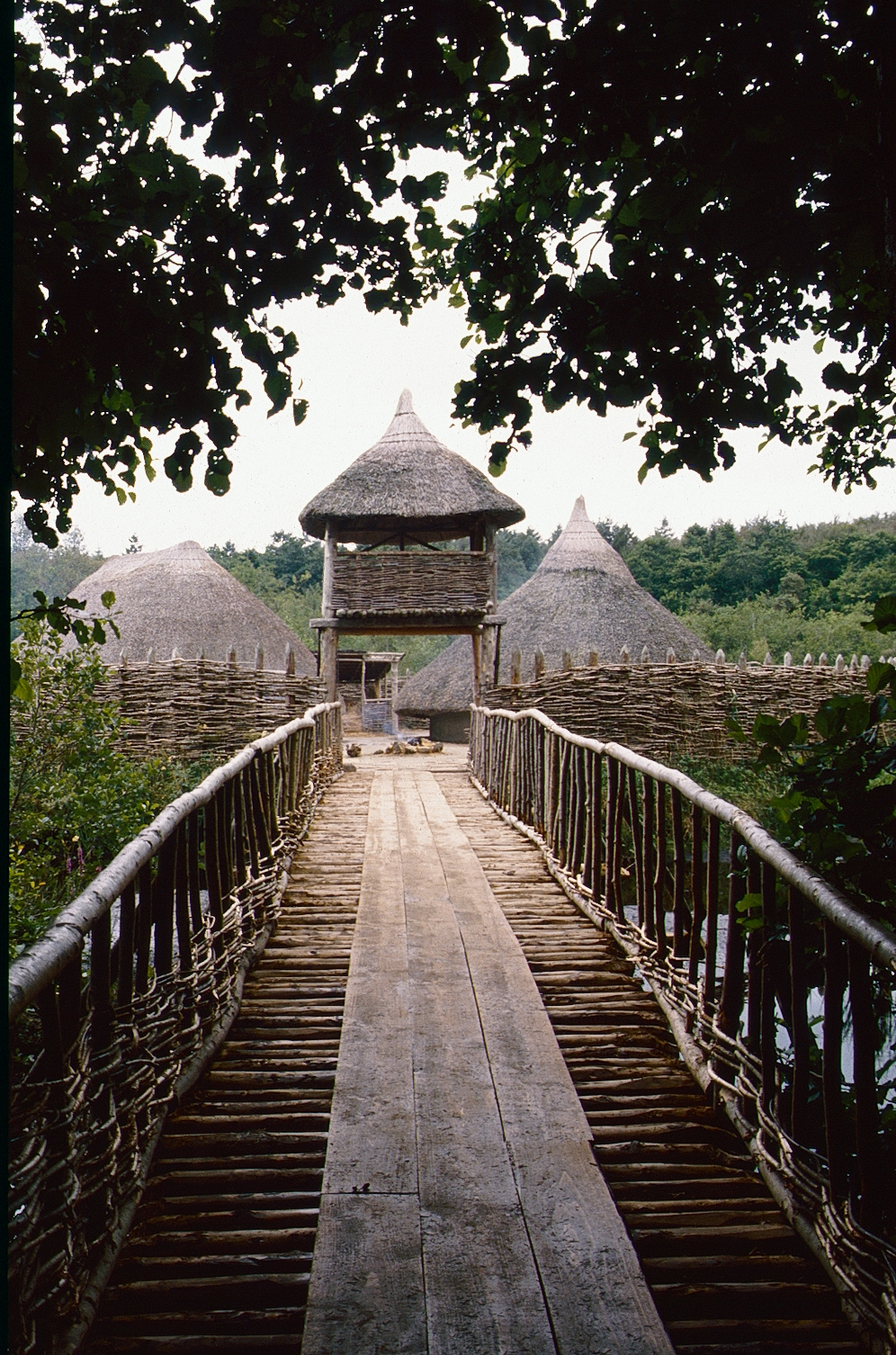
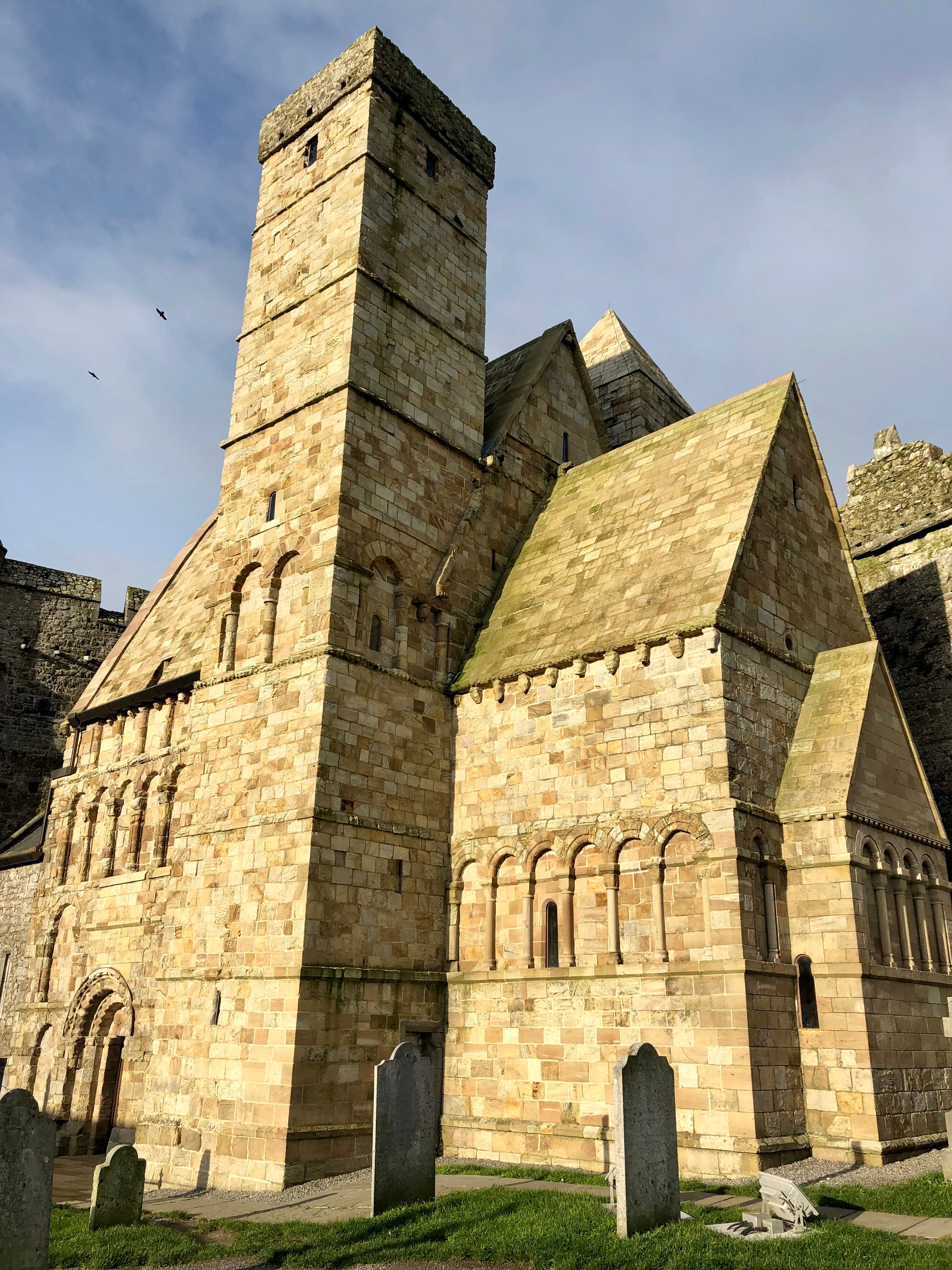
From left to right: the Ratoo Round Tower (County Kerry), the Wonderful Barn (County Kildare), the Craggaunowen Crannog (County Clare) and Cormac’s Chapel at the Rock of Cashel (County Tipperary)

The architecture of Ireland is one of the most visible features in the Irish countryside – with remains from all eras since the Stone Age abounding. Ireland is famous for its ruined and intact Norman and Anglo-Irish castles, small whitewashed thatched cottages and Georgian urban buildings. What are unaccountably somewhat less famous are the still complete Palladian and Rococo country houses which can be favourably compared to anything similar in northern Europe, and the country's many Gothic and neo-Gothic cathedrals and buildings.

Despite the oft-times significant British and wider European influence, the fashion and trends of architecture have been adapted to suit the peculiarities of the particular location. Variations of stone (particularly limestone, granite and sandstone), lime mortar, wood, sod, cob and straw are prevalent materials in traditional Irish architecture.

== Pre-Christian Ireland ==
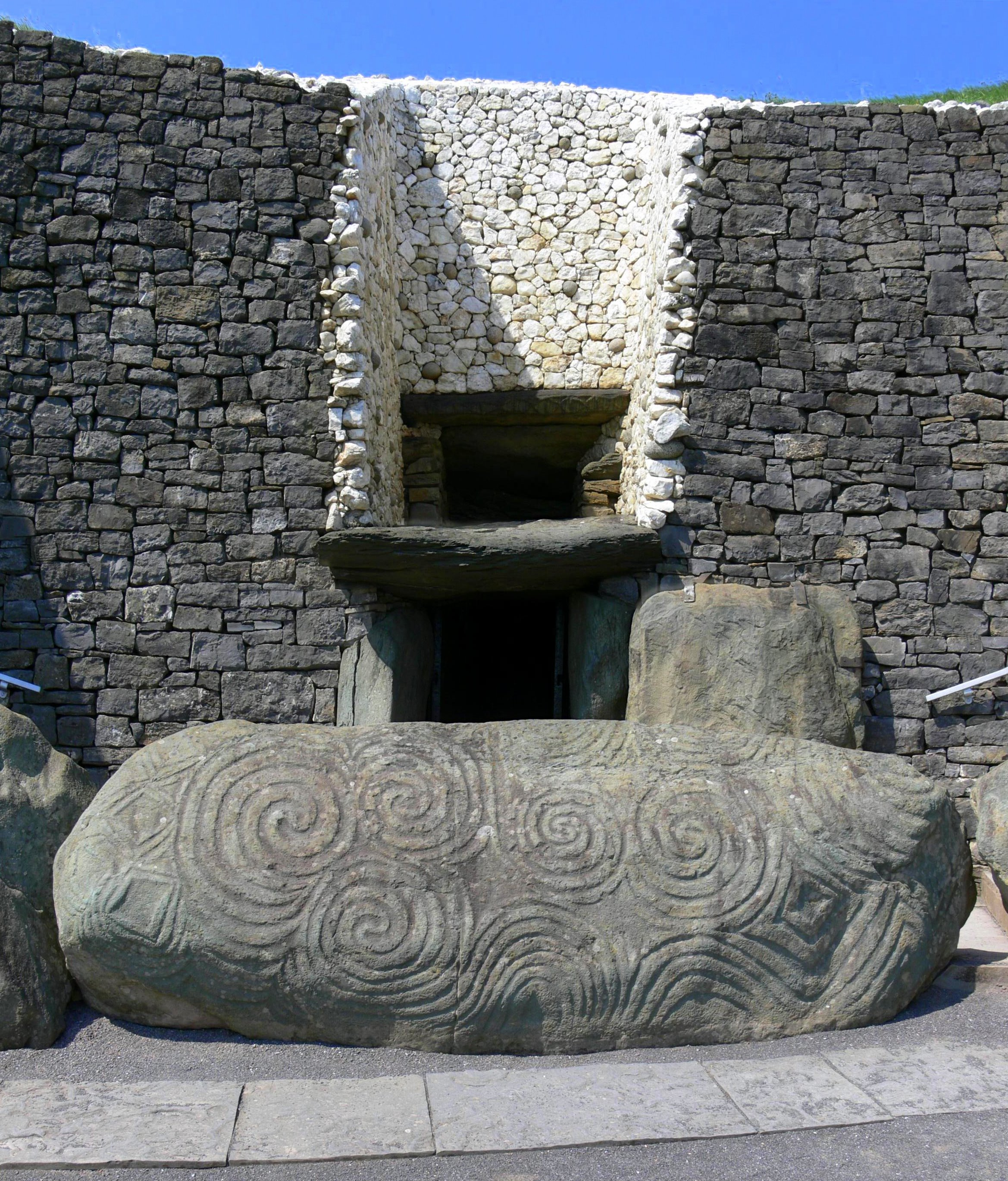
Entrance to Newgrange Tomb, the most imposing monument in the Brú na Bóinne complex in County Meath

Grange stone circle is the largest such megalithic construction in Ireland. The earliest date from the Neolithic or late Stone Age. Megalithic tombs are relatively common, with court tombs being the oldest, some dating back to around 3500 BC. Such tombs consisted of a long chamber, with a large open area (or court) at the entrance. This "court" was generally marked out with standing stones, with the rest of the structure also built in stone.

Passage tombs consisted of a central burial chamber, with a long passageway to the entrance. Again, standing stones were often used for the walls, with slabs of stone over the roof. Newgrange in particular is more interesting in that the inner chamber uses corbelling to span the roof. The chamber and passageway were usually contained in an earthen mound, with the chamber at the centre (Newgrange is again notable in having exterior stonework on the mound). Other notable passage graves are Knowth and Dowth, also in the Boyne Valley near Drogheda.

From some time beginning around the Iron Age, Ireland has thousands of ring forts, or "raths". These consist of an earthen embankment around a central enclosure, sometimes sited on a raised mound. In some cases, a souterrain (tunnel) forms part of the structure. These were built also as hill forts depending on the local terrain, or indeed promontory forts. Dún Aengus on the Aran Islands one of the best examples of these forts, which may have been occupied at various times, even in the mediaeval era.

== Early Christian Ireland ==
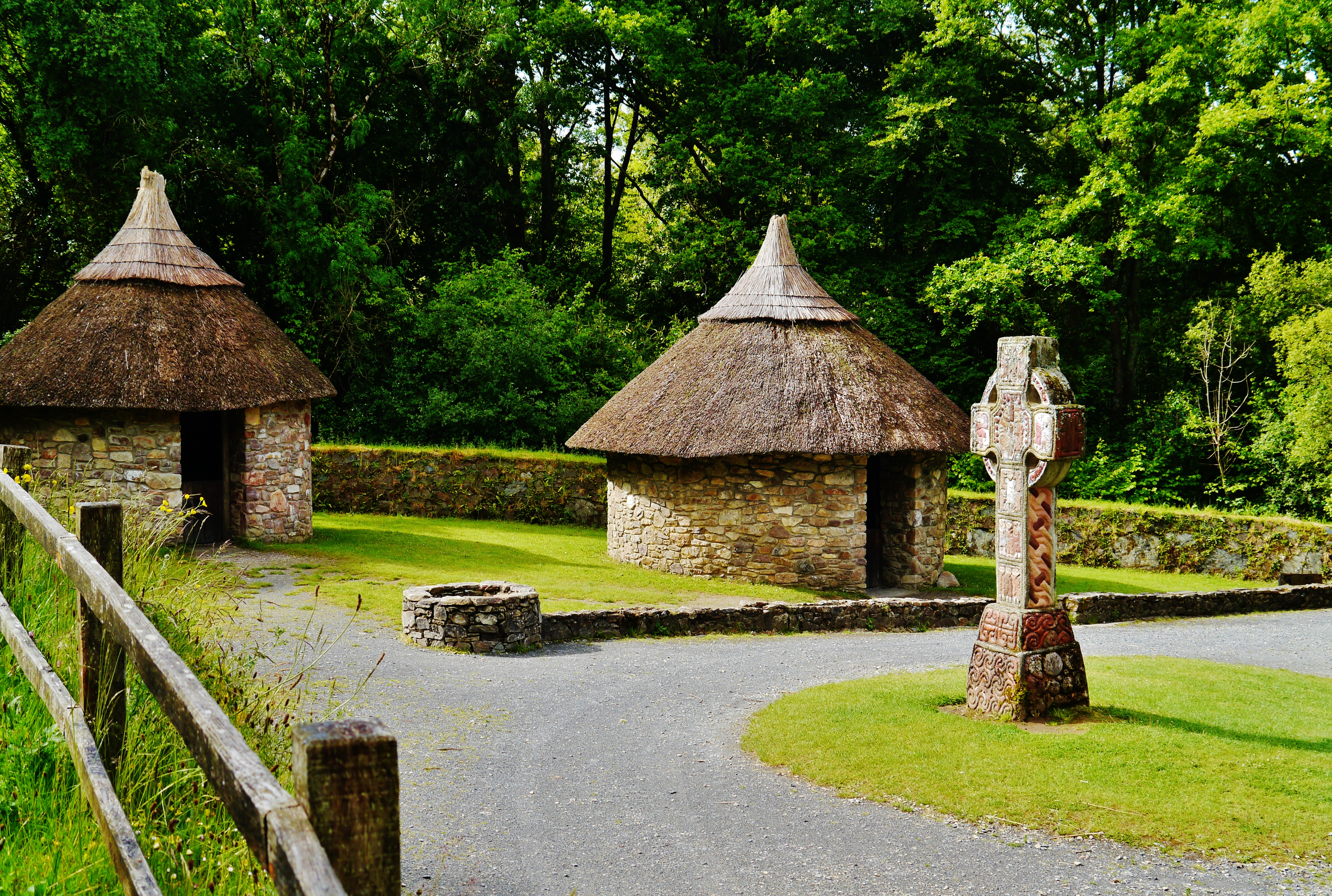
Recreation of an early Christian Monastery at the Irish National Heritage Park

One feature not usually found outside Ireland is the round tower, such as that at Clonmacnoise in County Offaly or the one on Devenish Island near Enniskillen in County Fermanagh. These were usually built within the monasteries that sprang up all over the island, as the country became the "land of saints and scholars". They were possibly defensive in nature, serving as lookout posts and a place of refuge during an attack (the door to such structures was usually quite high off the ground). Viking raids on Ireland's shores and monasteries were relatively common. St. Cronan's Church in Tuamgraney, County Clare, a pre-Romanesque church which dates from the 10th century, is the oldest church in continuous use in both Ireland and Great Britain.

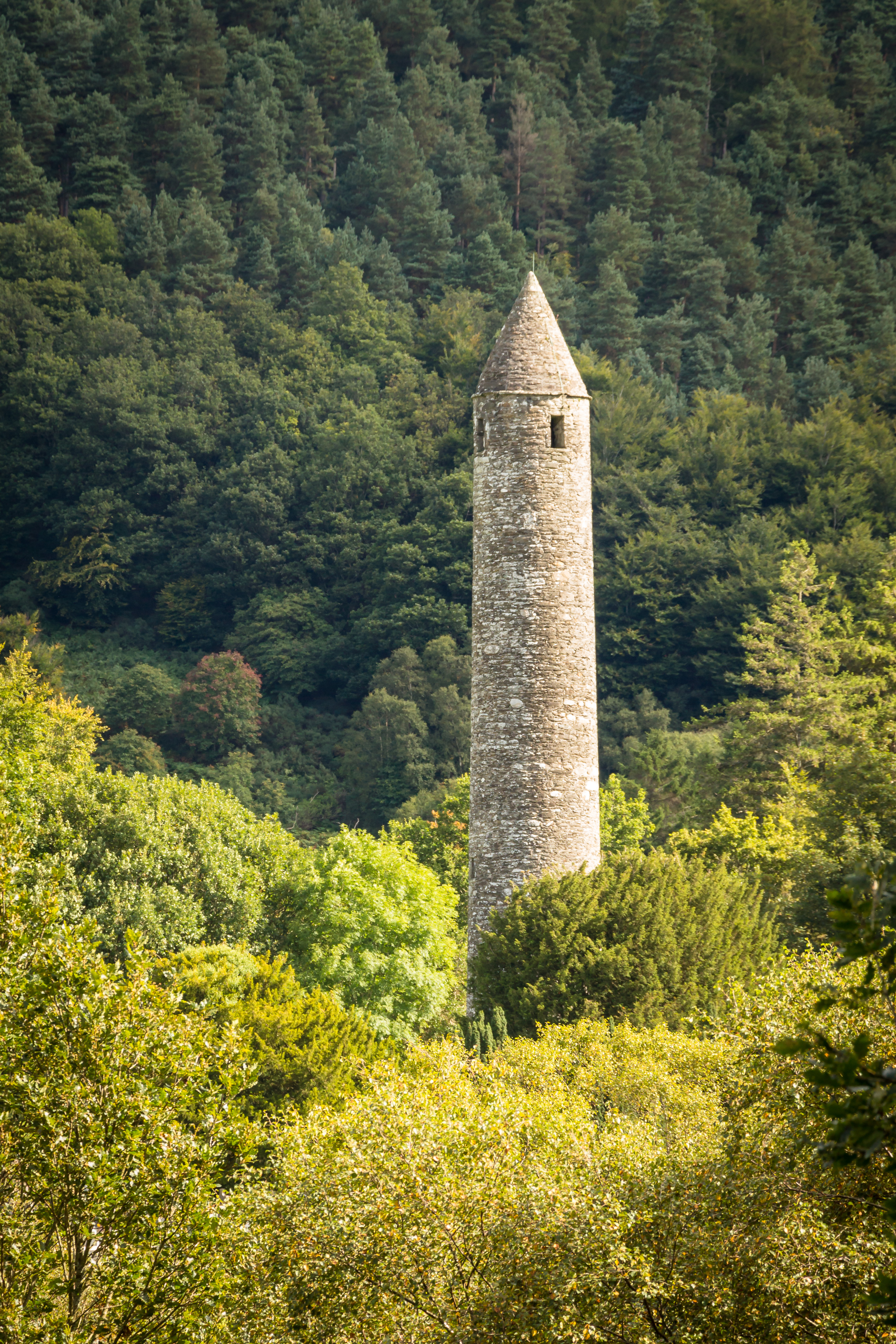
The round tower in Glendalough, Ireland, is approximately 30 metres tall

Eventually, some Vikings settled permanently in Ireland, and the main cities were established by the Vikings. Although no buildings from that era are now intact, some street arrangements have their origins in the original Viking layouts. Remains of Viking dwellings have been discovered in many locations, but notably at Wood Quay in Dublin, King John's Castle in Limerick and near Waterford (where what is thought to be the original settlement at Waterford has been uncovered in 2004 during construction of the city's ring road).

== Medieval Ireland ==
After early stone remains, the next most visible features in the Irish countryside are the innumerable castle remains, tower houses and intact castles. Apart from well-known and restored castles such as Bunratty Castle, many unknown remains (particularly of tower houses) exist next to newer farmhouses, or again, simply in fields. Carrickfergus Castle, built by John de Courcy in 1177, as his headquarters after his invasion of Ulster, is the most perfectly preserved Norman castle on the island. The castle at Cahir is also a particularly well-preserved example.

Many fine churches in Ireland were also built during this time, such as St. Canice's Cathedral in Kilkenny and St. Mary's Cathedral in Limerick. Most common was the Romanesque style, as seen at Cormac's Chapel on the Rock of Cashel, and at Clonfert Cathedral in Galway. It was the Normans who brought the Gothic style to Ireland, with such buildings as Christ Church and St. Patrick's Cathedral in Dublin.

Some of Ireland's main cities were built up and fortified before and during the mediaeval period. Limerick remained a walled city until the 18th century, while Derry's medieval walls still stand today. Such features as King John's Castle were built as major fortifications.

Cork and Galway flourished as sea ports, with the establishment of extensive quays in those cities, as well as Limerick and Dublin. Many ancillary buildings were built, such as granaries, storehouses, and early administrative buildings such as custom houses, tholsels and market houses. Some were replaced, rebuilt or removed – many remaining port facilities date from more recent centuries.

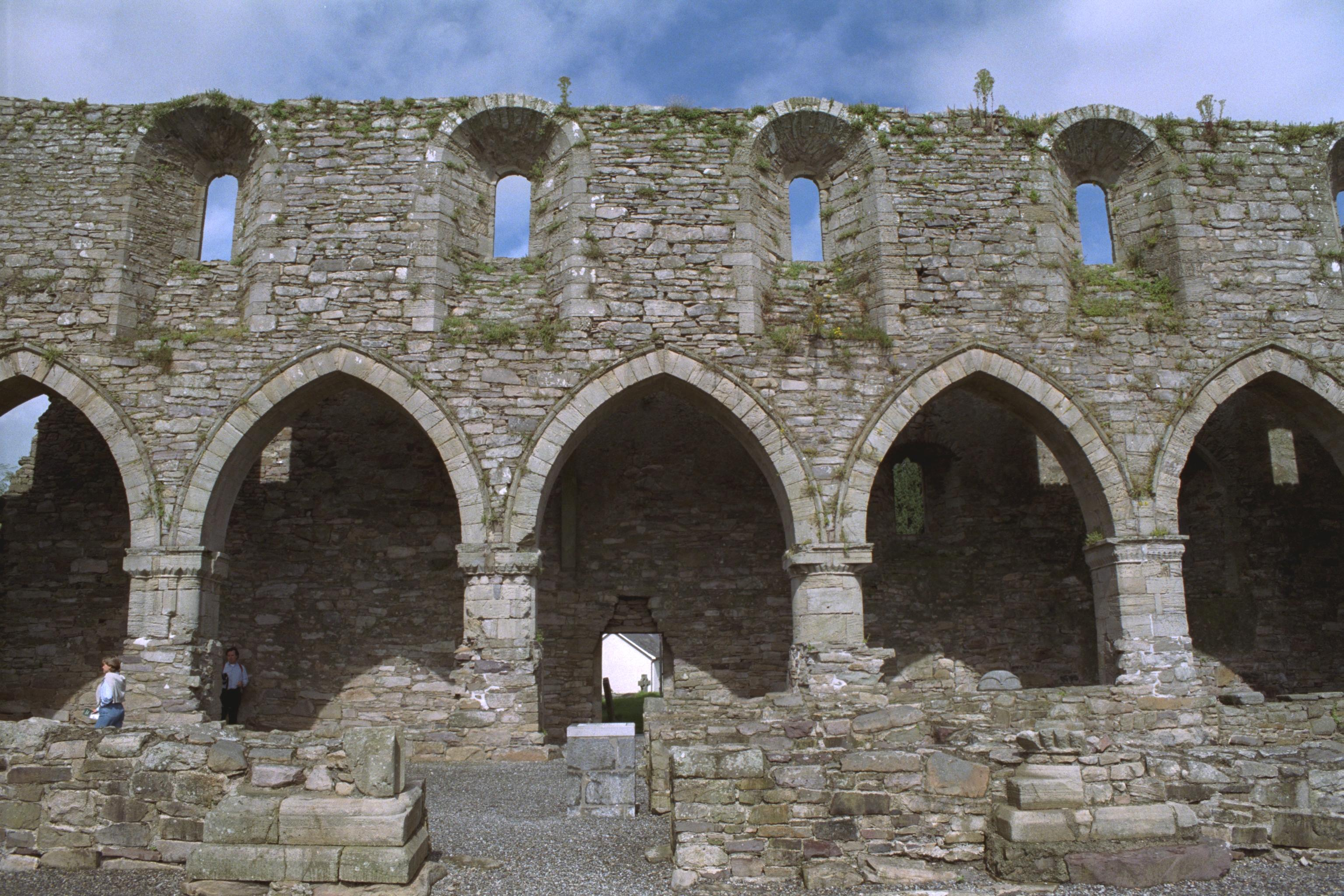
Arches of Jerpoint Abbey in County Kilkenny (12th to 15th century)

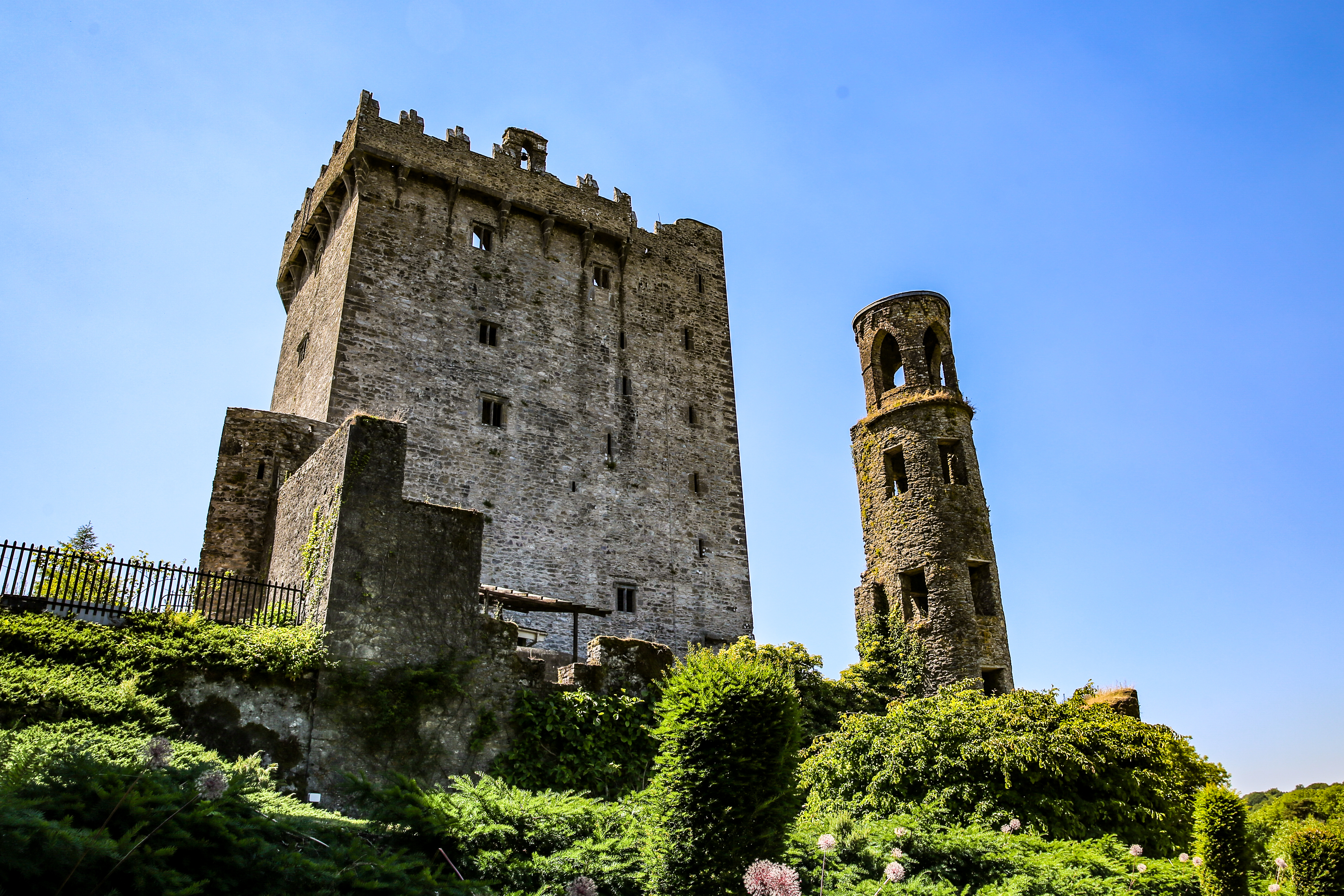
Blarney Castle (12th to 15th century)

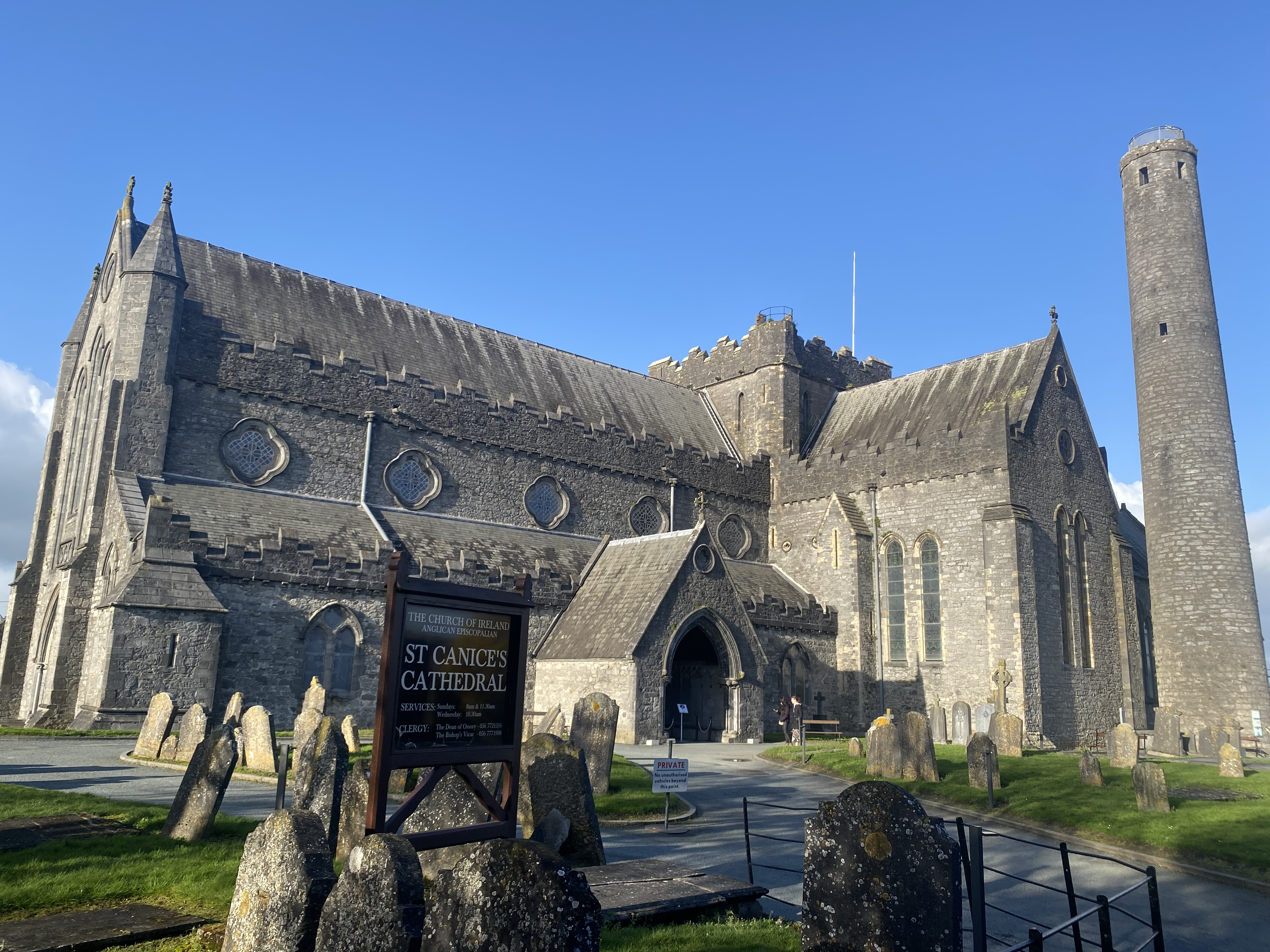
St Canice's Cathedral, Kilkenny (completed 1285)

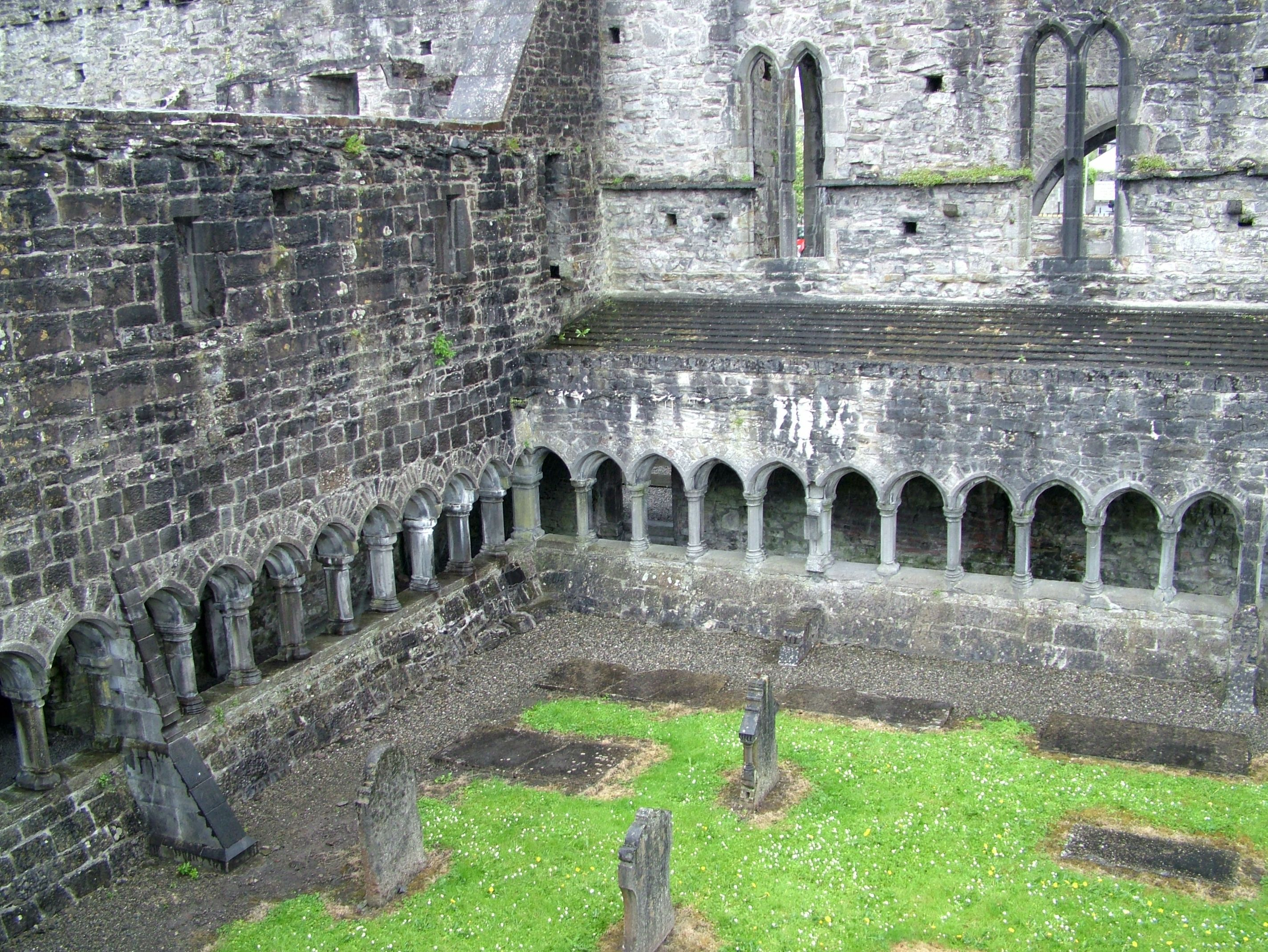
Cloisters of Sligo Abbey (13th century, restored 1416)

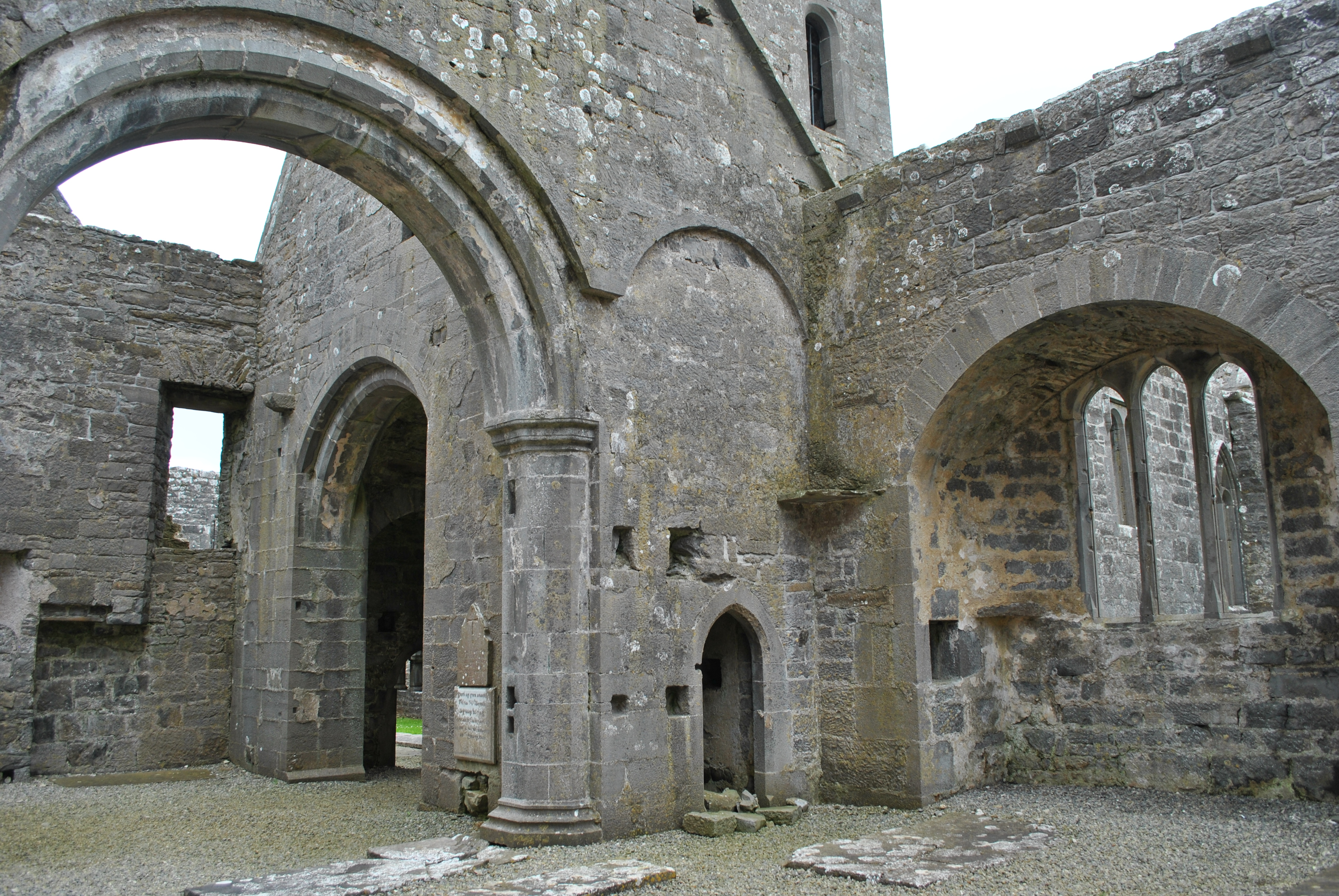
Moyne Abbey, mid-15th century

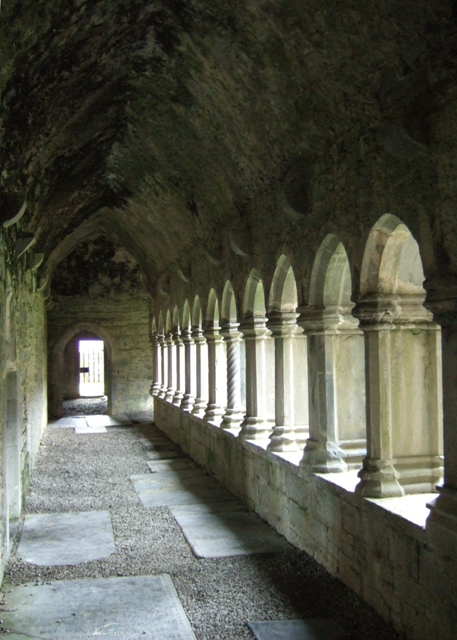
Cloisters at Quin Abbey, early 15th century

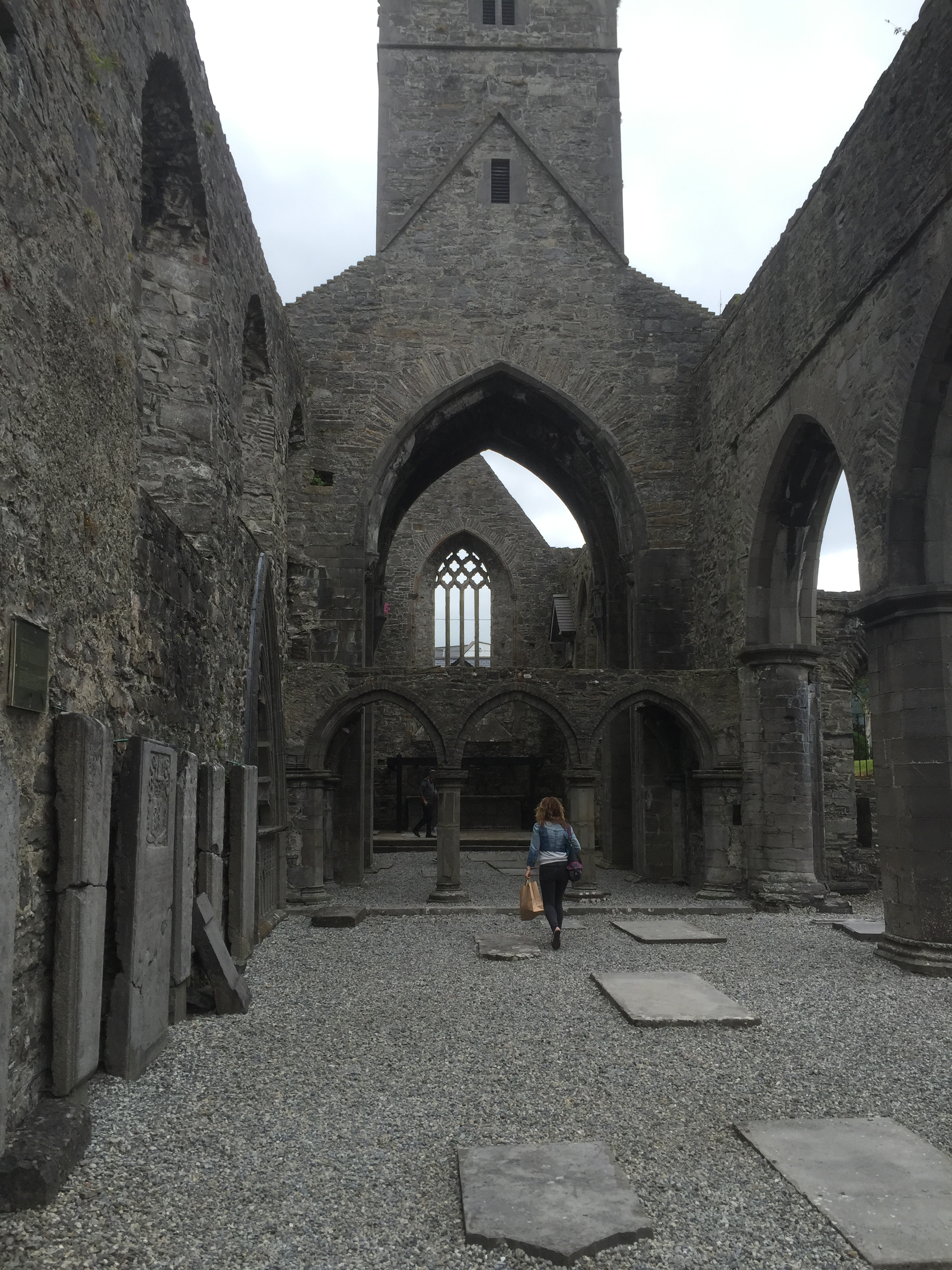
Sligo Friary nave, 13th century, restored 1416

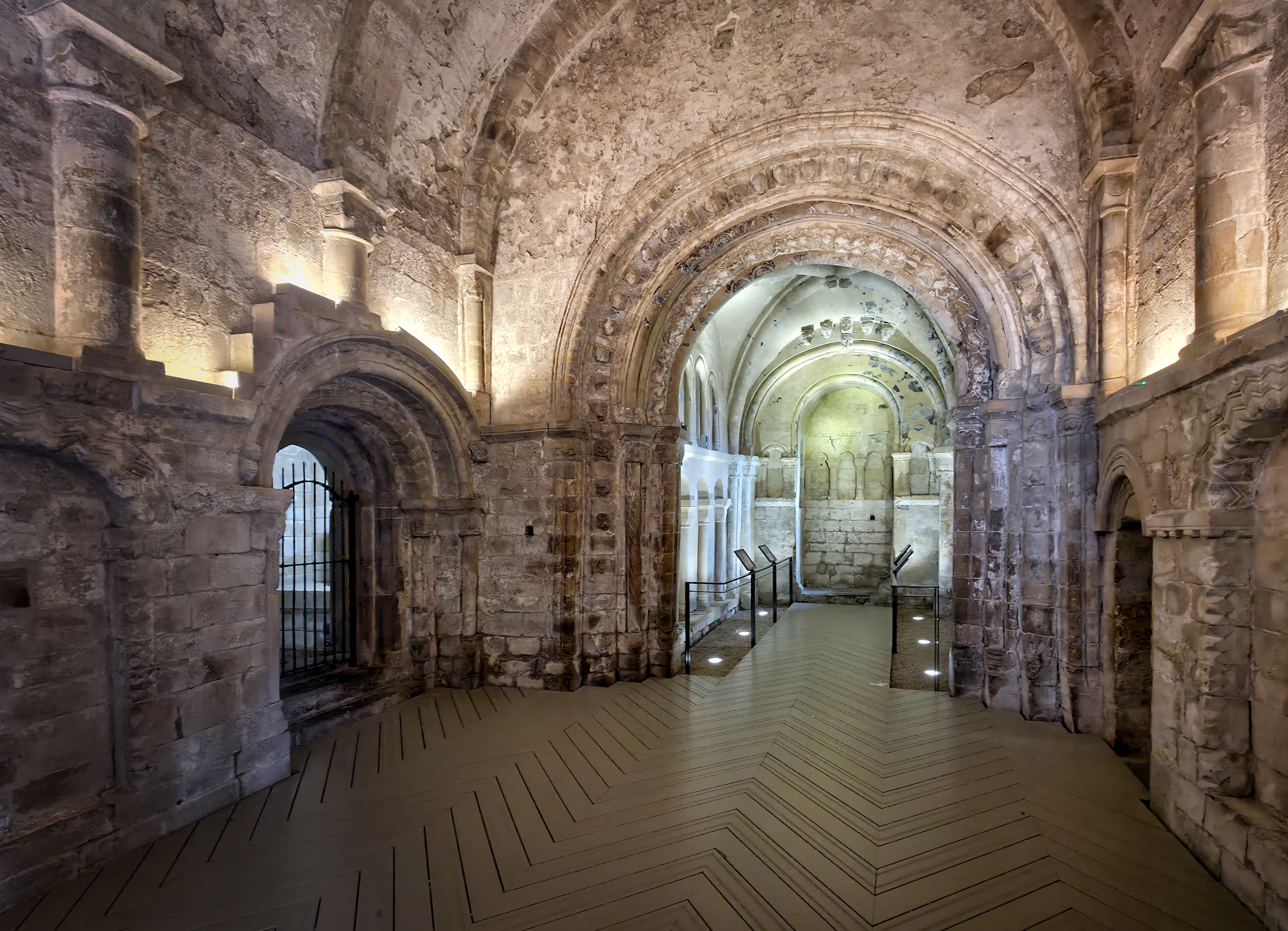
Nave of Cormac's Chapel, Rock of Cashel

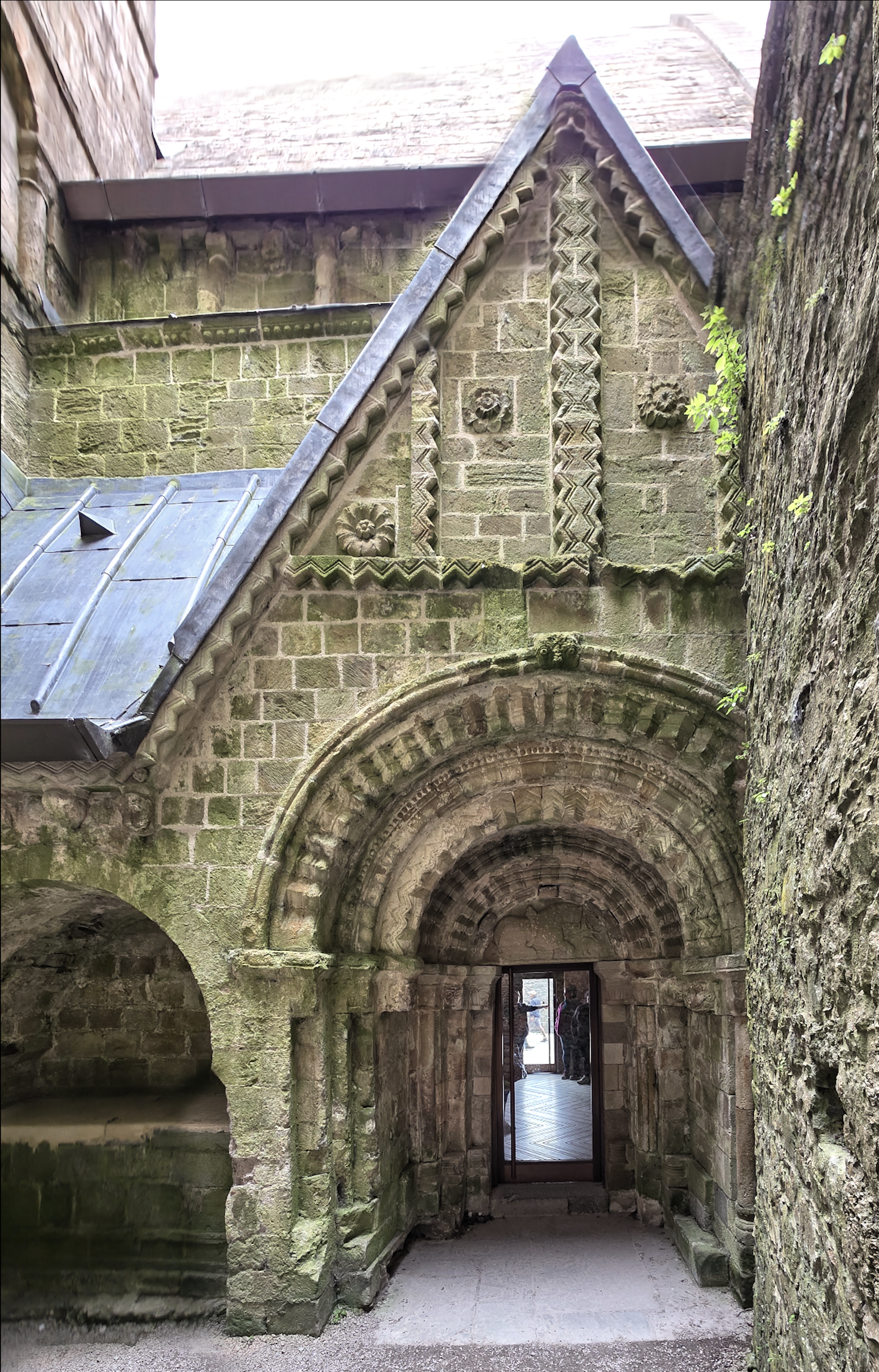
Gabled arch, Cormac's Chapel, Rock of Cashel

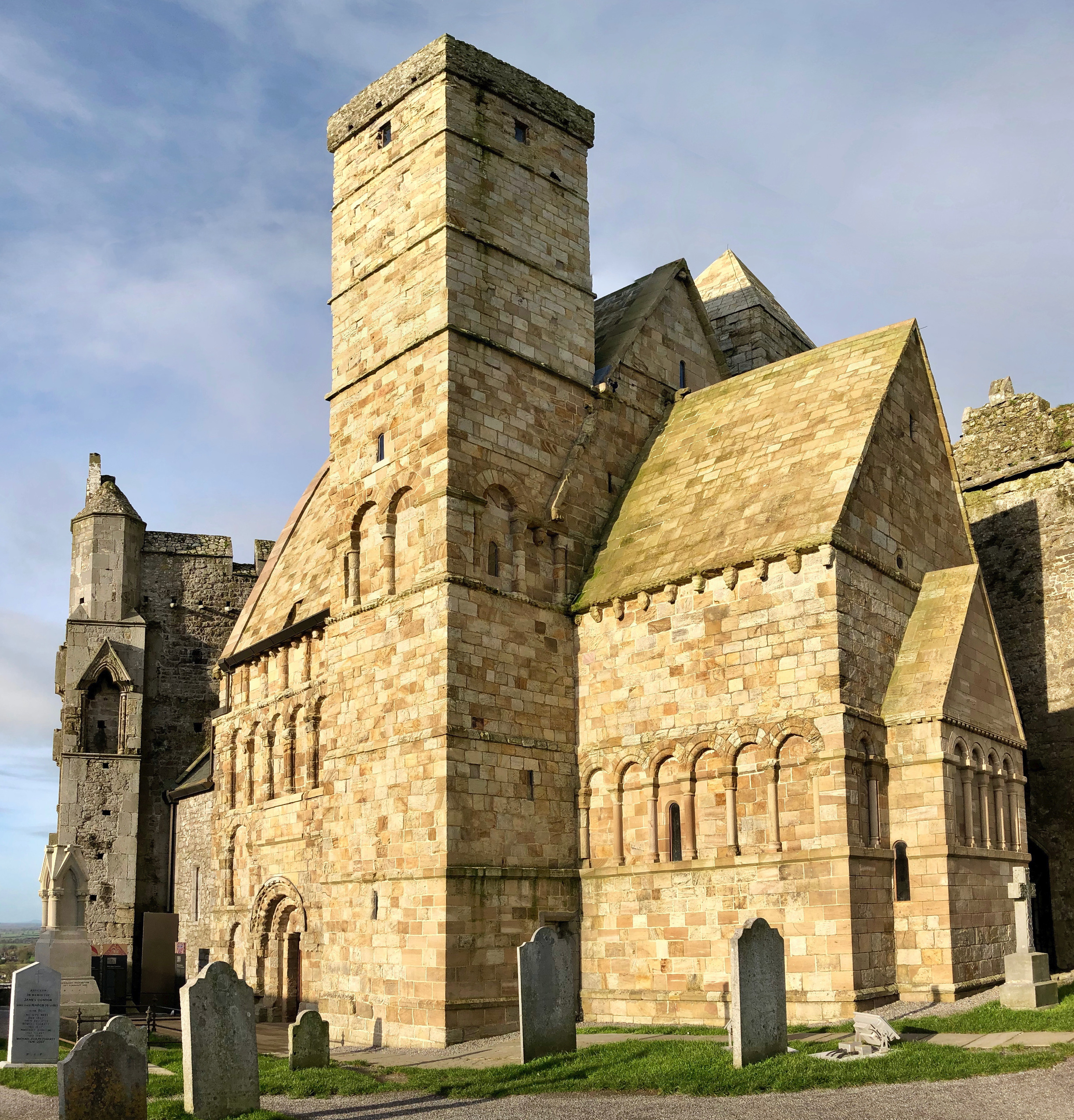
Cormac's Chapel, Rock of Cashel

== The Restoration and after ==
In the decades after the Stuart Restoration, English Baroque architectural styles, including Queen Anne style architecture, were popular in Ireland. This was epitomised by the buildings designed by Sir William Robinson between the 1670s and early 1700s, most notably the Royal Hospital Kilmainham and Marsh's Library. Also notable was Thomas Burgh (1670–1730), the architect of Trinity College Library (1712), Dr Steevens' Hospital (1719) and the Royal Barracks (1702).

In the early 18th century classical Palladian architecture swept through Ireland, the driving force behind this new fashion was the Irish architect Edward Lovett Pearce. Pearce, born in County Meath in 1699, had studied architecture in Italy, before returning in 1725 to Ireland to oversee, and later, almost, co-design Ireland's first Palladian mansion Castletown House.

Castletown house was a milestone in Irish architecture, designed originally by the Italian Alessandro Galilei, circa 1717, in the manner of an Italian town palazzo, for Ireland's most influential man, the politician Speaker William Conolly, it set a new standard and fashion in Irish architecture. The original architect had returned to Italy before the first stone was laid, subsequently the Irish Pearce was responsible not only for the construction, but modification and improvement to the original plan. From the mid-1720s onwards almost every sizeable building, in Ireland, was cast in the Palladian mould.

Through Castletown and his later work, including the Irish Houses of Parliament, Pearce had firmly established many of the Italian architectural concepts in Ireland. Following Pearce's death in 1733, his protégé Richard Cassels (also known as Richard Castle) was to design many of Ireland's finest buildings in a similar, if not more robust, form of Palladian. Many fine country houses were built in the Palladian style around the country by the rich Ascendancy in Ireland. Some, such as Leinster House, designed by Sir William Chamber and Russborough House (illustrated below), were among the finest examples of Palladian architecture. Palladianism in Ireland often differed from that elsewhere in Europe because of the ornate rococo interiors, often with stucco by Robert West and the Lafranchini brothers. Although many of these mansions, such as Pearce and Cassels' joint design Summerhill House, were destroyed in the numerous Irish rebellions, many examples of this unique marrying of the rococo and Palladian still remain today as unique examples of Irish Palladianism.

Elsewhere in Dublin, George Semple built St Patrick's Hospital (1747) and Thomas Cooley the Royal Exchange (1769; now City Hall).

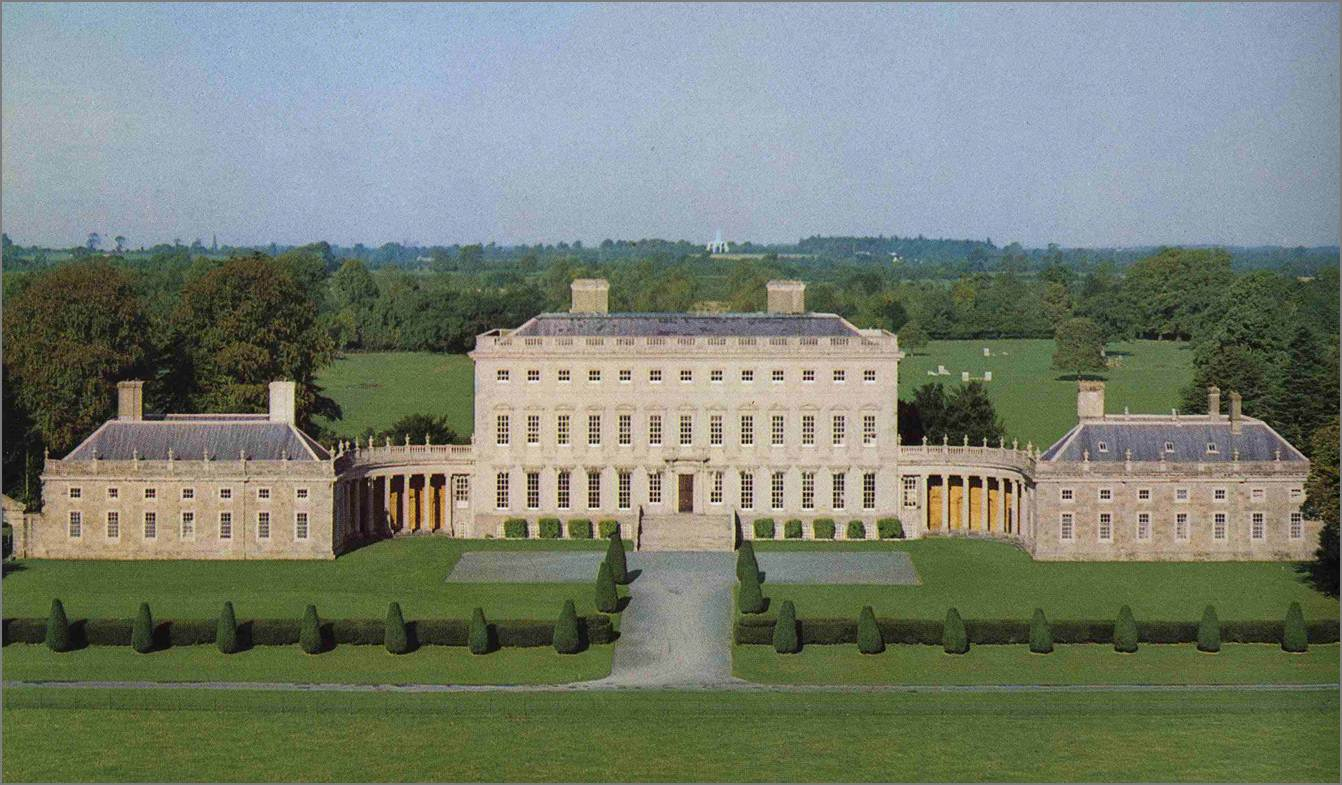
Castletown House by Alessandro Galilei and Edward Lovett Pearce (1722)

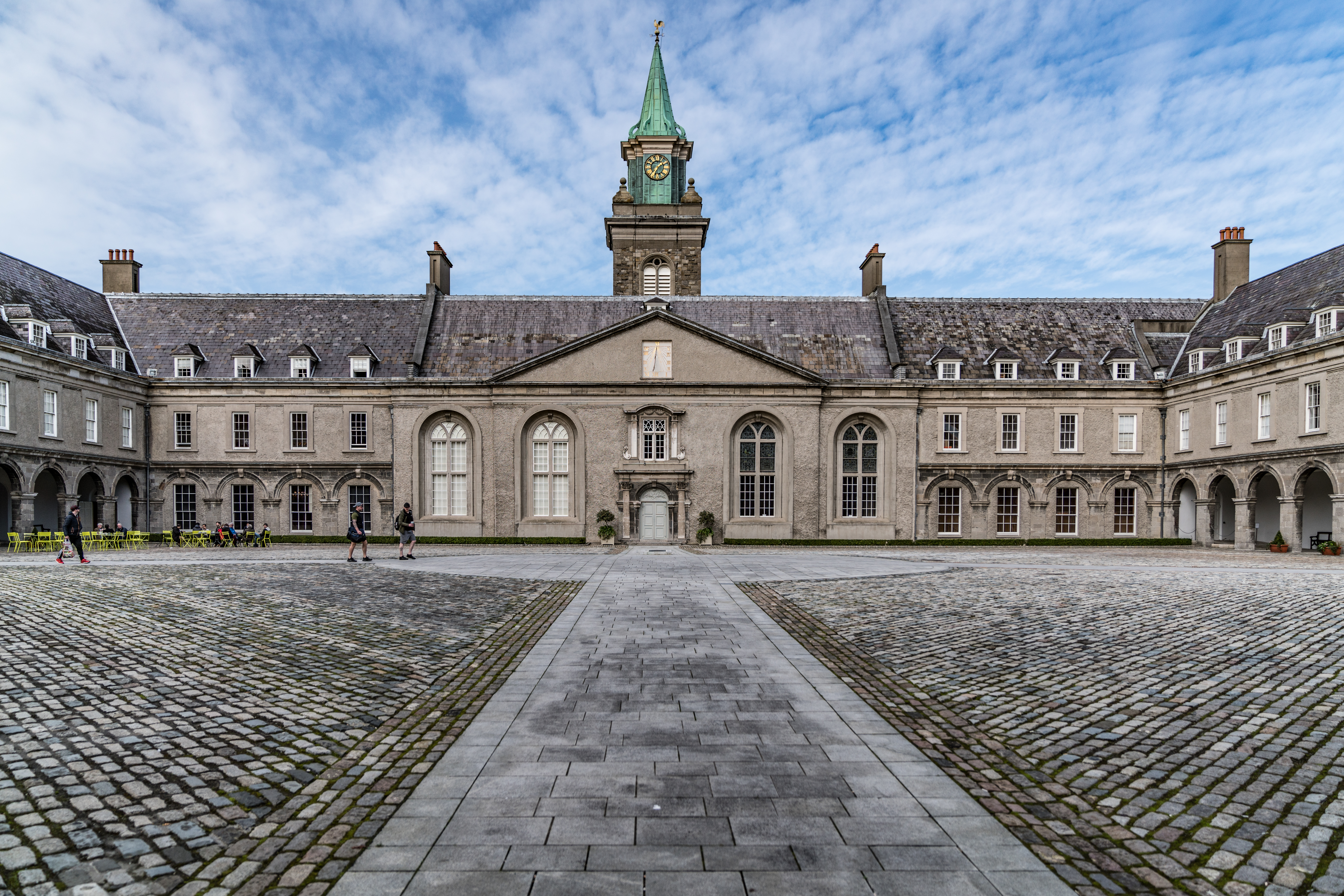
Royal Hospital Kilmainham, designed by Sir William Robinson and completed in 1684

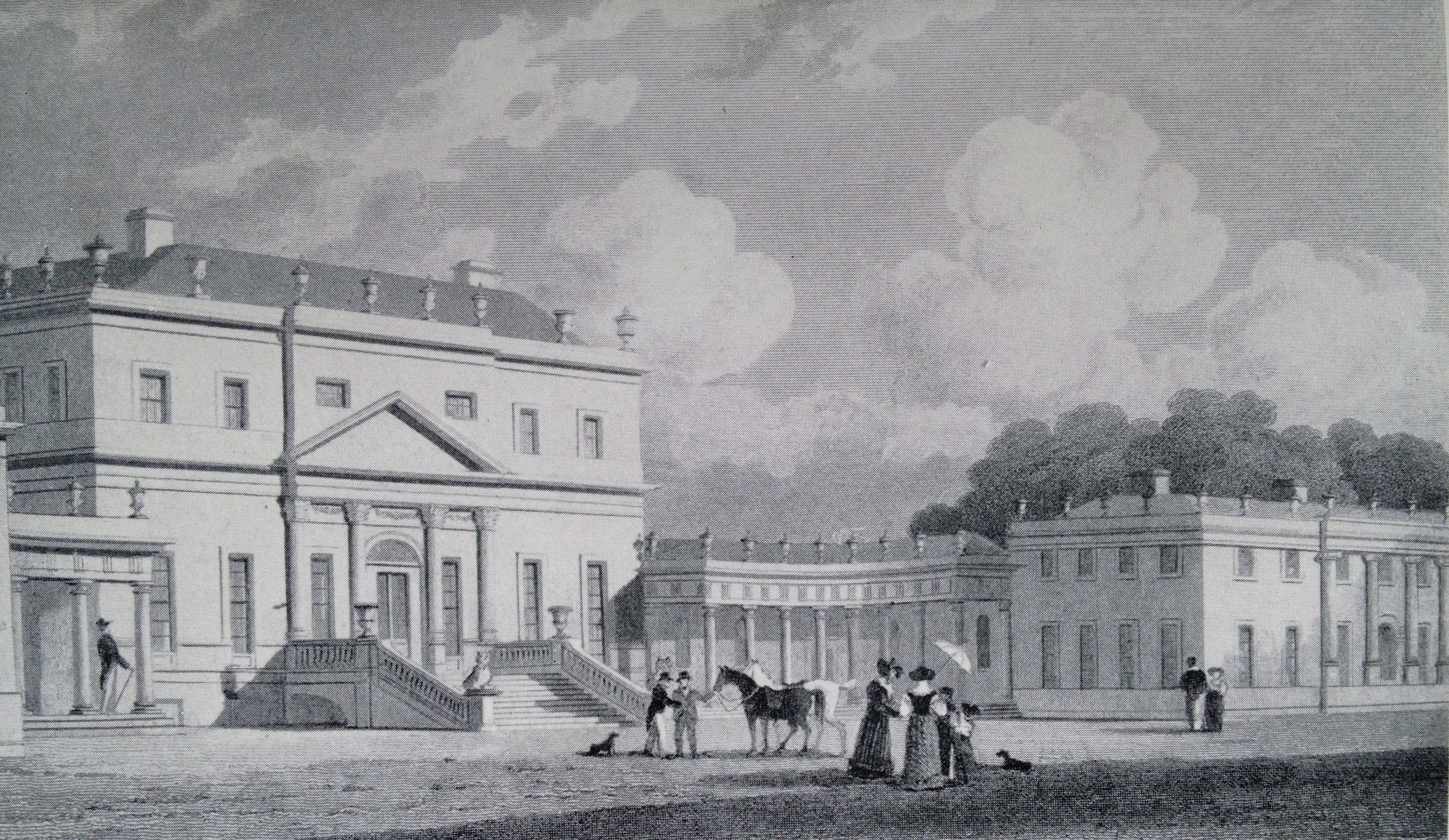
Russborough House, designed by the German Richard Cassels circa 1750

== Georgian Ireland ==
In the later half of the 18th century, one of the most important architects in the country was the London-born James Gandon. Gandon came to Ireland in 1781 at the invitation of Lord Carlow and John Beresford, the Irish commissioner of revenue. Gandon's buildings in Dublin include the Custom House, the Four Courts, the King's Inns and the eastern extension to the Irish parliament building in College Green. By this time the Palladian style had evolved further, and the strict rules of mathematical ratio and axis dictated by Palladio had been all but abandoned. This subsequent evolution is generally referred to as Georgian architecture. It is in this style that large parts of Dublin were rebuilt, causing the city to be referred to as Georgian Dublin.

Francis Johnston was the third great Irish architect of this period. Johnston served as Architect to the Board of Works for a time and was thus responsible for much of the planning of Georgian Dublin. He also left a number of very fine buildings, including St. George's Church, Hardwicke Place and the Viceregal Lodge in the Phoenix Park. This latter now serves as Áras an Uachtaráin, the official residence of the President of Ireland, and is one possible model for the White House in Washington. Leinster House also claims this distinction, and the Neoclassical Castle Coole in County Fermanagh designed by James Wyatt bears an even greater similarity.

In addition to these large-scale buildings, the defining characteristic of Georgian city planning was terraces, squares of elegant family homes even with parks, one of them being St. Stephen's Green, one of Dublin's largest parks. In Ireland, many of these became tenements during the course of the 19th century and a significant proportion were demolished as part of various 20th-century slum clearance programmes. However, many squares and terraces survive in both Dublin and Limerick. Of particular interest are Pery Square in the latter city and Merrion Square, one of Dublin's most iconic square, in the former. Some smaller towns in Ireland also have Georgian architecture of interest, such as the fine Georgian squares and terraces of Mountmellick, County Laois, and Birr, County Offaly, which is a designated Irish Heritage Town.

Near the end of George III's reign, one of Ireland's most famous Georgian buildings was completed. The GPO was built in 1814 and located on Dublin's main street, O'Connell Street. Designed by Francis Johnston, the building's most striking feature is its hexastyle Ionic portico. Above the building are three statues representing Fidelity, Hibernia and Mercury. The interior is made up largely of a postal hall with a high ceiling. The building has been largely rebuilt since its original construction, mainly due to severe damage incurred in the Easter Rising in 1916.

To enhance the new buildings and cope with larger traffic volumes, the Wide Streets Commission was established in 1757. It bought houses by compulsory purchase to widen streets or to create new ones.

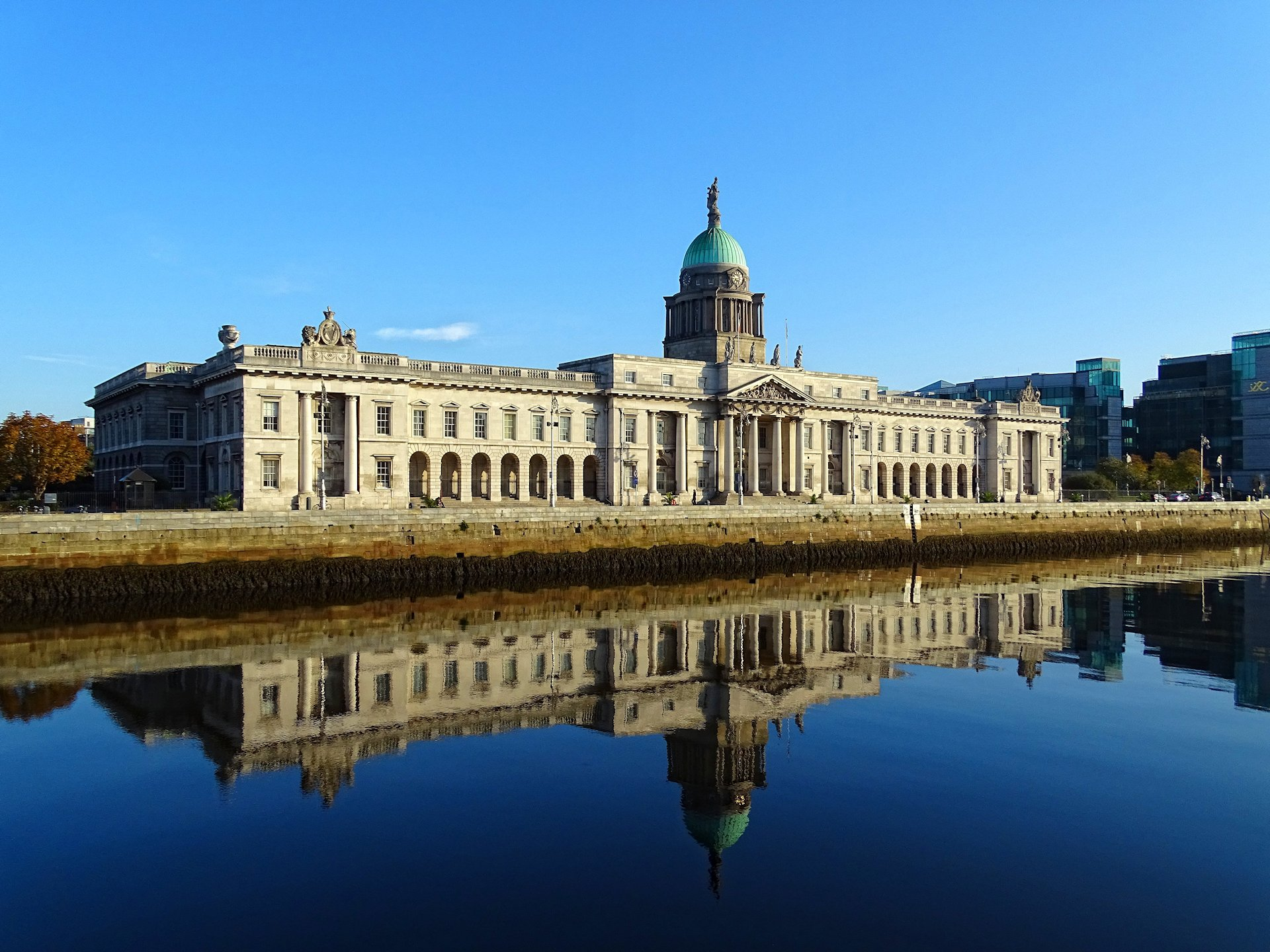
The Custom House, Dublin by James Gandon (1791)

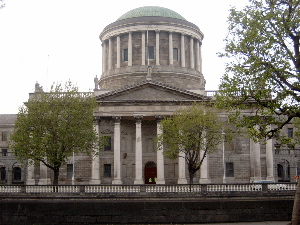
The Four Courts by James Gandon (1802)

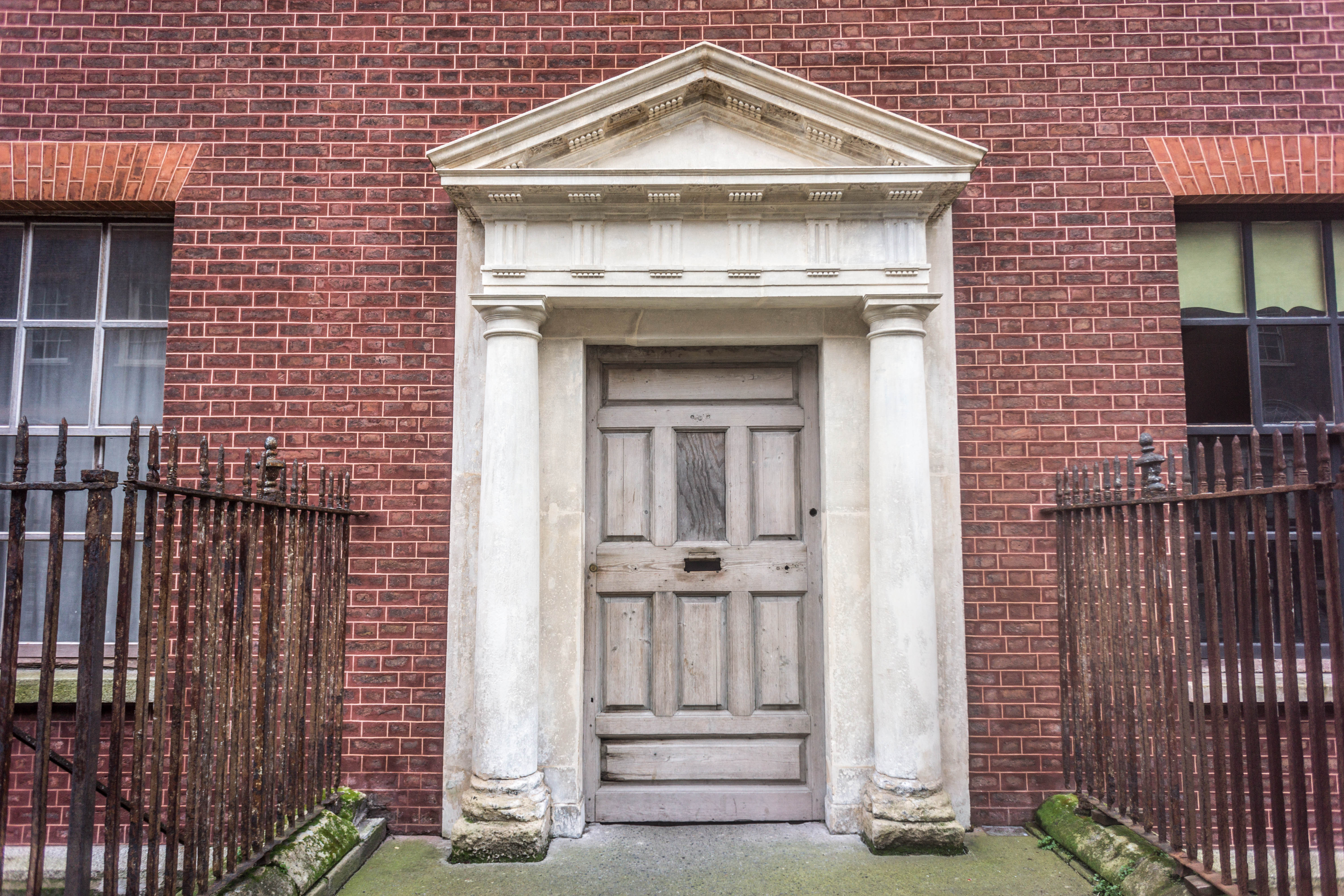
A Georgian door on Henrietta Street, which contains some of the oldest and largest Georgian houses in Dublin. These became tenements in the 19th century.

== Victorian period ==
During the 19th century, because all of Ireland was a constituent part of the United Kingdom, British architecture continued to influence building styles in Ireland. Many prominent Irish buildings were designed and built in Ireland during this period (1837–1901), including Abbey Presbyterian Church on Parnell Square, the Royal City of Dublin Hospital, Olympia Theatre, the Central Markets in Cork, the National Museum of Ireland, the National Library of Ireland, the Natural History Museum, and the National Gallery of Ireland. Many of these new buildings were located in the Southside of Dublin in places like Kildare Street and Baggot Street and in the centre of Cork. An important contributor was the notable English architect, Decimus Burton. He remodelled much of Cobh, commissioned by the 5th Viscount Midleton, in the 1840s. He was the designer of Martinstown House in County Kildare. Prior to that he spent almost two decades renovating the vast neglected public areas of Phoenix Park in Dublin and incidentally designing Dublin Zoo.

However, few buildings were built outside the major cities other than a few railway stations in the provincial towns.

During the Victorian period, many new statues were erected in Ireland, particularly in Dublin, Belfast and Cork. These included several rather elegant statues of figures such as Queen Victoria, Daniel O'Connell and Henry Grattan.

One of Ireland's finest Victorian buildings is the cathedral dedicated to St Mary at Killarney; it is built in a Neo-Gothic style known as 'Lancet-arched Gothic', so called because the cathedral has many long, slender lancet-shaped windows with acutely pointed arches. The architect was August Pugin, one of the greatest of Victorian architects. The cathedral—begun in 1842, funded by public subscription, and interrupted by the horrors of famine—was finally dedicated in 1855. The design is typical of Irish Gothic; it blends Corinthian and Doric orders and is decorated with Sicilian marble and Caen stone. The cathedral is crowned by a spire of 280 feet (85 m). Pugin's work was eminently suited to Ireland. A convert to Roman Catholicism, he believed Gothic architecture to be the only style suitable for religious worship and attacked the earlier Neoclassical architecture as pagan and almost blasphemous. This philosophy embraced by the church in Ireland at the time helped to popularise the Gothic style in Victorian Ireland.

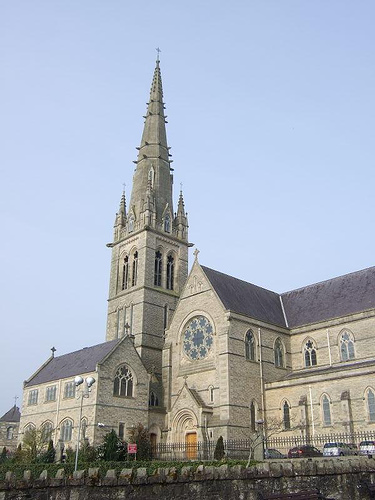
St Eunan's Cathedral, Letterkenny, in Ulster (1901)

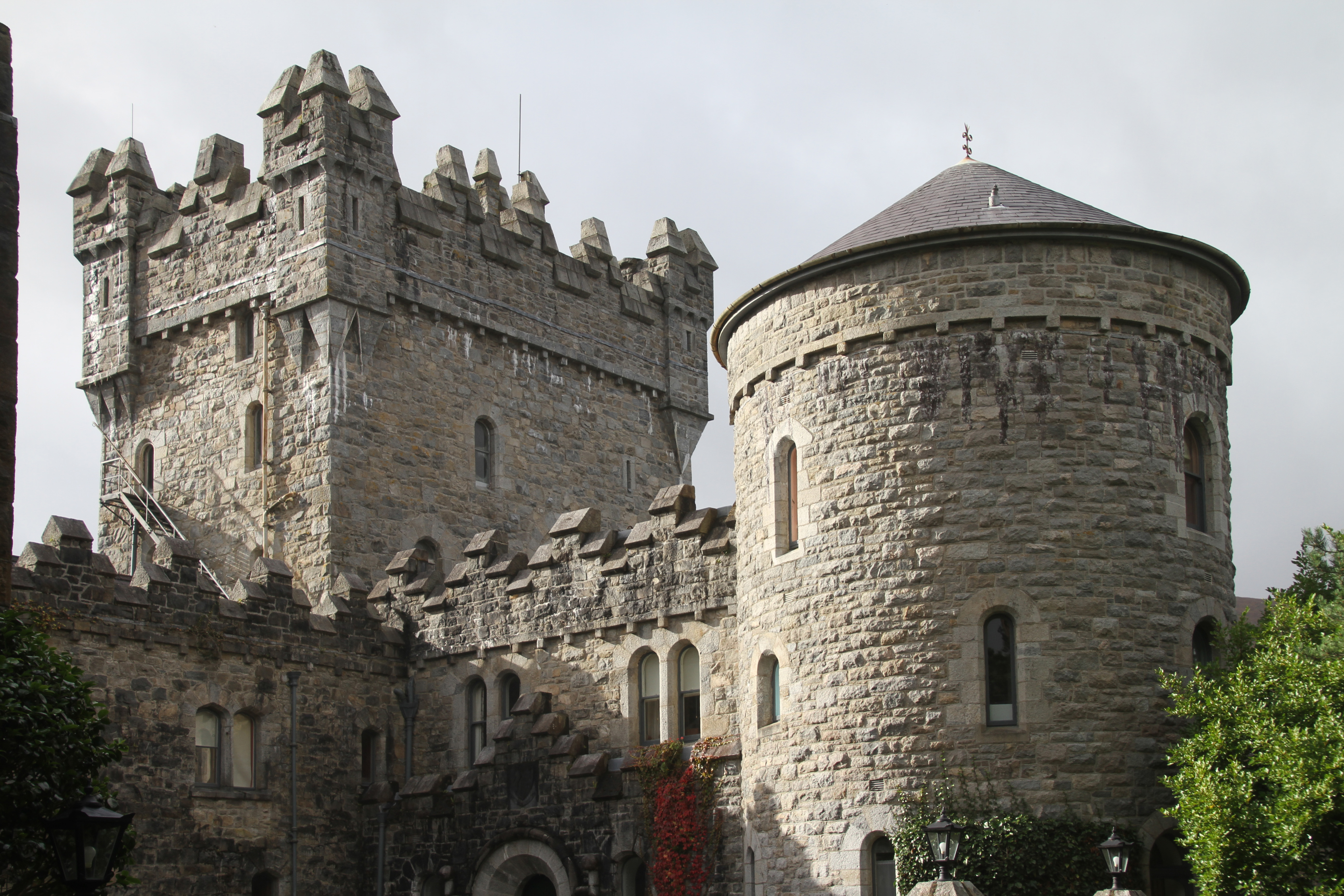
Glenveagh Castle, an example of Scots Baronial architecture from this period (c. 1870)

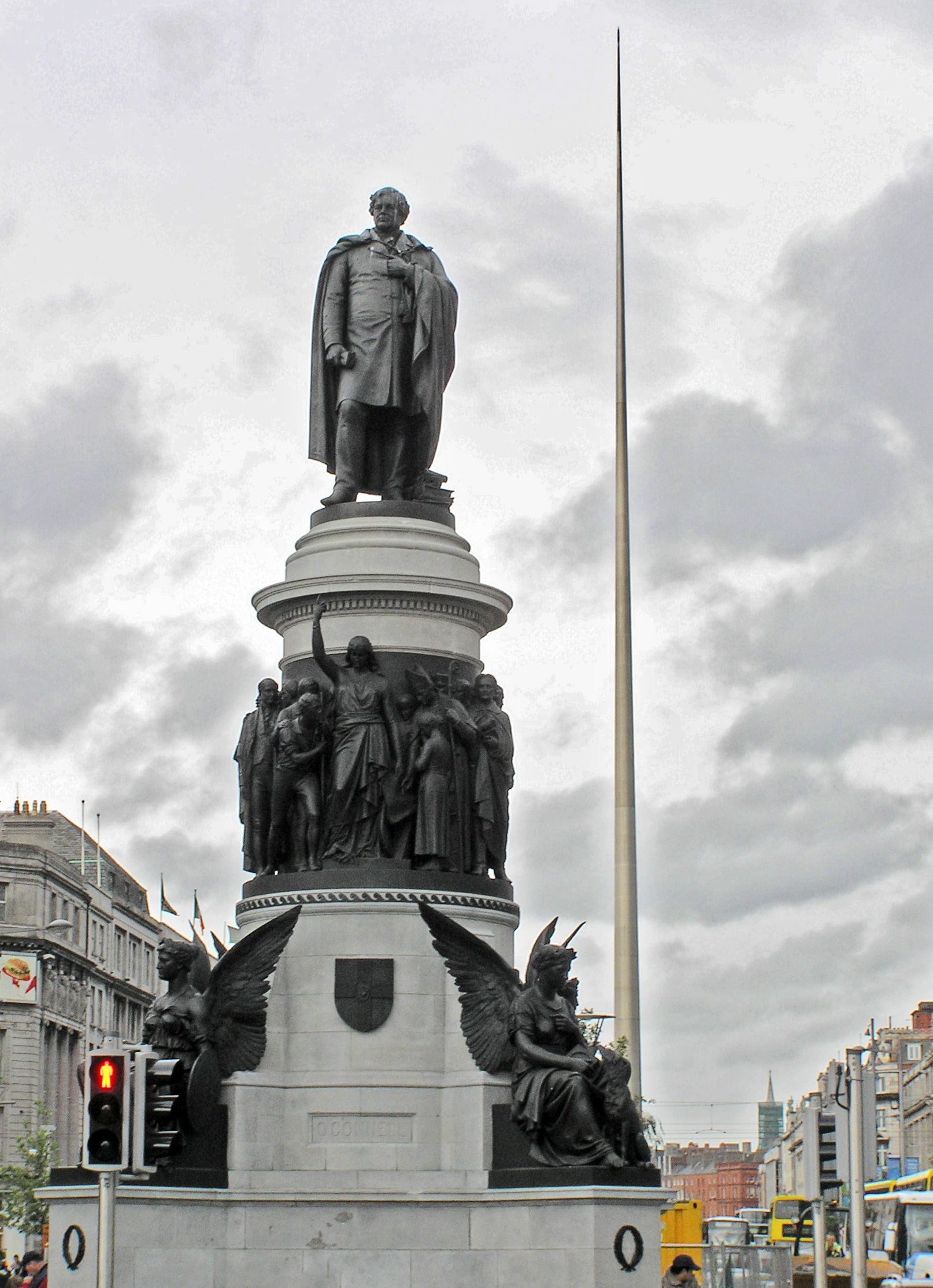
The O'Connell monument O'Connell St, Dublin by John Henry Foley and Thomas Brock (1882). In the background is the Spire of Dublin by Ian Ritchie Architects (2003), illustrating the embrace of new architectural styles in Ireland

== 20th century – present ==
In the 20th century, Irish architecture followed the international trend towards modern, sleek and often radical building styles, particularly after Partition and the independence of most of Ireland as the Irish Free State in the early 1920s. Two major exceptions to this were the Royal College of Science for Ireland (now Government Buildings), on Upper Merrion Street in central Dublin, and Parliament Buildings at Stormont in East Belfast, both built in more traditional architectural styles. New building materials and old were utilised in new ways to maximise style, space, light and energy efficiency. 1928 saw the construction of Ireland's first all concrete Art Deco church in Turner's Cross, Cork. The building was designed by Chicago architect Barry Byrne, who had learned his craft as apprentice to Frank Lloyd Wright. It met with a cool reception among those more accustomed to traditional designs.

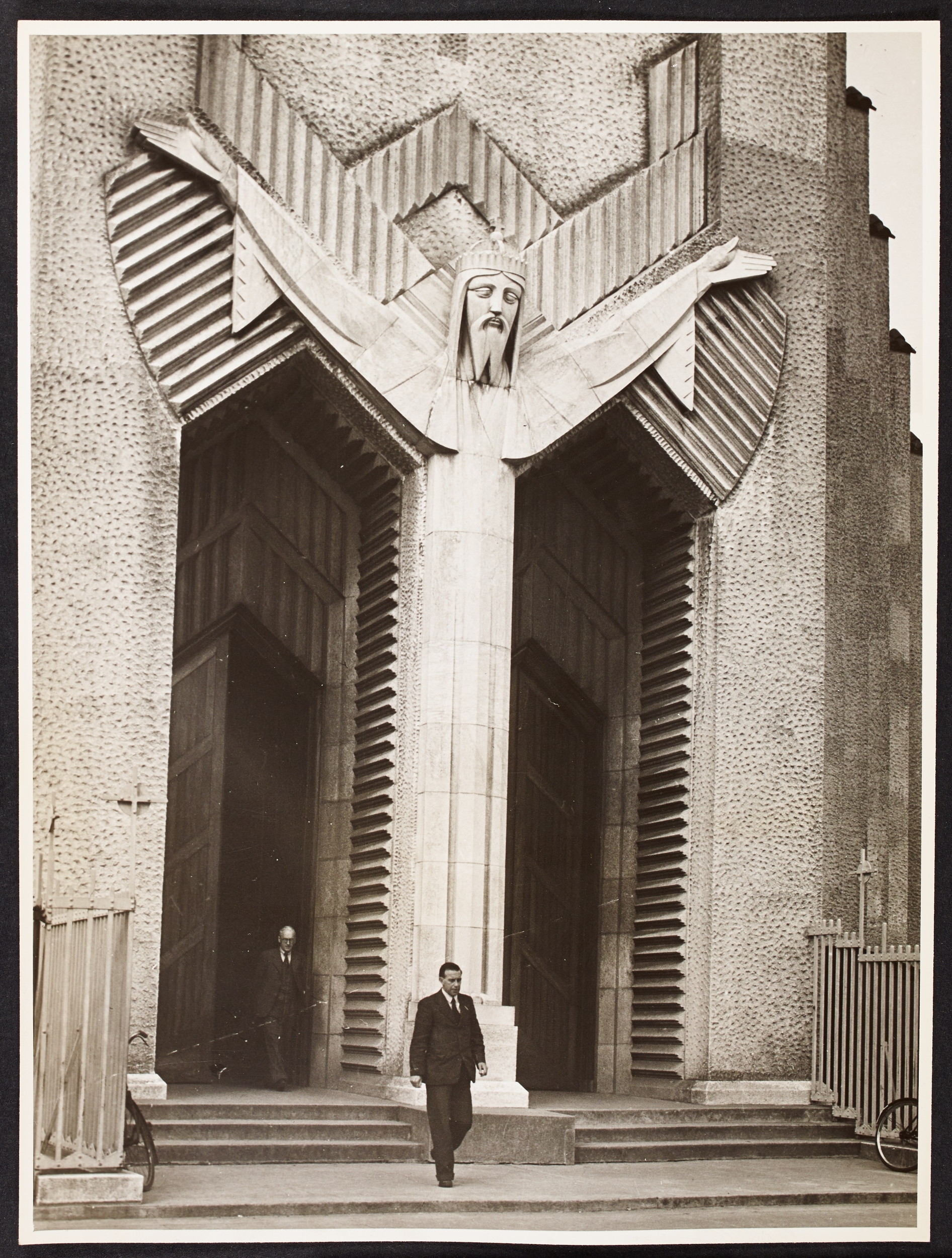
Church of Christ the King, Turner's Cross, Cork by Barry Byrne (1928)

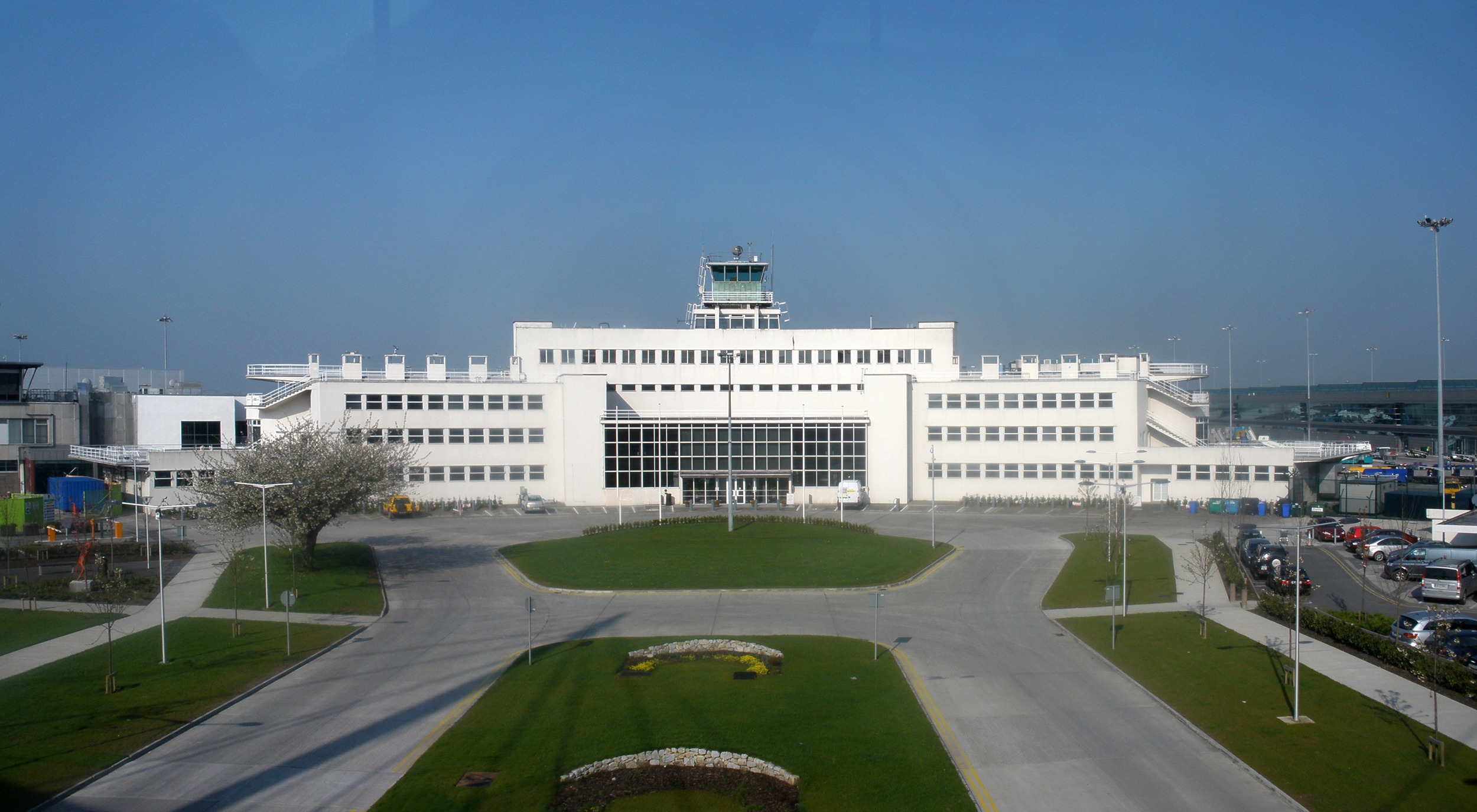
Dublin Airport terminal building by Desmond Fitzgerald and OPW (1940)

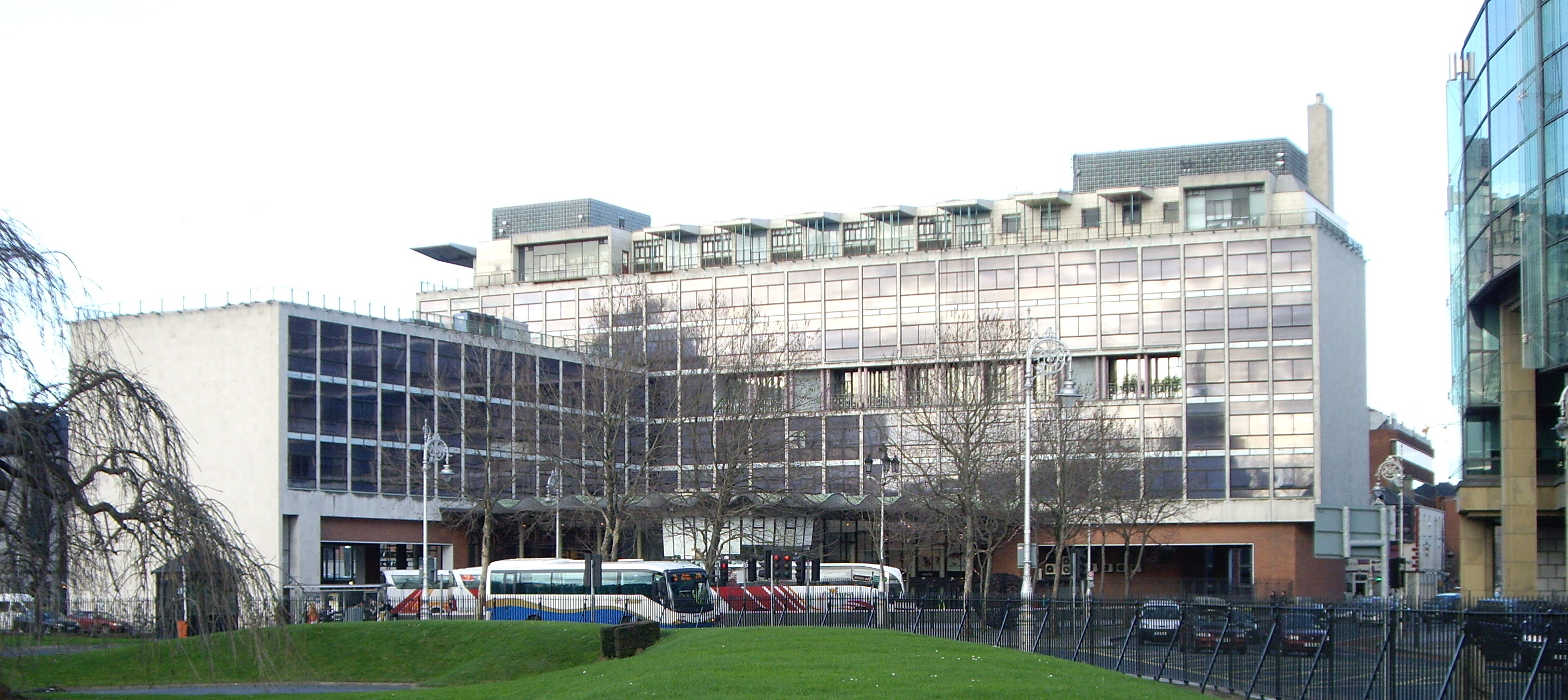
Busáras, Dublin by Michael Scott (1953)

In January 1940, the Art Deco Dublin airport opened, designed by Desmond FitzGerald and the Office of Public Works. It was awarded the RIAI Triennial Gold Medal for the years 1938–1940.

In 1953, one of Ireland's most radical buildings, Bus Éireann's main Dublin terminal building, better known as Busáras was completed. It was built despite considerable controversy at the time centred on its appearance and high cost(over £1m). Michael Scott, its designer, is now considered one of the most important architects of the twentieth century in Ireland. Busáras was awarded the RIAI Gold Medal for the years 1953–1955.

One of the main proponents of modernist and Brutalist architecture in Ireland was Sam Stephenson. Stephenson designed the Civic Offices (1979) and the Central Bank of Ireland (1980), both of which generated considerable controversy at the time of their construction. In the same period, Liam McCormick designed the modernist Met Éireann headquarters in Glasnevin, Dublin (1979).

In 1999 McCormick's St Aengus' Church, Burt, County Donegal was voted Ireland's "Building of the 20th century" in a readers' poll organised by the Royal Institute of the Architects of Ireland and the Sunday Tribune, It was also awarded the RIAI Gold Medal for the years 1965–1967.

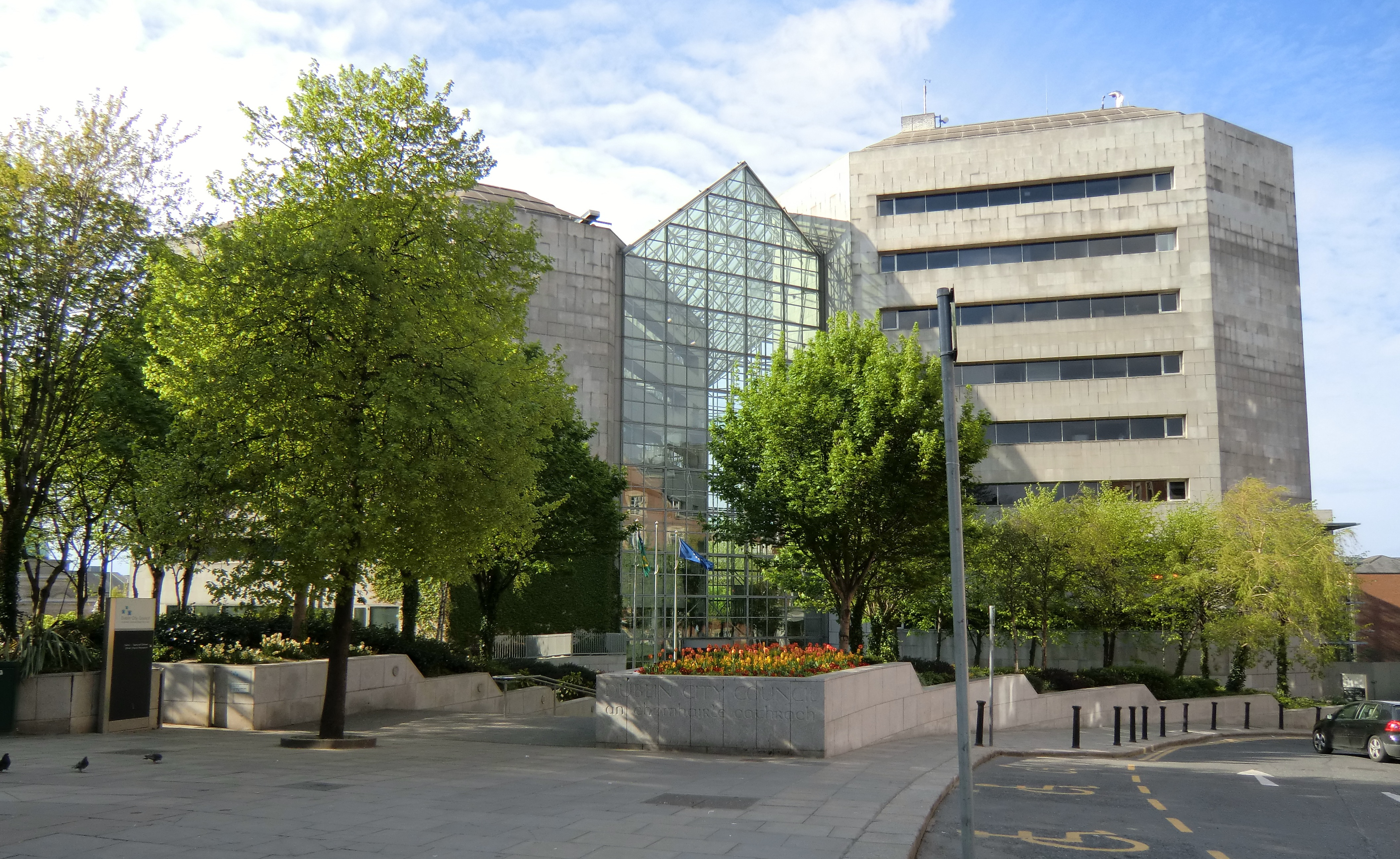
Dublin City Council Civic Offices by Sam Stephenson (1979)

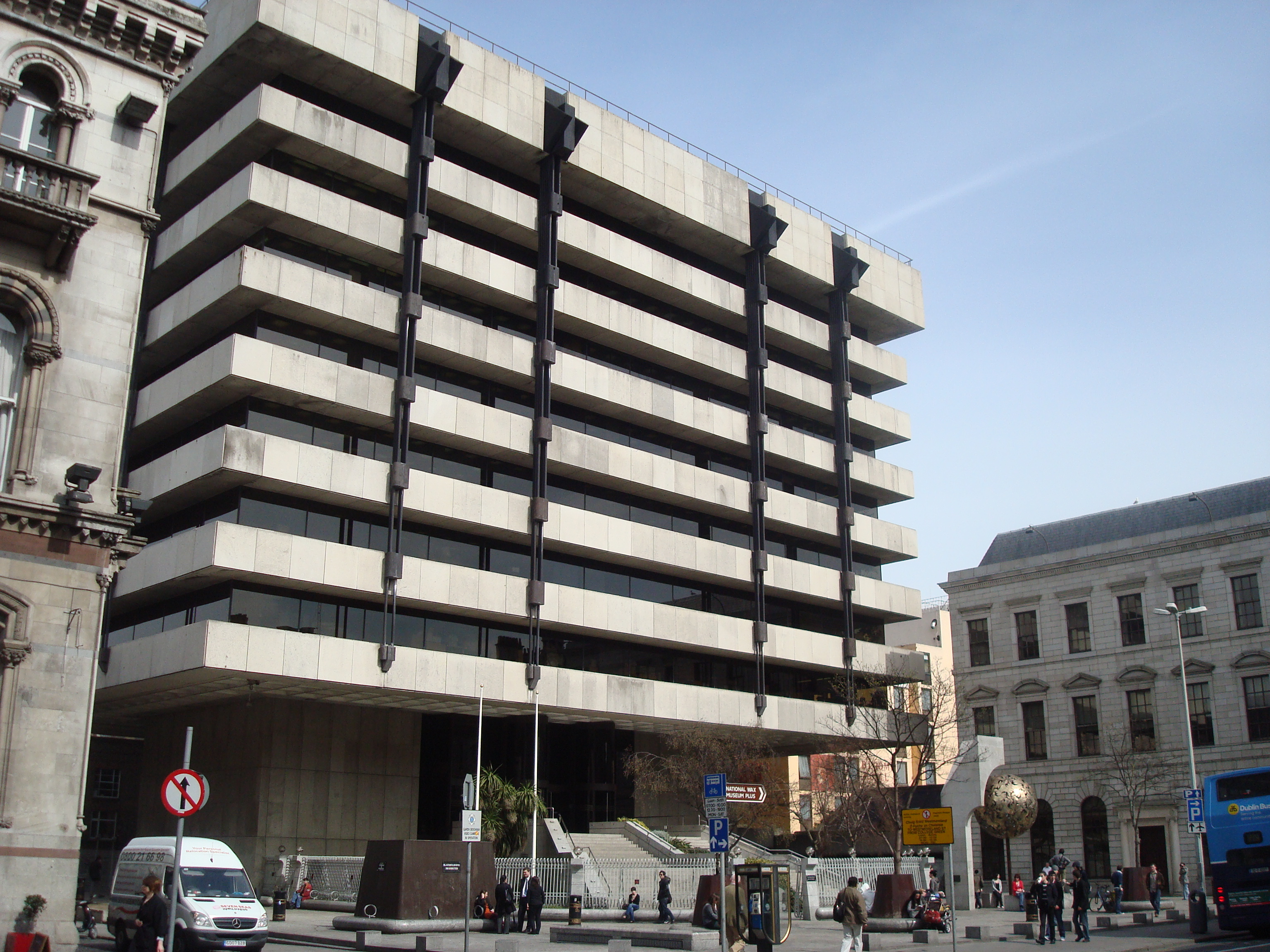
Central Bank of Ireland by Sam Stephenson (1980)

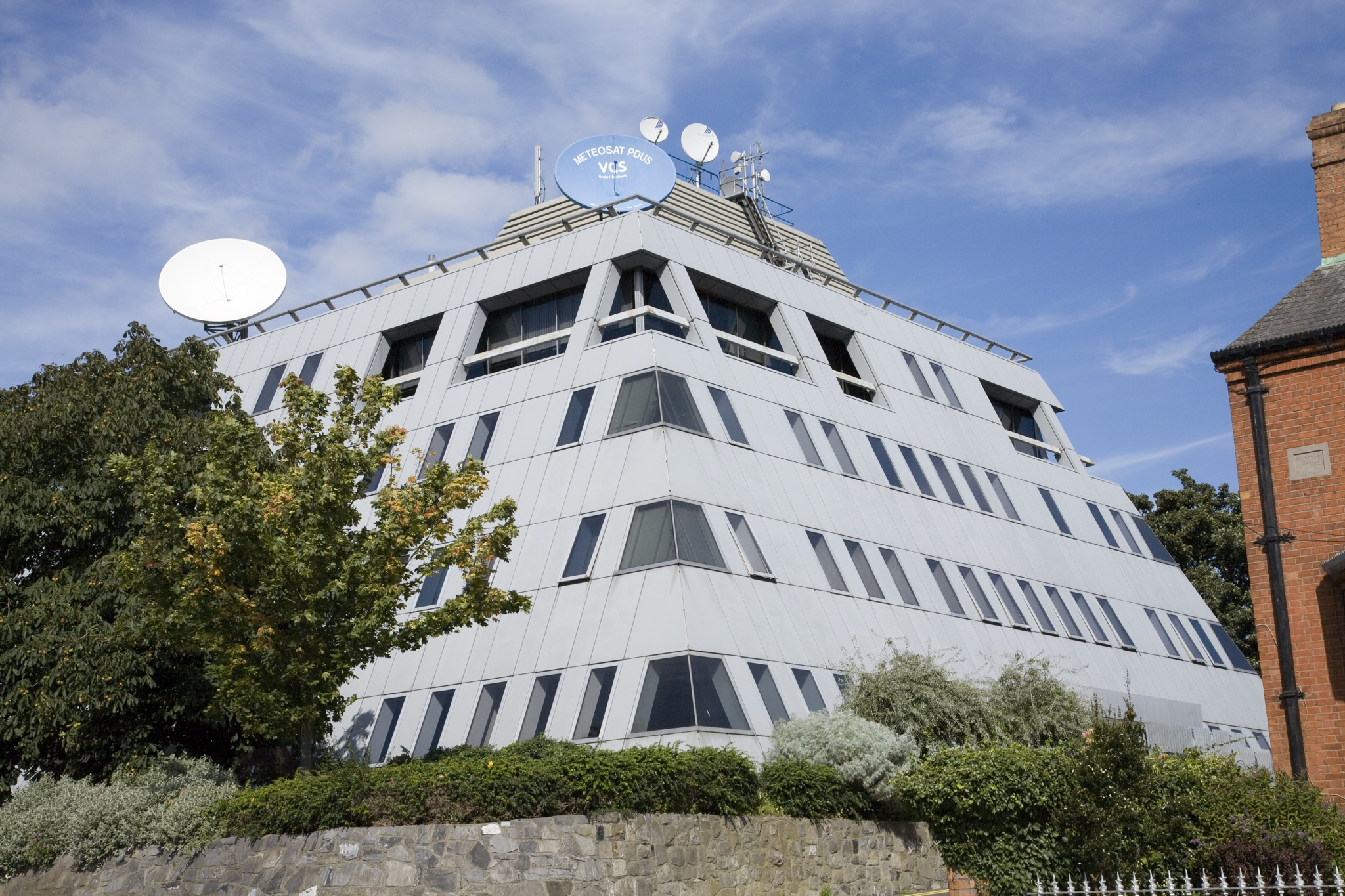
Met Éireann headquarters, Glasnevin by Liam McCormick (1979)

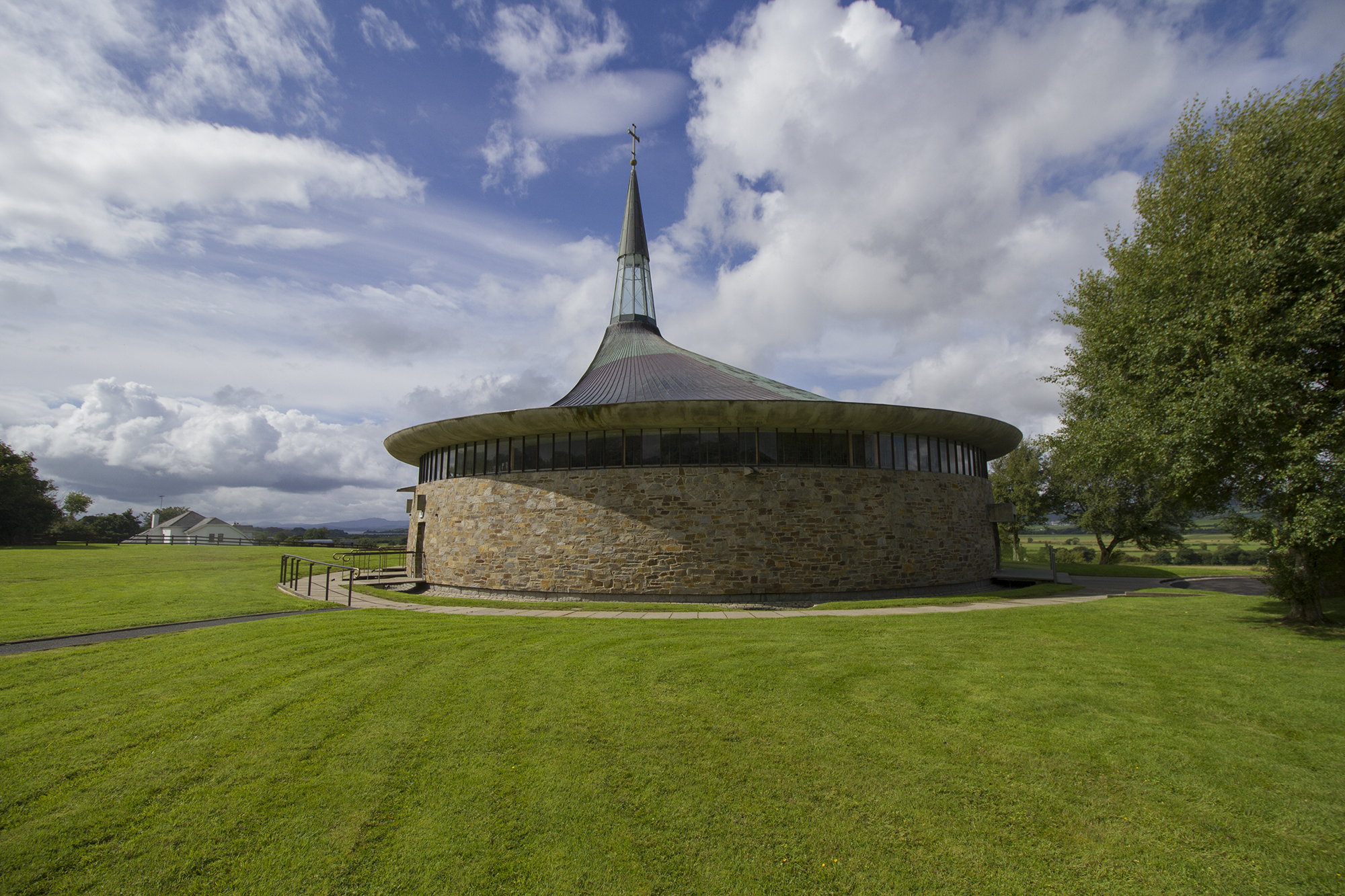
St Aengus' Chapel, Burt, Co. Donegal by Liam McCormick (1967)

In 1987, the government started to plan what is now known as the IFSC kickstarting a radical redevelopment of the Dublin Docklands which was to continue through to the 21st century. The complex today houses over 14,000 office workers. In 2010, the Convention Centre Dublin designed by Pritzker Prize winning architect Kevin Roche was completed at Spencer Dock. From the 2010s and onwards, several new mid to high-rise buildings have been erected in Dublin, such as Capital Dock, The Exo Building and College Square.

One of the most iconic structures of modern Irish architecture is the Spire of Dublin designed by Ian Ritchie Architects. Completed in January 2003, the structure was nominated in 2004 for the prestigious Stirling Prize.

Other Irish buildings to be nominated for the Stirling Prize include the Ranelagh Multi-Denominational School, Ranelagh, Dublin (1999), the Lewis Glucksman Gallery, Cork (2005), and An Gaeláras, Derry (2011) by O'Donnell & Tuomey, the Millennium Wing, National Gallery of Ireland by Benson & Forsyth (2002), the medical school at University of Limerick by Grafton Architects (2013), and the Giant's Causeway Visitors' Centre, County Antrim by heneghan peng architects (2013).

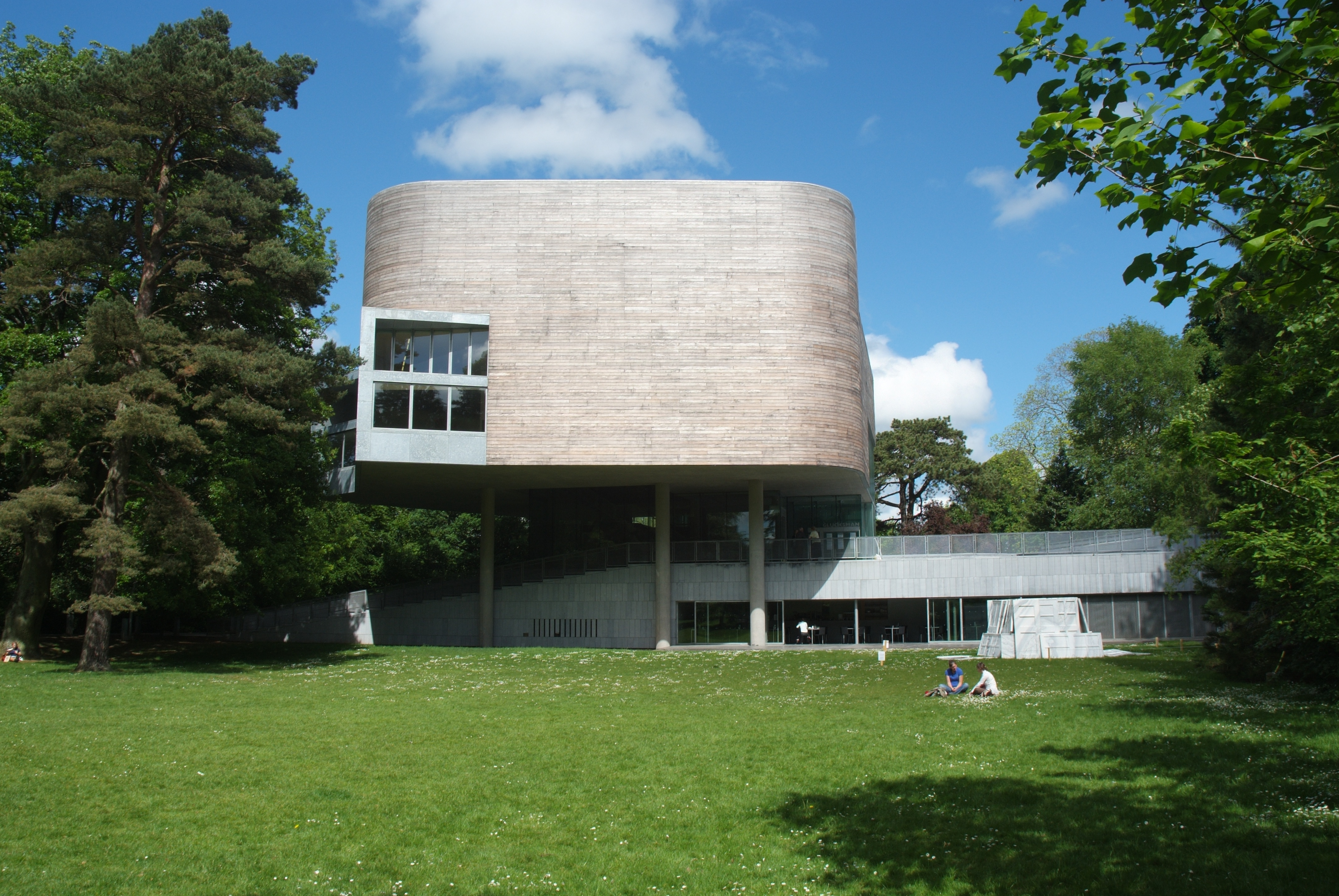
Lewis Glucksman Gallery, Cork by O'Donnell & Tuomey (2005)

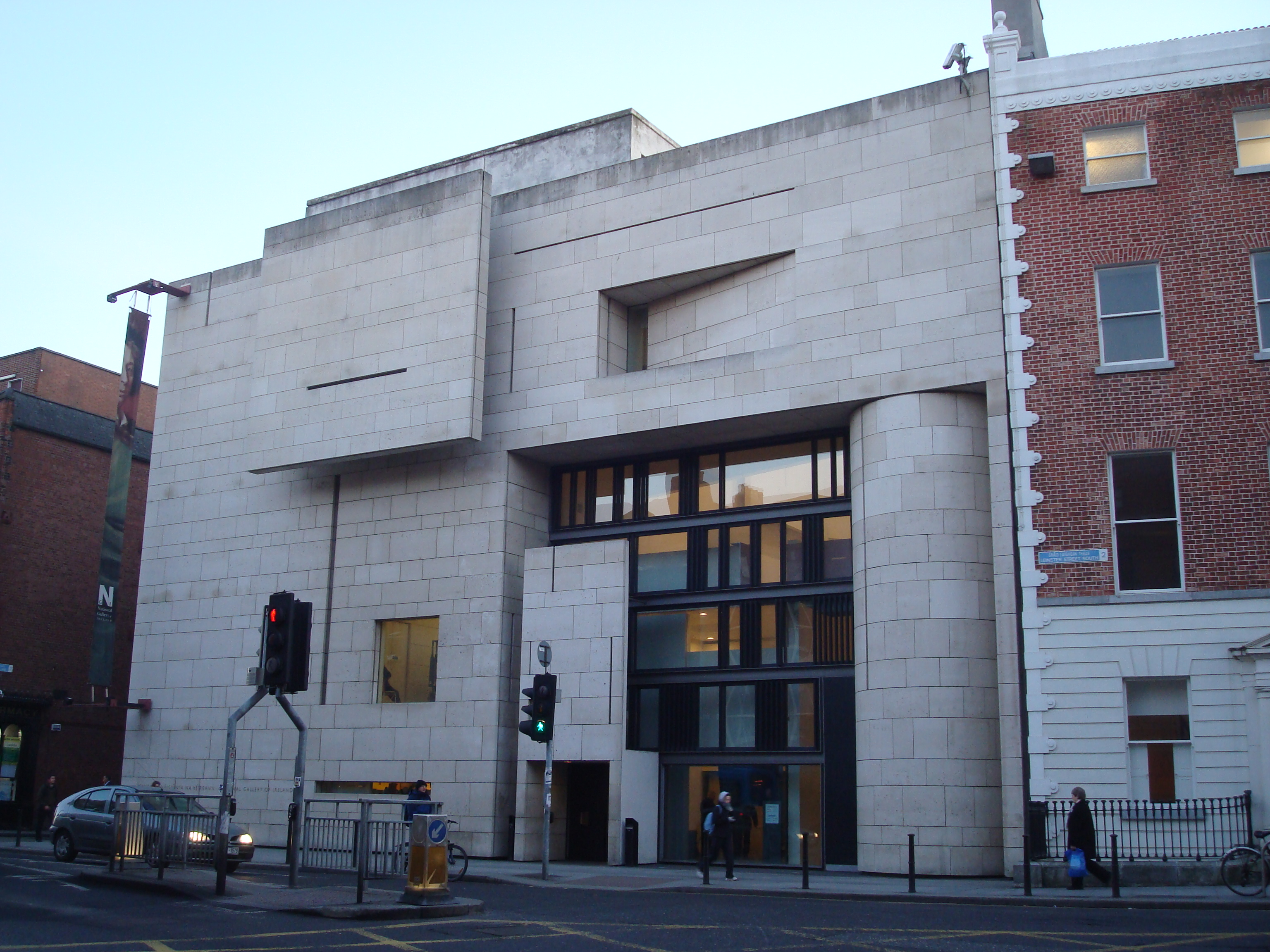
Millenium Wing, National Gallery of Ireland by Benson & Forsyth (2002)

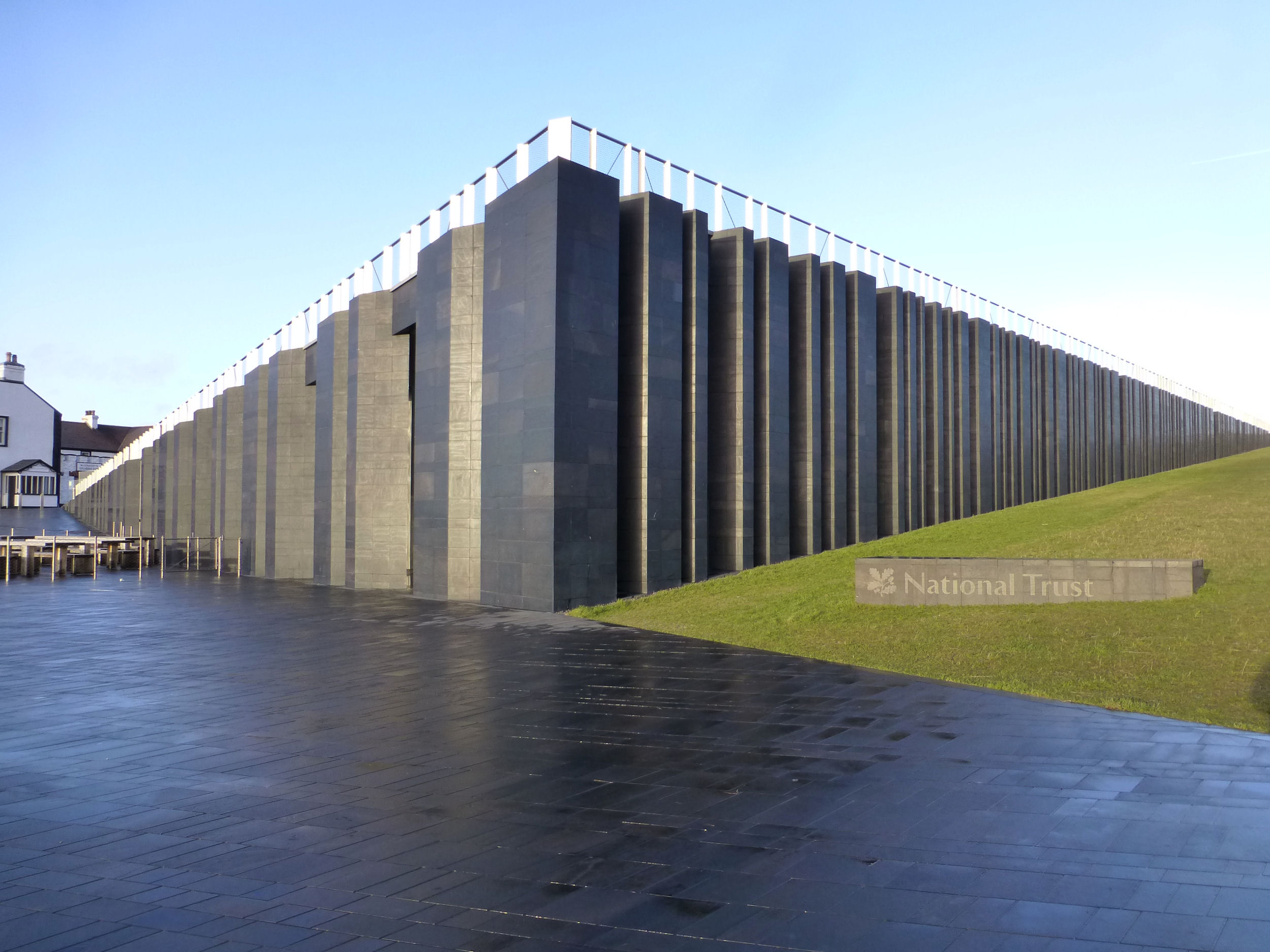
Giant's Causeway Visitors' Centre by heneghan peng architects (2013)

Röntgen Building, Bocconi University, Milan by Grafton Architects (2007)

Irish architects who have won the Stirling Prize for work in the UK include Grafton Architects for the Kingston University Town House, London (2021) and Níall McLaughlin for the New Library, Magdalene College, Cambridge (2022).

In 2020, Shelley McNamara and Yvonne Farrell became only the second Irish winners of the Pritzker Prize (after Kevin Roche). Their Röntgen Building at Bocconi University, Milan (completed in 2007) was awarded the 2008 World Building of the Year Award.

== Vernacular architecture ==
The thatched roof cottage and blackhouse have a tradition dating back 9,000 years. Now considered quaint, thatched cottages are often rented out for tourists on holidays. A characteristically exuberant vernacular expression is often found in shopfronts throughout Ireland. Patrick O'Donovan has observed that in the nineteenth century there was "a brilliant explosion" of domestic architecture borne of the opportunities that plate glass, Art Nouveau and classical and gothic themes all offered up at the time. "In Ireland", he wrote, "the villages were not the places where people lived, but where they came for supplies and, most regularly, to attend church. Yet the shops did almost everything that the Church could not do, and offered an alternative, perhaps, to the latter's solemnity."

== See also ==
- Architectural Association of Ireland
- Architecture of Belfast
- Architecture of Limerick
- Fortified houses in Ireland
- Georgian Dublin
- Irish Architectural Archive
- List of Irish towns with a Market House
- List of tallest buildings in Ireland
- Listed buildings in Northern Ireland
- Passage tombs in Ireland
- Royal Institute of the Architects of Ireland

== Bibliography ==
- Becker, Annette, and Wilfried Wang. 20th-century Architecture: Ireland. Prestel: 1997. ISBN 3-7913-1719-9.
- Craig, Maurice. Dublin 1660–1860. Allen Figgis: 1980. ISBN 0-900372-91-5.
- McParland, Edward. A New Way of Building: Public Architecture in Ireland, 1680–1760. Yale University Press: 2001. ISBN 0-300-09064-1.
- Dennison, Gabriel, and Baibre Ni Fhloinn. Traditional Architecture in Ireland. Royal Irish Academy: 1994. ISBN 1-898473-09-9.
- McCullough, Niall. A Lost Tradition: The Nature of Architecture in Ireland. Gandon Editions: 1987. ISBN 0-946641-03-X.
