= List of Irish towns with a Market House =

See:

- Market houses in Northern Ireland
- List of market houses in the Republic of Ireland
