= Miss Scarlet and The Duke =

British-American period crime television drama

- Also known as: Miss Scarlet (Series 5 onwards)
- Genre: Crime drama; Historical drama
- Created by: Rachael New
- Starring: Kate Phillips; Stuart Martin (series 1-4); Ansu Kabia; Cathy Belton; Tom Durant-Pritchard (series 5-)
- Countries of origin: United Kingdom; United States
- Original language: English
- No. of series: 6
- No. of episodes: 36

Production
- Executive producers: Todd Berger; Patrick Irwin; Jin Ishimoto; Patty Ishimoto; Harvey Myman; Rachael New; Declan O'Dwyer (series 1); Kate Phillips (series 4-); Stuart Martin (series 4)
- Producers: Aaron Farrell (series 1); Patty Ishimoto - Series producer (series 4-)
- Production locations: Ireland (series 1); Serbia (series 2– )
- Running time: 60 minutes
- Production companies: Element 8 Entertainment; A+E Networks UK; GBH Boston; Shinawil (series 1); 87 Films (series 2– ); Other Mans Shoes (series 4– ); Work in Progress (series 4– )

Original release
- Network: Alibi (UK/Ireland); PBS (US)
- Release: 31 March 2020 – present

Miss Scarlet (titled Miss Scarlet and The Duke in series 1–4) is a British-American period television crime drama created by Rachael New. It stars Kate Phillips (Eliza Scarlet) as the title character, a Victorian era private detective.

The first series debuted on Alibi in the United Kingdom on 31 March 2020, and premiered in the United States on 17 January 2021, as part of PBS's Masterpiece anthology series. A second series was announced by PBS on 29 March 2021. It premiered on Alibi in the UK on 14 June 2022, and on PBS in the US on 16 October 2022. Series three, four, five, and six all first premiered on PBS, with series 3 on 8 January 2023; series 4 on 7 January 2024; series 5 on 12 January 2025; and series 6 on 7 December 2025. Series 5 marked a turnover for the series: Stuart Martin had departed the show in series 4, and his character William "the Duke" Wellington was written out. The show was retitled "Miss Scarlet" as a result. Tom Durant-Pritchard took a replacement role as Inspector Alexander Blake.

A seventh series is in production and as of March 2026, it is expected to be the final series of the show.

== Plot and characters ==
In Victorian London, 1882, Eliza Scarlet is left almost penniless when her father, Henry, unexpectedly dies. Although marriage would appear to be her only option for financial security, Eliza resolves to take over her father's private detective agency alone, working under his name. Struggling to build her reputation in the male-dominated world of crime-solving, she frequently calls on her childhood friend William Wellington, a gruff Scottish detective inspector of Scotland Yard, for assistance.

William is known in the police force as "The Duke" or simply "Duke", a nickname referring to the Duke of Wellington. Eliza's late father Henry saved William from the London streets after he arrived from Glasgow as a child and later mentored him as he trained as a policeman. As a result, William looked up to Henry as a father figure. William once kissed Eliza following her dog's death, which he characterises as "a chaste kiss," to her annoyance. Though he is irritated by Eliza's detective aspirations, he cares for her and gradually begins to show respect for her skills.

Eliza also befriends Rupert Parker, a wealthy man who provides her with direly needed loans. Rupert is the bachelor (and secretly gay) son of Mrs. Parker, a rich landlady who owns Eliza's home, and relies on Eliza's advice to navigate his personal life. Eliza lives with her housekeeper, Ivy Woods, who helped raise her after Eliza's mother died (some time before the series begins). Eliza and William bicker and argue constantly but also share moments of subtle flirtation and care for each other deeply.

Series writer and creator Rachael New took inspiration for Eliza's character from Elizabeth Bennet, the heroine of Jane Austen's Pride and Prejudice. Born into a middle-class family, Eliza uses her appearance as a refined Victorian lady to her advantage; both clients and suspects underestimate her, and she frequently relies on this, her wits, and her father's training to solve cases. William and Eliza work on several cases together, though she is uncredited, causing disputes between them. Eliza also relies on a Jamaican criminal, Moses, for help dealing with the dangerous underworld of London. Moses is amused by Eliza's gumption, and they connect as outsiders to society.

== Cast ==
=== Overview ===
Actor	Character	Series					
Actor	Character	1	2	3	4	5	6
Kate Phillips	Eliza Scarlet	Main	Main	Main	Main	Main	Main
Stuart Martin	William "Duke" Wellington	Main	Main	Main	Main		
Ansu Kabia	Moses Valentine	Main	Main	Main			Guest
Cathy Belton	Ivy Woods	Main	Main	Main	Main	Main	Main
Simon Ludders	Barnabus Potts	Recurring	Regular	Regular	Regular	Regular	Regular
Helen Norton	Mrs Parker	Recurring	Recurring			Recurring	
Kevin Doyle	Henry Scarlet	Regular					
Andrew Gower	Rupert Parker	Regular					
Danny Midwinter	Frank Jenkins	Regular					
Nick Dunning	Stirling	Regular					
Richard Evans	Herr Hildegard	Regular					
Jessie Cave	Harriet "Hattie" Parker		Regular				
Ian Pirie	Monro		Regular	Regular			
Evan McCabe	Oliver Fitzroy		Regular	Regular	Regular	Regular	
Tim Chipping	Charlie Phelps		Regular	Regular	Regular	Regular	Guest
Felix Scott	Patrick Nash		Recurring	Regular	Regular	Regular	
Brian Bovell	Solomon		Recurring	Recurring			
Laura Rollins	Clementine		Recurring	Recurring			
Oliver Chris	Basil Sinclaire		Recurring	Recurring	Recurring		
Paul Bazely	Clarence Pettigrew				Regular	Regular	Regular
Tom Durant Pritchard	Alexander Blake					Main	Main
Sam Buchanan	Detective George Willows						Regular
Grace Hogg-Robinson	Isabel Summers						Regular

=== Detective agency ===
- Kate Phillips as Eliza Scarlet, an ambitious young woman who takes over her late father's detective agency
  - Laura Marcus as young Eliza Scarlet
- Ansu Kabia as Moses Valentine, a Jamaican British petty criminal whom Eliza frequently hires as an assistant, informant, or debt collector (series 1–3, guest series 6)
- Kevin Doyle as Henry Scarlet (series 1), Eliza's father and William's mentor
- Andrew Gower as Rupert Parker (series 1), Eliza's friend and investor
- Paul Bazely as Clarence (regular, series 4–present) a bookkeeper employed by Patrick Nash and later employed by Eliza

=== Police officials ===
- Stuart Martin as William "Duke" Wellington (series 1–4), a detective inspector with the Metropolitan Police
  - Matt Olsen as young William "Duke" Wellington
- Simon Ludders as Barnabus Potts (series 1–2; guest, series 3–), a city coroner, who antagonises Eliza but later romantically pursues Ivy
- Matthew Malone as Clarence Honeychurch (series 1), a police constable
- Danny Midwinter as Frank Jenkins (series 1), William's assistant, a detective sergeant
- Nick Dunning as Superintendent Stirling (series 1), William's supervisor
- Ian Pirie as Superintendent Monro (series 2–3), Stirling's successor
- Evan McCabe as Oliver Fitzroy (series 2–5), a new and untested detective, and the son of the police commissioner
- Tim Chipping as DS Charlie Phelps (series 2–5, guest series 6), a harsh colleague of William's, temporarily replaces William following his departure for America
- Tom Durant Pritchard as Alexander Blake (series 5), a former soldier turned inspector who (permanently) replaces William following his departure for America
- Sam Buchanan as Detective George Willows (series 6), a new inspector brought in after both Phelps and Fitzroy have transferred

=== Associates ===
- Cathy Belton as Ivy Woods, Eliza's housekeeper who later gets a job as an administrative assistant at the police station
- Richard Evans as Herr Hildegard (series 1), a funeral director who works near Eliza's office
- Amy McAllister as Tilly Hildegard (series 1), Herr Hildegard's German niece, who pursues and eventually marries Rupert
- Jessie Cave as Harriet "Hattie" Parker (series 2), Mrs Parker's niece and companion
- Felix Scott as Patrick Nash (recurring, series 2; regular, series 3– ), another private detective
- Brian Bovell as Solomon (guest, series 2; regular, series 3), a shopkeeper specialising in exotic poisons
- Sophie Robertson as Arabella Acaster (series 3), an old schoolmate who bullied Eliza as a child
- Helen Norton as Mrs Parker (recurring, series 1–2, 5), Eliza's landlady and Rupert's mother
- Oliver Chris as Basil Sinclaire (recurring, series 2–4), a journalist specialising in sensational crime stories
- Laura Rollins as Clementine (recurring, series 2–3), a sex worker and friend of Moses', occasionally hired by Eliza for various tasks
- Grace Hogg-Robinson as Isabel Summers (series 6), a new administrative assistant at the police station

== Episodes ==
=== Series overview ===
Series	Episodes	Originally released	
Series	Episodes	First released	Last released
1	6	31 March 2020	5 May 2020
2	6	14 June 2022	19 July 2022
3	6	8 January 2023	12 February 2023
4	6	7 January 2024	11 February 2024
5	6	15 January 2025	16 February 2025
6	6	11 January 2026	15 February 2026

=== Series 1 (2020) ===
No.	Title	Directed by	Written by	Original release date (Note: Series 1 and 2 were first broadcast in the UK on Alibi. These are the airdates shown here.)
1	"Inheritance"	Declan O'Dwyer	Rachael New	31 March 2020
After the death of her ailing private detective father, Eliza Scarlet is forced to take on a missing persons case to pay his debts, but the investigation is complicated when she realizes that her client is a seasoned con man who manipulated her to gain control of his wife's inheritance. With the aid of her father's old protégé, Detective Inspector William "Duke" Wellington, and local criminal Moses Valentine, Eliza proves that her client is a bigamist and apprehends him, enabling his wife to regain her inheritance and her freedom.
2	"The Woman in Red"	Declan O'Dwyer	Rachael New	7 April 2020
Eliza's landlady, enraged by the former's refusal to marry her son and her encouraging him to move out, calls in the unpaid lease on the home she's lived in all her life. Eliza is hired to investigate a murder, only to discover that the dead man committed suicide and that the accused murderer, who has confessed, actually was framed by his wife after she uncovered his homosexuality. With help from Moses, she obtains the necessary evidence to clear the man's name seconds before his execution. Eliza subsequently hires Moses to collect payment from a difficult former client and pays off the lease in full.
3	"Deeds Not Words"	Declan O'Dwyer	Rachael New	14 April 2020
Duke hires Eliza to go undercover and infiltrate a women's suffrage group campaigning for the vote. When a dead body turns up on the doorstep of one of the group leaders, the woman appears at Eliza’s office, claims the man she killed had physically abused her, and challenges Eliza to join at a planned protest. Eliza’s assistance, albeit reluctant, helps Duke stop the woman from planting a bomb in a prestigious men’s club, but he does not inform his superiors of her contribution to the successful result.
4	"Memento Mori"	Declan O'Dwyer	Ben Edwards	21 April 2020
After realising that Duke is taking the credit for cases that she herself has solved, Eliza is put in touch with a death photographer who seems to be receiving bizarre and threatening messages from beyond the grave. The investigation uncovers a fraudulent medium but finds a solution closer to home than expected. She later discovers a secret hidden in her father's office.
5	"Cell 99"	Declan O'Dwyer	Ben Edwards	28 April 2020
Eliza's discovery of her father's casebook leads her to an abandoned prison on the outskirts of London. She and William investigate what seems like an empty building, but they soon discover that it is being used by a criminal gang that is carrying out a major forgery operation and appears to have been involved in the death of Eliza's father.
6	"The Case of Henry Scarlet"	Declan O'Dwyer	Rachael New	5 May 2020
William pursues information about the forgery ring and tries to keep Eliza from leaving the safety of her home. A tip leads William to discover a stash of forged documents in Moses's room, but Eliza refuses to believe his involvement. When the gang leader proves to be someone within the police department, William and Eliza are held at gunpoint together before a well-timed rescue.

=== Series 2 (2022) ===
No. overall	No. in series	Title	Directed by	Written by	Original release date
7	1	"Pandora's Box"	Steve Hughes	Rachael New	14 June 2022
Eliza is hired to investigate the disappearance of a young woman who works at Wentworth's department store: a case which has already been closed by Duke. The murder of a former co-worker of the missing woman leads Eliza to discover that the female employees are paid extra to spend time with rich men, including the owner of the store. Police department politics saddle William with an incompetent young detective.
8	2	"The Black Witch Moth"	Steve Hughes	Rachael New	21 June 2022
Eliza is hired by an insurance company to investigate the theft of a rare sketch by Charles Darwin and is mystified to discover that a newspaper advertisement offering a reward for return of the sketch was placed before the robbery occurred. The case becomes more complicated when she finds that the insurance company that hired her doesn't exist.
9	3	"A Pauper's Grave"	Steve Hughes	Rachael New	28 June 2022
When Eliza's mother's ring is found the city morgue, she is accused of breaking in and stealing files. Similar break-ins have taken place at additional morgues, and the stolen files appear to apply to bodies buried in pauper's graves, some subsequently dug up by grave robbers. With Eliza in hiding, William and Moses have to work together to clear her name by identifying the real thief and the reason behind the unusual thefts,
10	4	"Angel of Inferno"	Ivan Zivkovic	Rachael New	5 July 2022
Eliza is hired by a quack doctor to investigate a blackmailer's threat to poison his popular patent medicine. Meanwhile, rival private detective Patrick Nash threatens to put Eliza out of business if she doesn't join his agency.
11	5	"Quarter to Midnight"	Ivan Zivkovic	Ben Edwards	12 July 2022
Duke is offered a promotion to chief inspector that would require him to transfer to Glasgow. Eliza discovers that two murders were staged to match a scene from a crime novel, and both victims were associates of the author.
12	6	"The Proposal"	Ivan Zivkovic	Ben Edwards and Rachael New	19 July 2022
After rival detective Nash is injured in an apparent murder attempt, he hires Eliza to find the man responsible. But it turns out that she was the gunman's target. Forced to accept the position in Glasgow, Duke struggles to train the unassuming Oliver Fitzroy, the police commissioner's son, as his replacement.

=== Series 3 (2023) ===
No. overall	No. in series	Title	Directed by	Written by	Original release date (Note: Series 3-6 were first broadcast in the US on PBS. These are the airdates shown here.)
13	1	"The Vanishing"	Steve Hughes	Rachael New (story by Rachael New & Ben Edwards)	8 January 2023
William tries to quash the leaking of case information to the press. Eliza is hired by a tabloid newspaper to investigate the disappearance of a magician during his act; but when the man's body is pulled from the Thames, she and William find themselves competing to investigate the murder.
14	2	"Arabella's"	Steve Hughes	Sarah-Louise Hawkins	15 January 2023
William and Eliza investigate a series of thefts at a local restaurant. Eliza encounters her childhood enemy Arabella Acaster, who owns the restaurant, and comes to suspect that she is involved in the crimes.
15	3	"Hotel St Marc"	Rachael New	Ben Edwards (story by Rachael New & Ben Edwards)	22 January 2023
Eliza tracks down conman Charles Percival, whose latest scheme defrauded victims betting on the Grand National horse race, to a remote hotel in France. But rival detective Patrick Nash is also there, and the two investigators have detained different men whom they each believe to be Percival.
16	4	"Bloodline"	Ivan Zivkovic	Ben Edwards (story by Rachael New & Ben Edwards)	29 January 2023
Detective Fitzroy hires Eliza to look into a case of police corruption after he sees Detective Phelps plant evidence on a suspect. With William away in Manchester, Phelps has taken over the investigation of a series of robberies, but Eliza finds an unexpected reason why Phelps is implicating an innocent man.
17	5	"The Heir"	Steve Hughes	Dan Muirden	5 February 2023
Eliza is on the verge of earning life-changing money when she offers to help the heir to an unclaimed fortune; but the heir is kidnapped one day before his claim must be filed. In addition, she finds herself perturbed by William's relationship with Arabella.
18	6	"The Jewel of the North"	Steve Hughes	Ben Edwards (story by Rachael New & Ben Edwards)	12 February 2023
Eliza, Nash, Moses, and William are all sent bombs in the post. A robbery has been committed on The Jewel of the North, a train running between London and Liverpool. Everyone must figure out who sent the bombs to them and how they are connected to the train robbery. Arabella forces William to face his true feelings for Eliza.

=== Series 4 (2024) ===
No. overall	No. in series	Title	Directed by	Written by	Original release date
19	1	"Elysium"	Nimer Rashed	Rachael New (story by Rachael New & Ben Edwards)	7 January 2024
Eliza has taken over the London office of Nash's agency. However, all but one of the employees have left in protest, as have the clients. She helps William investigate a robbery and the shooting of a prominent government official at an "elite gentlemen's club" (a brothel).
20	2	"Six Feet Under"	Nimer Rashed	Sarah-Louise Hawkins	14 January 2024
One of Mr Potts's friends is murdered, and he turns to Miss Scarlet because the police force is overwhelmed. Rivalry between funeral homes and family secrets feature in the solution. At the end of the episode, William is forced to raid a gang's house despite being short on men and is shot in the chest.
21	3	"Origins"	Rachael New	Ben Edwards (story by Rachael New & Ben Edwards)	21 January 2024
As William remains unconscious after the shooting, a flashback shows how he and Eliza first met, after her father brought home the then-homeless young man. Eliza maneuvered William into escorting her to a society party, where he spotted the man he witnessed committing a murder. Although Eliza was able to determine the motive behind the murder, she was frustrated that her father insisted she could not follow in his footsteps. At the end of the episode, William regains consciousness.
22	4	"The Diamond Feather"	Nimer Rashed	Rachael New (story by Rachael New & Ben Edwards)	28 January 2024
Nash returns to London and is furious at Eliza's handling of his agency. A diamond feather that belonged to Admiral Nelson has been stolen, and the two are hired to find it. At the end of the episode, William confesses his love to Eliza but announces he will leave to join a New York City police program for a year.
23	5	"The Calling"	Rachael New	Dan Muirden	4 February 2024
Eliza and Nash are still struggling to work together and cannot agree on a staff. They are hired to discover the cause of a gas explosion that killed three at a telephone company. After they solve the murder, Nash allows Eliza to choose whom to hire.
24	6	"The Fugitive"	Milos Kodemo	Ben Edwards (story by Rachael New & Ben Edwards)	11 February 2024
Nash is accused of murder and goes into hiding. The victim was one of Nash's informants, and the murderer turns out to be Sean O'Driscoll, who had killed Nash's brother years ago. Nash captures, shoots and injures O'Driscoll to prevent him from stabbing Eliza, but he is jailed and faces charges for the abduction of O'Driscoll and evading arrest. Phelps is promoted to head the division and take over William's role while he is in New York.

=== Series 5 (2025) ===
No. overall	No. in series	Title	Directed by	Written by	Original release date
25	1	"The Rival"	Ivan Zivkovic	Rachael New & Ben Edwards	12 January 2025
Eliza receives word that Inspector Wellington was offered permanent employment and will be staying in New York. She meets his replacement, Alexander Blake, a no-nonsense inspector from Bristol who doesn't work with private detectives. Detective Phelps had originally put her on a case of a missing lord, who was suspected of murder. Inspector Blake tells her she is removed from the case, though she continues to investigate, to Blake's irritation. She meets with Patrick Nash in prison and discusses her future in London.
26	2	"The Guild"	Milos Kodemo	Rachael New & Ben Edwards	19 January 2025
Eliza is drawn into the investigation of the murder of the chairman of the Guild of the Private Detectives. When Eliza offers her services to Inspector Blake, he hires her to interview applicants for new departmental clerks instead. She and Clarence find a connection between one of the applicants and another private detective with whom Eliza has dealt before and who was running against the murdered chairman in the upcoming election. Eliza meets Inspector Blake's child, Sophia, when she goes to his home.
27	3	"The Thames Reaper"	Ivan Zivkovic	Rachael New & Ben Edwards	26 January 2025
A notorious serial killer known as the Thames Reaper, who drowns victims in the murky depths of the Thames, is back after a year of silence. Eliza is caught in a clash between Fleet Street and Scotland Yard. Inspector Blake reluctantly brings her onto his team, and they find the case is not as it seems. Ivy, feeling overwhelmed by her new job on the Scotland Yard clerical staff, resists Mr.Potts' efforts to set their wedding date.
28	4	"The Deal"	Ivan Zivkovic	Rachael New & Ben Edwards	2 February 2025
Imprisoned private detective Patrick Nash is released early from his criminal sentence at the behest of Lord Campbell but with strings attached. His benefactor wants Nash to find his missing brother, who is indebted to the leader of a dangerous criminal gang. After some coaching by Nash, Clarence uses his skills at bluffing for more than just poker. Eliza investigates a fraudster who seems to have scammed money from Mrs. Parker and gives Nash a temporary place in her office. The two seemingly unrelated cases soon converge.
29	5	"The Enchanted Mirror"	Ivan Zivkovic	Rachael New & Ben Edwards	9 February 2025
Abraham Barratt, a composer of popular operettas, is murdered in the theatre. Inspector Blake considers his partner Amil Kapoor the prime suspect. Barratt's safe is found empty, and the manuscript for his most recent operetta, "The Enchanted Mirror", is missing. Eliza is hired to investigate by the victim's wife, who was having an affair with Kapoor. Detective Phelps struggles with alcohol and is removed from the case, but he mounts his own investigation.
30	6	"Dangerous Liaisons"	Ivan Zivkovic	Rachael New & Ben Edwards	16 February 2025
Against the advice of everyone, Eliza takes up an investigation into Police Commissioner Fitzroy at the behest of his wife. Mrs. Fitzroy knows he is lying about something and suspects an affair. Events quickly spiral out of control, as Oliver Fitzroy is beaten by unknown assailants. Eliza finds herself caught between two secretive factions, both of which are closely watching the Commissioner's activities. The wedding of Ivy and Mr. Potts takes place.

=== Series 6 (2026) ===
No. overall	No. in series	Title	Directed by	Written by	Original release date (Note: Series 6 will be released for early streaming via PBS Passport and the PBS app on December 7, 2025, with the official broadcast debut on Masterpiece on PBS starting January 11, 2026.)	PBS Broadcast Date
31	1	"Secrets and Lies"	Ivan Zivkovic	Rachael New & Ben Edwards	7 December 2025	11 January 2026
Two women – both patients of the same physician – are found dead, apparently poisoned by a medication he prescribed. Blake enlists Eliza’s help to investigate. With both Detectives Fitzroy and Phelps having been transferred, Detective George Willows joins the Scotland Yard force.
32	2	"Trafalgar Spring"	Ivan Zivkovic	Rachael New & Ben Edwards	7 December 2025	18 January 2026
The scandal surrounding the divorce of Lord and Lady Roberts deepens when their champion racehorse vanishes. The settlement had awarded the horse to Lady Roberts; but then her trainer is found murdered near Lord Roberts's stable, and a ransom demand threatens the life of the horse.
33	3	"The Delivery"	Ivan Zivkovic	Rachael New & Ben Edwards	7 December 2025	25 January 2026
A treasure hunt brings Moses back to London from Paris to sell a priceless diamond, at the direction of Patrick Nash. As Eliza welcomes Moses back to the fold, Clarence is determined to prove that he is every bit as good as his predecessor and a friendly rivalry ensues.
34	4	"Bad Blood"	Ivan Zivkovic	Rachael New & Ben Edwards	7 December 2025	1 February 2026
Charlie Phelps hires Eliza for a case involving his uncle, Dylan Cooper; it turns out that Scotland Yard is also after Cooper, putting Eliza in the middle.
35	5	"The Night Shift"	Rachael New	Rachael New & Ben Edwards	7 December 2025	8 February 2026
Dylan Cooper is caught and held in the cells at Scotland Yard. Blake and detective Willows face a long night, as Dylan’s gang plots a daring escape while the Yard is seriously understaffed because of illness sweeping through the force.
36	6	"The Line of Duty"	Ivan Zivkovic	Rachael New & Ben Edwards	7 December 2025	15 February 2026
Eliza and Inspector Blake are asked by secret service agent "the Governess" to investigate the mysterious death of a Foreign Office minister. New rules being implemented at Scotland Yard threaten their ability to work together on future cases.

== Production ==
The first series was filmed in Dublin, Ireland, with exteriors of Eliza's home shot on Mount Pleasant Square, Ranelagh. The distinctive green dome of Mary Immaculate, Refuge of Sinners Church, Rathmines is visible in some street scenes. The police station where the Duke works is in fact the CBS Westland Row in Cumberland Street.

As of series 2, production moved to Belgrade, Serbia, where it remains as of series 5.

== Broadcast ==
The first series began broadcasting on Alibi in the United Kingdom on 31 March 2020, and premiered in the United States on 17 January 2021, as part of PBS's Masterpiece anthology series.

A second series was announced by PBS on 29 March 2021. It first aired on Alibi in the UK on 14 June 2022, and later on PBS in the US on 16 October 2022.

Miss Scarlet and The Duke was later renewed for series three and four. Series three premiered on PBS on 8 January 2023 with weekly installments, though all episodes were made available via the membership video-on-demand service PBS Passport on 24 November 2022. Episodes were also released weekly on Amazon Prime Video's PBS Masterpiece subscription channel beginning 24 November 2022. Series four premiered on PBS on 7 January 2024 with weekly installments, and all episodes made available that day via PBS Passport.

The renewal announcement for series five also mentioned that actor Stuart Martin would be leaving the series, and his character William "The Duke" Wellington would be written off the show. As a result the show would be renamed Miss Scarlet starting with the fifth series. Stuart Martin had made the decision himself to leave the show as he felt Miss Scarlet was being held back by The Duke's presence in her life, and the show had taken The Duke's character as far as he could go within the series and that Scarlet's character could "explore new stories and challenges for now." The creators said they chose not to kill Martin's character off because "we just thought it would be too final, too cruel for Eliza, for the audience, and quite frankly, would limit our options for the show going forward, I think. But at this point in their lives, I think Duke and Eliza aren't ready to be together."

== Reception ==
Kristen Lopez in IndieWire wrote about the first season: "What makes "Miss Scarlet and the Duke" work so well is what feels like brevity. In five episodes, 50-minutes each, there’s a breathless quality to its blend of mystery-of-the-week and an overarching story. ... Phillips’ performance is so enthralling it brings thrills on its own and enhances everyone else’s work." Alistair McKay of the The Standard wrote: "Created by Trollied writer Rachael New, Miss Scarlet Etc is that very modern thing, a genre piece in a feminist bonnet, delivered in a tone that stays expertly on the chaste side of parody, while not taking itself entirely seriously."

Commenting on the sixth season, after the series had been retitled Miss Scarlet, Nicky Morris of Hello! wrote: "if you love twisty mysteries, slow-burn romance and a stylish and moody London setting, then it could be worth putting on your watchlist."
