= Gerard Byrne (artist, born 1958) =

Irish figurative painter

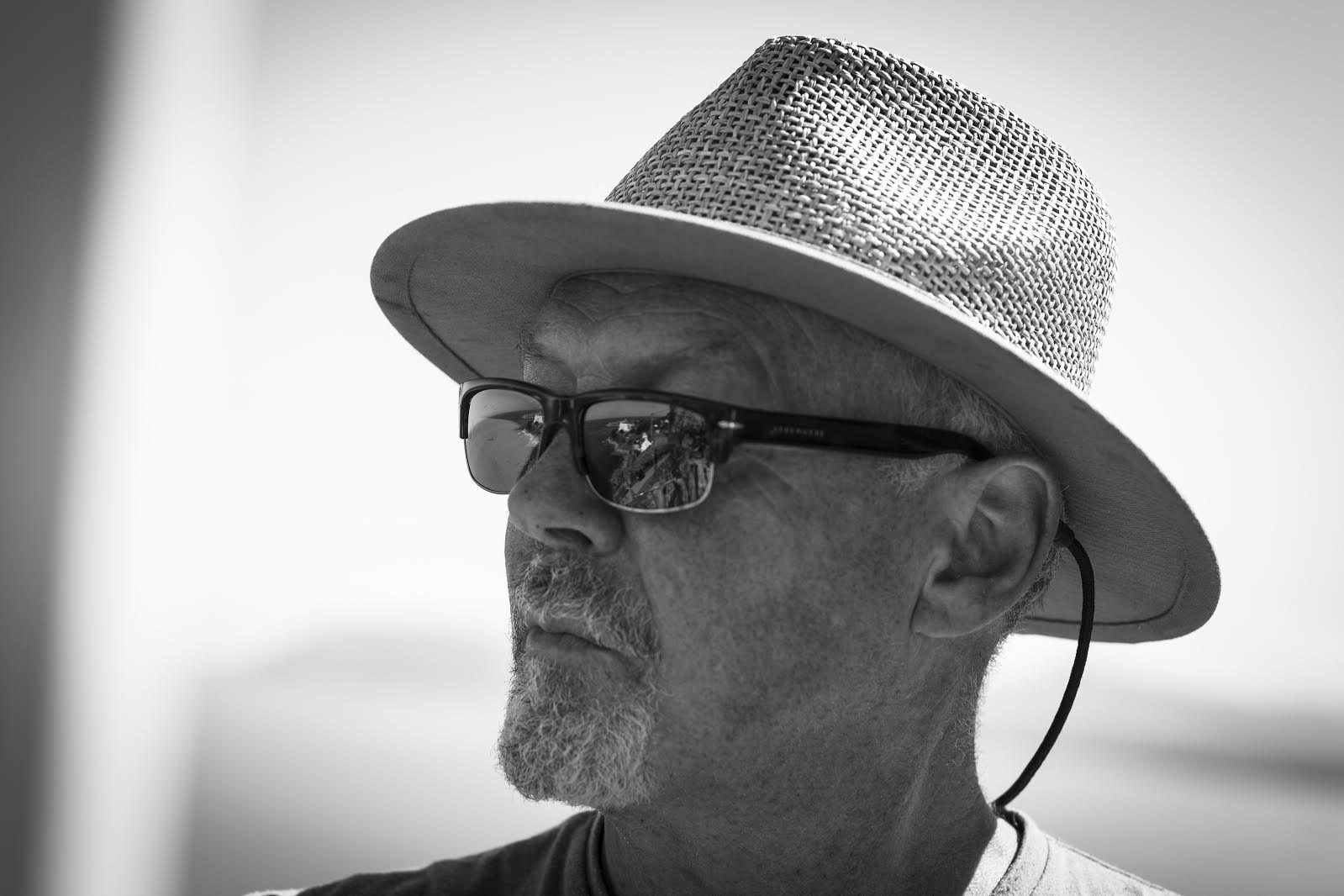
- Gerard Byrne, July 2015
- Born: 29 March 1958 (age 68); Dublin, Ireland
- Education: self-taught artist
- Occupations: artist, painter
- Known for: oil paintings, charcoal drawings, en plein air painter, landscapes, figurative, floral, still life
- Spouse: Agata Byrne
- Parent(s): Brendan and Kathleen Byrne
- Website: www.gerardbyrneartist.com

Gerard Byrne (born 29 March 1958, in Dublin) is an Irish figurative painter. His artwork encompasses various themes from landscapes and architecture painted both in his native Ireland and on foreign travels, through still life to the floral and figurative works.

== Biography ==
=== Early years ===
Gerard Byrne was born in Finglas, Dublin, Ireland, to parents Brendan and Kathleen. His father worked for many years as a self-employed customs agent, while his mother "Kay" reared the family of six: Brendan, Miriam, Gerard, Pauline, Janette and Irene. He attended the Sacred Heart school in Glasnevin, then the City Quay School and the St Kevin's Christian Brothers in Ballygall. Unrecognised and untreated dyslexia prevented him from making the most out of the school education. However his artistic talents had been recognised, and from an early age he was encouraged to draw. He wanted to enter the art college but was too young at the time to be accepted. At the age of 14, he left school and got his first job at Clery's, a landmark department store on O'Connell Street, where he worked as a lift boy for 4 years.

Byrne made an attempt to enter an art college, but not having sufficient qualifications he got refused. Following his parents' advice to get a "real job" he started an apprenticeship as an electrician. It led him to obtain his dream job: a lighthouse technician. Between 1978 and 1982 he mastered the trade but the innate curiosity made him move on in his life. He decided to leave a well-paid pensionable post and in 1982 together with his best friend Fran organised a road trip to Australia in a vintage Volkswagen camper van. The two travelled across Europe but got stuck in Turkey when the visas to Iran had been refused due to the Iran–Iraq War. They made their way to Athens, sold the van in Greece and took a plane to Australia. The two hitchhiked around the continent and made their way to Darwin where both got jobs as flying electricians installing generators in aboriginal settlements. From Australia Gerard made his way back home via Asia, travelling through Indonesia, Burma, India and Russia mostly by train and then flew back from Moscow.

=== Towards life as an artist ===
Back in Dublin, Byrne continued working as an electrician taking various daytime jobs. The longing to be a painter became predominant though. Gradually he developed an idea to leave the recession-hit Ireland and travel to America to earn some money. His plan was to purchase an inexpensive house in an inner city and focus on becoming a full-time artist. Very determined to make his dream come true Gerard left for New York and worked tirelessly as an electrician for about two years. Upon his return to Dublin, he spent all his savings on a cheap flat in the Liberties. Committed to sticking to his plan he led a humble life and focused on drawing and painting. He would mostly spend time in the local market, painting the people and the local scenes. Gerard befriended local traders, who were supportive of his art and even fed him, often leaving boxes of fresh fruit and vegetables on his doorstep. Finding it hard to support himself he took an electrician job again. However, an electric shock that nearly killed him had a sobering effect. It made him fully realise that his true life ambition was to be an artist. By chance, he saw a documentary on the forthcoming changes in East Berlin and felt a strong need to be there to experience it. He decided to leave Ireland again.

=== Making it happen ===
In early 1989, Gerard packed his paint and canvas into an old camper van and left for Germany. Passing through Checkpoint Charlie in East Berlin he encountered the underground movement whose members had offered him to become an Artist-in-Residence. It was a major breakthrough, Byrne became a full-time artist. A few months later, in November 1989 the Berlin Wall came down. Seven months of working in the streets of Berlin, painting the local scenes and architecture resulted in a solo show of his works. An exhibition was organised undercover in a deteriorated, disused supermarket transformed for three weeks into an aesthetically pleasing art gallery called the People's Gallery. Although the theme of works was not politically charged the event itself was an act of freedom, a statement of the love of art and against the state interfering in the freedom of expression. Gerard stayed in Berlin through the unification process and shared the liberation experience with his new German friends.

== Art ==
=== Life as an artist ===
Upon a return to Ireland Gerard exhibited his Berlin artwork in the George Gallery in Dublin followed by regular exhibitions in other Dublin galleries. He returned to America, this time with the sole purpose of painting. In New York, he got cheap accommodation in the Spanish Harlem, a rough part of the city where he was the only white European and believed by the neighbours to be a cop undercover. When he came back to Dublin his New York work was presented in the Jo Rain Gallery. In 1996, he exhibited in the Harrison Gallery and took over the running of the gallery for the period of 2 years. Although very successful in managing it he realised he needed to decide whether he wanted to be a gallery owner or an artist creating his art. Once again he made a conscious decision to stick to the idea of being an artist.

In 2003, a relationship with the mother of his daughter Clara broke and he travelled to Dingle, the West Coast of Ireland to find solitude and much-needed inspiration. He stayed for a period of 3 months painting seascapes of Dingle Peninsula and Great Blasket Island and preparing for the group exhibition in Greenlane Gallery, Dingle to commemorate 50th anniversary of the last man leaving Great Blasket Island. As a result of his break up Gerard lost his only recently renovated home and studio in Sandycove. Shortly after he was offered by a complete stranger a basement to stay and work in a house in Killiney. To his great surprise, it happened to be a house with a sea view capturing his much loved Sorrento. He stayed there for three years. Over a short period of time, Gerard became close friends with the owner of the house, John. In 2005, Gerard made a painting trip to India and shortly after again to America. When he came home he focused on painting his beloved local Irish scenes: Dalkey, Killiney, Sorrento, Sandycove. His inspiration was fed by the beauty of the coastline, sea, light, local architecture and life. He became known as a local painter. In October 2007, Gerard flew to the USA once again, rented a camper van and drove upstate New York. He spent 6 weeks on the road capturing the colours of the fall. He came back with a number of big-format pictures depicting the autumnal landscapes. In 2005, he bought a house in Dalkey, with the idea of having a home to celebrate the arts, where music nights, poetry readings, classical music events, jazz concerts would complement his life as a painter. In time his home grew to become a gallery and was named The Art House. It became a recognised spot on the map of Dalkey, a place where the creative vibe dominated the structure of the house, run not for profit but for love of art, something he had learnt in Berlin a decade before. The Art House was situated in the heart of Dalkey village, directly opposite a well-known pub called Finnegan's which is featured in a number of Gerrard's paintings. It is here where in 2008, he met his future wife Agata, a Polish garden designer who was working as a waitress at the time. In August 2013, the artist opened The Gerard Byrne Studio in Dalkey hosting the reception of his wedding the following month. The gallery presented the artworks created over the previous years.

=== Life in Britain ===
In October 2014, Gerard moved to London and marked his arrival with a solo exhibition celebrating the opening of the Gerard Byrne Studio in Clerkenwell. His work focused on painting London landmarks en plein air and the new studio works. In October 2015 Gerard and Agata's move to Brighton provided the artist with an opportunity to capture the diminishing seatown architecture of the Victorian era, West Pier, Brighton Palace Pier and the beauty of the coastal line. His studio work advanced towards floral and industrial abstracts. With little to distract him, this was a prolific period of artistic activity for Gerard, as he was able to focus entirely on his painting. In May 2016, he contributed to the Artists Open Houses Festival, where more than 1,000 artists exhibited their work in venues across Brighton and Hove and in the surrounding areas. In July 2016, Gerard came second place in the 'professional artists' category at Pintar Rapido London, the UK's biggest plein air painting festival and competition. Later that year, in December, he participated in the Focus LDN 2016 Winter Exhibition at The Menier Gallery in Southwark, London. The exhibition featured 28 contemporary artists, working in a range of media, including painting, embroidery and photography. In June 2017, Gerard was selected out of over a thousand artists to participate in the Sky Arts Landscape Artist of the Year competition, held at Knaresborough Castle in Yorkshire. In July of the same year, he has been invited to participate as a guest artist in 2017's Pintar Rapido in Chelsea, London.

=== Return to Dublin and Gerard's Botanical Escape ===
While still living in London, in November 2017 Gerard established his new art gallery in Ireland, Gerard Byrne Studio Ranelagh, Dublin. In April 2018, Gerard launched his solo exhibition ‘Time is the Enemy’ at Gerard Byrne Studio in Ranelagh. ‘Time is the Enemy’ combined a mix of floral, architectural, landscape and figurative works, proving the unsurpassed versatility of Gerard's painting. The collection of works offered a subtle exploration of the theme of the passing of time. In June of that same year, Gerard and his wife Agata relocated from London back to Dublin. Same week Byrne celebrated 30 years of painting outdoors at the National Botanic Gardens (Ireland) in Dublin, in an exhibition entitled ‘Inside Outside & Beyond’. The exhibition was organised in collaboration with the Office of Public Works, and hosted at the National Botanic Gardens’ gallery space.

Following the success of 2018's ‘Inside Outside & Beyond’ exhibition, Ireland's Ambassador to Singapore, Patrick Bourne along with Dr Nigel Taylor, the Group Director of Singapore Botanic Gardens invited Gerard Byrne to take up Artist-in-Residence in the Gardens from August till September 2019. His trip was supported by the Department of Foreign Affairs and Trade (Ireland). Gerard's residency resulted in a new collection of plein-air paintings that paid homage to the lush foliage of Southeast Asia. This collection formed the basis of an exhibition co-hosted by the Singapore Botanic Gardens and the Irish Embassy in Singapore. Alongside Gerard's paintings from Singapore, the exhibition ‘Botanical Fusion’ featured his botanical works from the National Botanic Gardens of Ireland and London's Kew Gardens. The exhibition ran for a period of ten weeks at the People's Gallery in the Singapore Botanic Gardens with works on display in the open-air exhibition areas near the Tanglin, Nassim and Bukit Timah gates of the Gardens. Seen by over 50,000 visitors to the Gardens the exhibition was a part of the commemorative celebration of the Singapore Botanic Gardens' 160 years in existence. Moreover, it formed part of the Government's 2025 Asia Pacific Strategy to increase Ireland's visibility in the Asia Pacific region. In early 2020, the highly anticipated 'Botanical Fusion' collection created during Byrne's Artist-in-Residence at the Singapore Botanic Gardens made its way to Dublin. The collection of artworks was launched by Mr Ron Bolger, Honorary Consul-General of Singapore in Ireland on 27 February at the Gerard Byrne Studio as 'Botanical Fusion. Singapore to Dublin' exhibition. The collection of 42 artworks was widely praised. According to Patrick Bourne, Irish Ambassador to Singapore; "The new works that Gerard produced during his time as Artist-in-Residence at the Singapore Gardens are extraordinary and represent a unique rendering of the colour and atmosphere of this tropical place through the prism of a great Irish eye and talent." Due to the introduction of the Government restrictions as a result of the COVID-19 pandemic, ‘Botanical Fusion. Singapore to Dublin’ exhibition unexpectedly ended just days after the opening night. In response, Gerard Byrne Studio created accessible worldwide an innovative and interactive 360-degree virtual gallery tour of the exhibition. Launched on World Environment Day, 5 June 2020, as the first virtual experience offered by a privately owned art gallery in Ireland.

== Exhibitions ==
=== Solo exhibitions ===
- 2024 35 YEARS OF ART: Celebrating Gerard Byrne Gerard Byrne Studio, Dublin, Ireland
- 2024 Spirit of Place Gerard Byrne Studio, Dublin, Ireland
- 2023 Charcoalogy Gerard Byrne Studio, Dublin, Ireland
- 2022 Connections Wilton Gallery, Glasthule, Ireland
- 2022 Turning Corners Gerard Byrne Studio, Dublin, Ireland
- 2021 To the Sea Greenlane Gallery, Dingle, Ireland
- 2020 Pause for Harmony. Art in Lockdown 360 virtual exhibition, Gerard Byrne Studio, Dublin, Ireland
- 2020 Pause for Harmony. Art in Lockdown Gerard Byrne Studio, Dublin, Ireland
- 2020 Botanical Fusion. Singapore to Dublin 360 virtual exhibition, Gerard Byrne Studio, Dublin, Ireland
- 2020 Botanical Fusion. Singapore to Dublin Gerard Byrne Studio, Dublin, Ireland
- 2019 30 Years in the Making, Gerard Byrne Studio, Dublin, Ireland
- 2019 Botanical Fusion People's Gallery, Singapore Botanic Gardens, Singapore
- 2018 Inside Outside & Beyond Gallery Space, National Botanic Gardens, Dublin, Ireland
- 2018 Time is The Enemy Gerard Byrne Studio, Dublin, Ireland
- 2017 Gallery Opening, Gerard Byrne Studio, Dublin, Ireland
- 2016 Artists Open Houses Festival The Gerard Byrne Studio, Brighton, United Kingdom
- 2014 Gerard Byrne Studio, Gerard Byrne Studio, Clerkenwell, London, United Kingdom
- 2013 ART House, Dalkey, Ireland
- 2012 ART House, Dalkey, Ireland
- 2009 Gorry Gallery, Dublin
- 2008 Greenlane Gallery, Dingle, Ireland
- 2007 Gallery 4, Dublin
- 2006 Irish Fine Art, Dublin
- 2005 Irish Fine Art, Dublin
- 2004 Dalkey Arts Gallery, Dublin
- 2003 Gorry Gallery, Dublin
- 2001 Dalkey Arts Gallery, Dublin
- 2000 Gorry Gallery, Dublin
- 1998 Gorry Gallery, Dublin
- 1997 Bridge Gallery, Dublin
- 1996 Harrison Gallery, Dublin
- 1995 Jo Rain Gallery, Dublin
- 1995 Harrison Gallery, Dublin
- 1994 Jo Rain Gallery, Dublin
- 1994 Guinness Hop Store, Dublin
- 1993 Fortune Society, New York City
- 1992 Brown's Gallery, Dublin
- 1991 George Gallery, Dublin
- 1990 People's Gallery, Berlin
- 1989 George Gallery, Dublin

=== Recent group exhibitions ===
- 2024 Wild Atlantic Winter, Greenlane Gallery, Dingle, Ireland
- 2022 Páipéar, Hang Tough Contemporary, Central Plaza Dublin, Ireland
- 2018 The New English Art Club, Annual Exhibition, Mall Galleries, London, United Kingdom
- 2017 SKY ARTS, Landscape Artist of the Year, Knaresborough Castle, Yorkshire, United Kingdom
- 2017 An Exhibition of 17th – 21st Century Irish Paintings, Gorry Gallery, Dublin, Ireland
- 2017 Pintar Rapido, Chelsea Town Hall, Chelsea, London, United Kingdom
- 2016 Pintar Rapido, Posthoornkerk, Haarlemmerstraat, Amsterdam, the Netherlands
- 2016 Naked Eye Gallery, Hove, United Kingdom
- 2016 Revolution Show, The Observer Building, Hastings, United Kingdom
- 2016 Future Nepal Charity Auction, UCS Hampstead, Hampstead, London, United Kingdom
- 2016 Alzheimer's in the Frame, The Memorable Icons, The Alzheimer's Show, Olympia, Kensington, London, United Kingdom
- 2016 Alzheimer's in the Frame, The Memorable Icons, Gallery Elena Shchukina, Mayfair, London, United Kingdom
- 2016 Pintar Rapido, Chelsea Town Hall, Chelsea, London, United Kingdom
- 2016 Parallax Art Fair, Chelsea Town Hall, Chelsea, London, United Kingdom
- 2016 Focus LDN Winter Exhibition, Menier Gallery, Southwark, London, United Kingdom
- 2016 Focus LDN The Art of Regeneration, Menier Gallery, Southwark, London, United Kingdom
- 2015 Clerkenwell Design Week, Platform, Clerkenwell, London, United Kingdom

== Selected collections ==
- Irish Embassy, Beijing
- Irish Embassy, Singapore
- Singapore Botanic Gardens
- Department of the Marine
- Department of Justice
- Office of Public Works (OPW) Ireland
- Electricity Supply Board
- Guinness plc
- O2 Ireland
- Deutsche Bank West LB
- Woodchester Bank
- Durkan Homes
- Corrigan & Corrigan (Solicitors)
- The Citadelle Art Museum, Texas, USA
- Louis Walsh
- Paula Rowan Archived 22 October 2019 at the Wayback Machine
- Maeve Binchy and Gordon Snell
- Diarmuid Gavin and Justine Keane
- Sligo Park Hotel
- Marlfield House
- Ballymascanlon House Hotel
- Finnegans Pub, Dalkey
- Gresham Hotel, Dublin Archived 7 August 2019 at the Wayback Machine
- Shelbourne Hotel, Dublin
- Dylan Hotel, Dublin
