= Lee Dunne =

Irish author (1934–2021)

- Born: 21 December 1934; Dublin, Ireland
- Died: 10 April 2021 (aged 86); Bray, County Wicklow

Lee Dunne (21 December 1934 – 10 April 2021) was an Irish author, best known for his novel Goodbye to the Hill set in the Mountpleasant Buildings in the Hill Area, Ranelagh, Dublin.

== Early life ==
Christopher Lee Dunne was born in 1934, the fourth of seven children born to Mick and Katy Dunne of Mount Pleasant Buildings, a tenement slum in the area known as "The Hill" in Ranelagh, Dublin City, Ireland. A memoir of his early life in Dublin, Goodbye to The Hill, was an instant and controversial bestseller, with its frank depictions of sex and alcohol.

== Writing career ==
The Dublin-born writer's first novel, Goodbye to the Hill (1965) was a semi-autobiographical account of a rebellious young man growing up and coming of age in poverty in 1950s Dublin. It was an instant success and caused great controversy for its frank depiction of sex and alcohol. His second novel, the semi-autobiographical A Bed in the Sticks, documented his time as a travelling entertainer. Paddy Maguire is Dead, published in 1972, details the main character's alcoholism.

=== Reception ===
Dunne was described as the "most banned author in Ireland", with one of his novels being the last piece of literature to be banned, in 1976.

Dunne's third novel, Paddy Maguire Is Dead (1972), a graphic account of an Irish man's descent into alcoholism, was banned in Ireland in 1972. In a subsequent appearance on RTÉ Television's The Late Late Show, Dunne called the censor a cretin, which led to the banning of his next six books. Dunne appealed the decision of the Irish Censorship Board and was represented in court by barrister and future president of Ireland Mary Robinson. After his appeal was rejected, he provocatively handed out free copies of his books to the public on Grafton Street, Dublin, daring gardaí (police) to arrest him.

== Radio ==
Dunne wrote many radio scripts for RTÉ. He wrote the first 750 scripts for the Harbour Hotel radio series, which ran from 1975 to 1990 and was set in the fictional fishing village of Kilmahon. Altogether Dunne wrote some 2,000 scripts for RTÉ.

== Films ==
Lee Dunne wrote several films, including Paddy (1968), which was based on his book Goodbye to the Hill. This was banned in Ireland in 1970 for issues relating to sexual themes.

== Death ==
Dunne died on 10 April 2021, at the age of 86.

== Works (incomplete) ==
=== Books ===
- Goodbye to the Hill (London: Hutchinson, 1965)
- A bed in the sticks (London: Hutchinson, 1965)
- Does your mother? (London : Arrow Books, 1970)
- Paddy Maguire is dead (London : Arrow Books, 1972) (Banned 1972)
- The cabfather (London : Coronet Books, 1975) (Banned 1976)
- The cabbie who came in from the cold (London : Coronet Books, 1975) (Banned 1975)
- Ringleader (Glasgow : Molendinar Press, 1981, ©1980)
- Requiem for Reagan (Dublin : Kildanore 1990)
- No time for innocence (Dublin : Gill & Macmillan, 2000)
- Barleycorn blues (Dublin : Poolbeg Press, 2004)
- Dancers of Fortune (Dublin : Poolbeg Press, 2005)
- Seasons of destiny (Dublin: Poolbeg Press, 2006)
- Off the edge (Mullingar : Killynon House Books, 2006)
- My middle name is Lucky (Mullingar : Killynon House Books, 2006)

=== Plays ===
- Does Your Mother?
- Goodbye to the Hill
- The Full Shilling

=== Radio plays ===
- Harbour Hotel (RTÉ Radio 1)
- Convenience Corner

=== Films ===
- The pale-faced girl, 1968 (screenwriter)
- Wedding night, 1969
- Paddy, 1970 (writer) (banned 1970)

== Television ==
- Callan (1969, writer, 1 episode: season 2 episode 11. 'Once a big man, always a big man)
