= Mount Pleasant Square =

Georgian residential garden square in Dublin, Ireland

- Mountpleasant Square
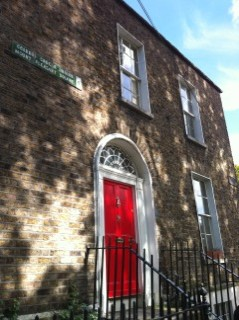
- 1 Mount Pleasant Square
- Interactive map of Mount Pleasant Square
- Native name: Cearnóg Chnocán Aoibhinn (Irish)
- Namesake: Mount Pleasant, London
- Area: 1.9 hectares (4.7 acres)
- Location: Ranelagh/Rathmines, Dublin, Ireland
- Postal code: D06
- Coordinates: 53.3274°N 6.2596°W

Other
- Known for: Georgian architecture

Mount Pleasant Square is a Georgian garden square on the border of Rathmines and Ranelagh, in the city of Dublin, Ireland.

The Georgian houses surrounding the square were constructed from around the year 1770 and the last was completed around 1830. There are 56 terraced houses on three sides of a central open space, now housing an 11 court tennis club, clubhouse and carpark and a small public park. The north and south sides are crescents rather than typical straight borders of a square.

The houses are by a degree more modest than the Georgian houses on other notable Georgian squares and were mostly built later in the first few decades of the 19th century for emerging middle class merchant and professional families.

== History ==
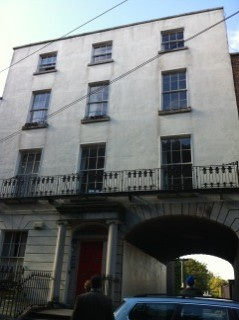
31 Mount Pleasant Square, home of Terence Dolan.

Mount Pleasant Square is about 100 metres from where the Ranelagh Gardens once stood. The public park is all that remains of what were once far more extensive grounds.

Mount Pleasant Square was developed in the late 18th century and early 19th century, much of it by the Dolan family. Terence Dolan was a glove maker from Chester who bought plots of land from a Solomon Williams (also of Chester) in three transactions: in 1807, 1808 and 1812.

On the first plot of land – on the south side of what is now the square, Dolan built eight houses (Nos 36–43). At the time, these houses would have had commanding views of the city centre. A speculative developer, Dolan leased out the properties on short leases and raised the money to build more houses. By 1812 he had acquired all the land on the north and west sides of the square.

The second son of Terence Dolan, Terence Thomas Dolan, a solicitor, was a key mover behind the Rathmines Township, and was one of its first commissioners in 1847. By 1848 he effectively owned 32 of the houses on the square. His son, Henry Joseph Dolan, became President of Mount Pleasant Lawn Tennis Club in the centre of the square, when it was established in 1893. He lived at number 31, the largest house on the square, with an archway to Mountpleasant Avenue. The family retained property interests in the square well into the 20th Century.

The social composition of the houses has always been varied. In the past, many doctors and solicitors lived on the square, which is relatively close to Fitzwilliam Square and the Law Library. The square once housed two schools, and in 1911 the 14 inhabitants of No 27 included a carpenter, a scholar and a fishmonger. Of the 387 people who lived on the square that year, there were 149 Catholics, 177 Church of Ireland, 20 Presbyterian, 10 Methodist and 7 Baptists. An average of 7 people lived in each house.

In the 24 March 1978 edition of In Dublin magazine, Gordon Lynch wrote, "The recently face-lifted Mount Pleasant Square, which is protected by a preservation order, is the only curved square in Dublin, if such a thing is possible."

As of 2026, about half of the houses are occupied by young families, while several remain in apartments.

== Architecture ==
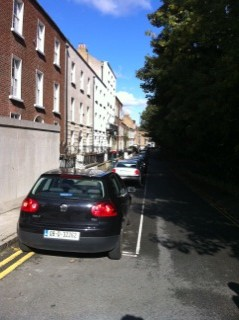
The west side of Mount Pleasant Square.

Most of the houses are two-storey over basements that are below ground level. Many of the gardens have now been shortened to accommodate mews buildings. There is a lot of variation in individual house construction, as the plot sizes are not uniform.

The houses were probably built by tradesmen rather than more skilled craftsmen and architects. Three bay houses were soon joined by smaller, two-bay houses that were effectively miniature versions of the city houses with two principal rooms on each floor. The basement walls are about two feet thick, with limestone calp used throughout.

Mount Pleasant Square is an example of rus in urbe, 'a countryside in the city'. The overall composition is more impressive than any one house. With its bucolic curtain of trees and handsome terraced Georgian houses, the atmosphere on this well-preserved square is often described as Dickensian, as if residents step into a period drama every time they leave the house. There is something elegant, if slightly bashful, about the whole effect: drooping trees, little traffic, gentle plop of tennis balls.

All of the houses on the square are protected structures as well as the original iron fencing, granite paving, post boxes and lamp posts.

== Public park and amenities ==
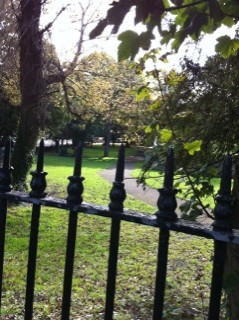
Mount Pleasant Square park.

The public park part of the square was the subject of a planning controversy in the 1970s. At one point it seemed inevitable that the thin sliver of land would be given over to a garage, but a well-orchestrated outcry ensured its survival as a public amenity. A small triangle of grass across the street from the square also forms part of the public park.

The Hill Pub occupies a prominent position at the south-east corner of Mount Pleasant Square. It is best described as a tall red brick Victorian pub from the outside.

== Old Mount Pleasant ==
The houses at Old Mountpleasant predate the houses in Mountpleasant Square and were built in the second half of the 18th century. Among the early residents was Thomas Ivory, a Corkman who was one of the most important architects working in Dublin in the latter part of the 18th Century (and the only one of the three major architects of Georgian Dublin who was Irish). He lived at number 6 Old Mount Pleasant.

== The Swan River ==
The Swan River, although now hidden from view, defines the landscape and topography of Ranelagh. From its source near Kimmage Manor it flows through Rathmines and Ranelagh and joins the River Dodder below Ballsbridge. In Ranelagh it flows to the east through Mount Pleasant Square (where the arch leads out to Mount Pleasant Avenue) before crossing into Ranelagh Gardens.

== Ranelagh Multi-Denominational School ==
This RIAI Gold Medal award-winning school was designed by O'Donnell & Tuomey Architects and opened in 1998 (subsequently extended). It replaced the 'tin school', a hall built in 1893 (later a church). The new building is contemporary in design but its scale and finishes (salvaged brick and timber) are in sympathy with the adjoining historic buildings.

== Mount Pleasant LTC ==
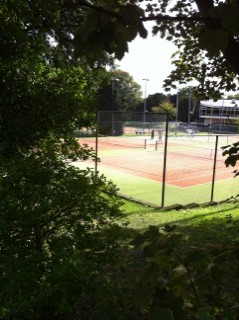
One of Mount Pleasant Square Lawn Tennis Club's courts.

The square is home to one of Dublin's leading racquet sports clubs, and the only club in the city with tennis, squash and badminton sections (and table tennis too). Mount Pleasant L.T.C. was founded in 1893, making it amongst the oldest clubs in Dublin.

The club holds a variety of tournaments, including Tennis Open Week, one of the largest tournaments in Ireland. Mount Pleasant is among the premier badminton clubs in Leinster. Membership stands at around 1,000 with about 700 tennis members and the rest more or less equally divided between squash and badminton.

== Mount Pleasant Square in media ==
The cover of John McGahern's novel, The Pornographer, features the curved north terrace of Mount Pleasant Square.

The cover of 'The Pornographer' by John McGahern

The TV series Miss Scarlet and The Duke features some of the houses of the square.

== Notable residents ==
- Thomas Ivory
- Eamon Dunphy
- Trevor White
