= Kate Phillips =

British actress (born 1989)

- Born: 21 May 1989 (age 37); England
- Education: Guildhall School of Music and Drama
- Occupation: Actress
- Years active: 2014–present
- Partner: Oliver Chris
- Children: 1

Kate Phillips (born 21 May 1989) is a British actress. She became known for her role as Jane Seymour in the miniseries Wolf Hall (2015). She subsequently appeared in the miniseries War & Peace (2016), the first season of the television series The Crown (2016), and the last three seasons of the television series Peaky Blinders (2016–2022). In 2019, she appeared as Princess Mary in the film Downton Abbey. Since 2020, she has appeared as Eliza Scarlet, the series lead, in the Victorian era crime drama, Miss Scarlet and The Duke.

== Early life ==
Until she was nine, Phillips lived in south-west London, but moved with her family to Nottinghamshire, then to Bristol. After spending three years studying at Leeds University, Phillips secured a place at the Guildhall School of Music and Drama in London.

== Career ==
After graduating from drama school, Phillips returned to Leeds to appear as Abigail Williams in The Crucible at the West Yorkshire Playhouse. By this time she had already filmed her scenes for the BBC's adaptation of Wolf Hall in which she played Jane Seymour, a role she had been offered whilst still studying at Guildhall. There was mild controversy following the initial airing of Wolf Hall after some historians described Phillips as 'too pretty' to play Henry VIII's third wife. This criticism was disregarded by several critics who praised Phillips's performance with Screen Daily naming her as a 'Star of Tomorrow'. She went on to secure roles in War & Peace, Peaky Blinders and The Crown.

An August 2018 announcement indicated that Phillips would be among the new cast to join the original actors in the feature film Downton Abbey which started principal photography at about the same time. In 2020, Phillips took on the lead role in the detective series Miss Scarlet and The Duke.

In 2024, Phillips launched the production company Just John Films with Rosie Day and Amber Anderson.

In 2025, Phillips starred in The Weir, a play by Conor McPherson, in the Harold Pinter Theatre, London.

== Personal life ==
Phillips is the partner of actor Oliver Chris and they have a daughter.

== Filmography ==
=== Film ===
Year	Title	Role	Notes
2018	The Little Stranger	Diana Baker-Hyde	
2019	The Aftermath	Susan	
2019	Downton Abbey	Princess Mary	
2021	Benediction	Hester	
2025	The Yellow Tie	Ioana Celibidache	

=== Television ===
Year	Title	Role	Notes
2015	Wolf Hall	Jane Seymour	5 episodes
2016	War & Peace	Lise Bolkonskaya	3 episodes
2016	The Crown	Venetia Scott	3 episodes
2016	My Mother and Other Strangers	Tillie Zeigler	3 episodes
2016–2022	Peaky Blinders	Linda Shelby	Recurring role (series 3); main role (series 4–6)
2018	The Alienist	Laura Boone	Episode: "Silver Smile"
2020	The English Game	Laura Lyttelton	5 episodes
2020–present	Miss Scarlet and The Duke	Eliza Scarlet	Series lead
2022	Atlanta	Wendy	Episode: "White Fashion"
2023	Hijack	Collette	7 episodes
2024	Wolf Hall: The Mirror and the Light	Jane Seymour	4 episodes
