= Ranelagh =

Residential area of Dublin City

Ranelagh Raghnallach (Irish)
- Inner suburb
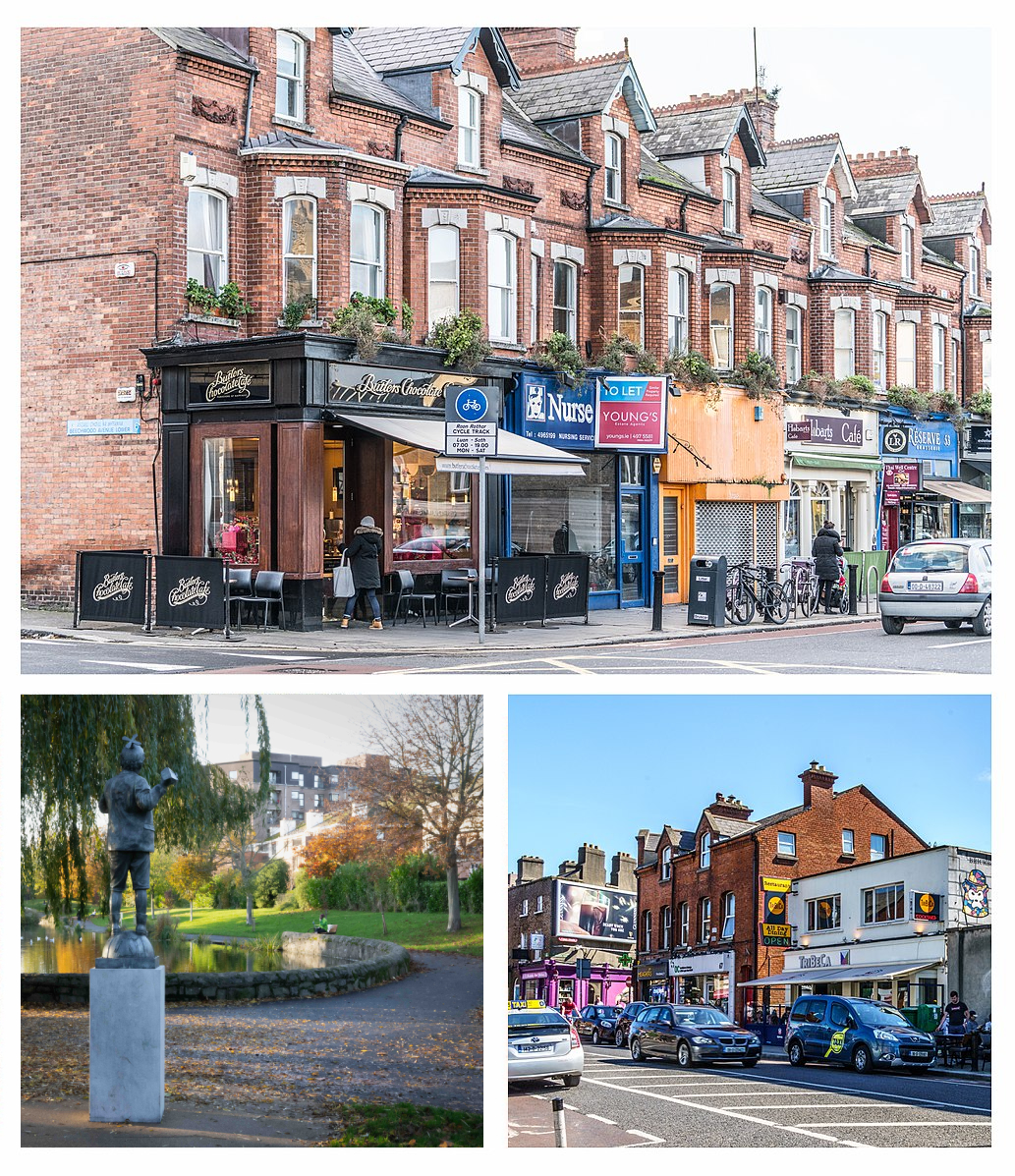
- Clockwise from top: Ranelagh Main Street; businesses in Ranelagh; Ranelagh Gardens

- Location in Ireland Ranelagh (Dublin)
- Coordinates: 53.3253°N 6.2550°W
- Country: Ireland
- Province: Leinster
- County: County Dublin
- Local authority: Dublin City Council
- Dáil constituency: Dublin Bay South
- European Parliament: Dublin
- Elevation: 36 m (118 ft)

Ranelagh (/ˈrænələ/ RAN-ə-lə, locally /ˈrɛn-/ REN-; Irish: Raghnallach, IPA: [ˈɾˠəinˠəl̪ˠəx]) is an affluent residential area and urban village on the Southside of Dublin, Ireland in the postal district of Dublin 6.

Ranelagh was originally a village called Cullenswood. It has a history of conflict, including the attack on English inhabitants in 1207 and the Battle of Rathmines in 1649. Incorporated into Dublin in the 19th century, it experienced significant development. Ranelagh Gardens, a popular entertainment venue, was established in the 1770s, and Richard Crosbie famously flew in a hot air balloon from the Gardens in 1785.

In the 1970s and 1980s, areas of Ranelagh were bought for office space development. Today, the district is part of the local electoral area of Pembroke. Ranelagh is home to several primary and secondary schools, including Scoil Bhríde, the first Irish-language school in Ireland, and Ranelagh Multi-Denominational School.

Ranelagh has been the setting for a number of literary and film works, such as Lee Dunne's Goodbye to the Hill and John McGahern's The Pornographer. It is also home to the Ranelagh Arts Centre and sports clubs like Ranelagh Gaels. The district is well-connected by public transport, including the Luas Green Line tram and bus routes.

== History ==
The district was originally a village known as Cullenswood just outside Dublin, surrounded by landed estates. On Easter Monday in 1207, a celebrating group of English inhabitants of Dublin were attacked here by Irish raiders from county Wicklow. Three hundred people were said to have been killed. In the 1520s and 1530s Cullenswood was held by the de Meones family, who also owned, and gave their name to, nearby Meonesrath, now Rathmines.

In the early years of the Irish Confederate Wars (1641–1649), the area was the scene of skirmishes culminating in the Battle of Rathmines in August 1649. After the Irish united with the Royalists against the Parliamentarians, an attempt was made to take Dublin. Their army under Ormonde was defeated, many of them killed, and the place where they fell (mainly between Rathmines and Ranelagh) was known for a long time as the Bloody Fields.

The area was incorporated into the expanding city in the 19th century, after which massive development took place. The locality became known as Ranelagh when a popular entertainment venue (now a public park) was established about 1770 and named Ranelagh Gardens after a similar venture of the same name in Chelsea, London. The Gardens were opened in 1766 by William Hollister, a London organ-builder. (The model and the name were also copied in other cities, including Liverpool, New York and Paris). The original Ranelagh Gardens in Chelsea was built on the site of Ranelagh House, the London home of the Jones family, who took their title (Earl of Ranelagh) from lands in County Wicklow that had belonged to Fiach McHugh O'Byrne sometimes described as Lord Ranelagh, because he was head of the Gabhal Ragnaill branch of the O'Byrne clan.

In 1785, only two years after the first manned flight in history, Richard Crosbie successfully flew in a hot air balloon from Ranelagh Gardens to Clontarf. The 225th anniversary of his flight was commemorated with a balloon flight from the same gardens on 23 January 2010 although due to adverse weather the balloon did not take off. In 2013, the Ranelagh Arts Festival organised another commemorative flight, manned by Tom McCormack, this time successfully.

The population in the 1841 census was 2,290.

In the 1970s and 1980s, areas of Ranelagh were bought up with the intention of developing the sites as office space, during a boom period of such construction in the wider city. One development site, purchased in 1972 by Fergus Morton, was a former builder's yard near Athlumney Villas, a terrace of artisan houses. Morton employed Delaney McVeigh and Pike to draw up a plan for two large office blocks on the site. The site was sold with the planning permission a number of times until it was purchased by the Construction Industry Federation, who built the office blocks, completing them in 1983.

== Geography ==
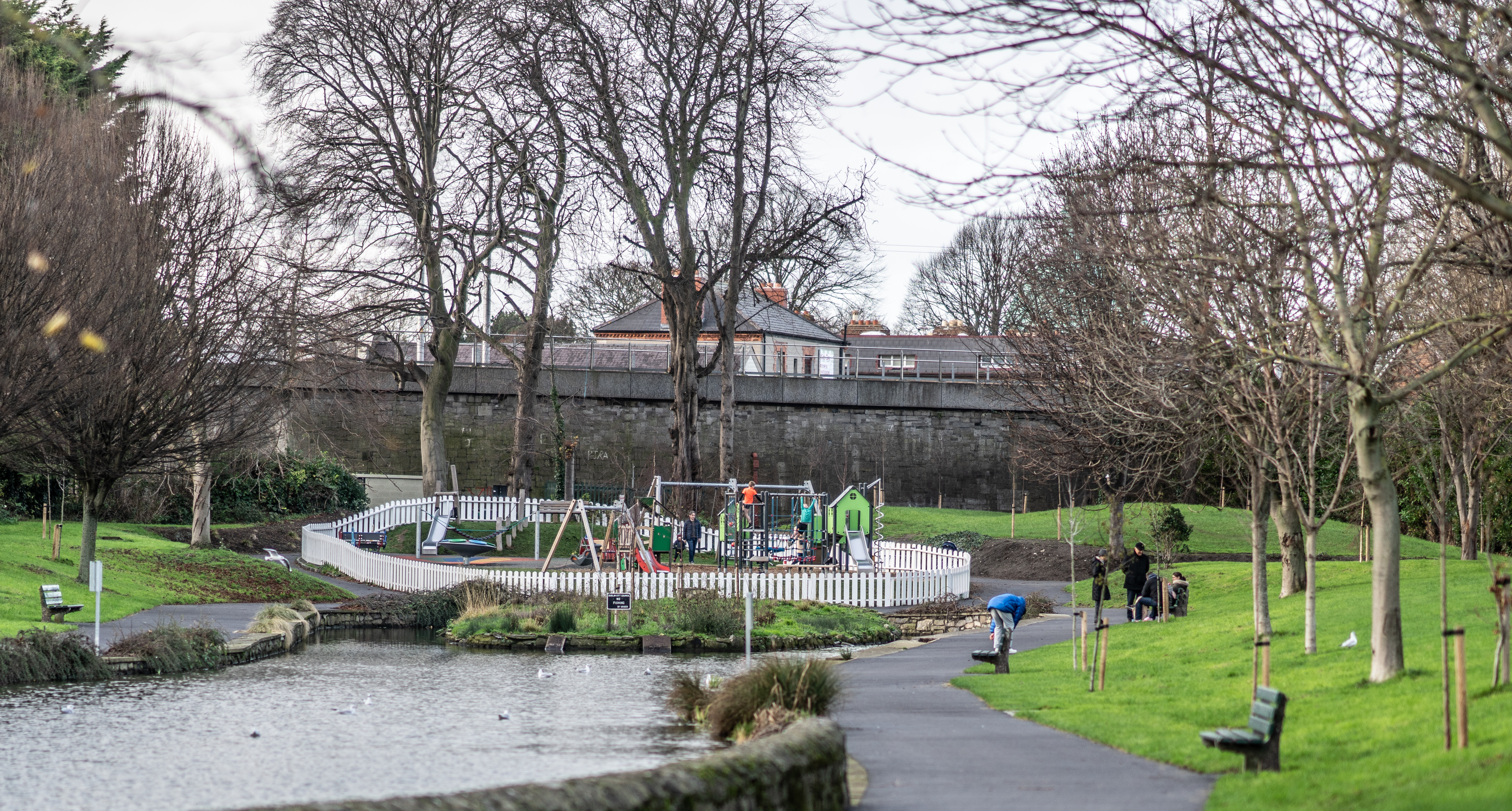
Playground in Ranelagh Gardens

The name Ranelagh applies to many geographical features. The stretch of road joining Sandford Road (which begins at the corner of Anna Villa) to Ranelagh Road (which begins at the railway bridge) is known as Ranelagh or Ranelagh Village. The whole surrounding area is also popularly known as Ranelagh, stretching from Charlemont Bridge on the Grand Canal at the northern end of Ranelagh Road down to the junction with Milltown Road at the southern end of Sandford Road, and from Leeson Street to the East towards Rathmines to the West. At the centre of Ranelagh is "Ranelagh Triangle", semi-officially "the Angle", which is the junction of Ranelagh Village and Charleston Road at Field's Terrace. Nearby restaurant "Tribeca" references these geographical features (i.e., Tri-angle Be-low Ca-nal). To the North of the Triangle is the "Hill Area" of Ranelagh, which was the scene of Lee Dunne's novel, Goodbye to the Hill. Ranelagh contains many fine Victorian streets such as those surrounding Mount Pleasant Square.

The townlands of Ranelagh North and Ranelagh South are in the civil parish of St. Peter's and in the barony of Uppercross. They are bounded on the north by Harcourt Road and Adelaide Road, on the east by Sussex Road and an old irregular boundary from there to Chelmsford Road, on the south by Chelmsford Road, Ranelagh Village, Charleston Road, Oakley Road and Dunville Avenue, and on the west by Beechwood Park, Belgrave Square East, Mountpleasant Avenue Upper, Bessborough Parade, Rathmines Road Lower and Richmond Street South. The area, popularly known today as Ranelagh, also includes parts of the adjoining townlands of Cullenswood, Sallymount and Milltown.

== Electoral area ==
Ranelagh is in the local electoral area of Pembroke since 2019. From 2014 to 2019 it was in the Rathgar–Rathmines LEA and prior to that in Pembroke–Rathmines. It is located in the Dáil constituency of Dublin Bay South with effect from the 2016 general election, formerly Dublin South-East.

It was part of the urban district of Rathmines and Rathgar, which was abolished in 1930.

== Education ==
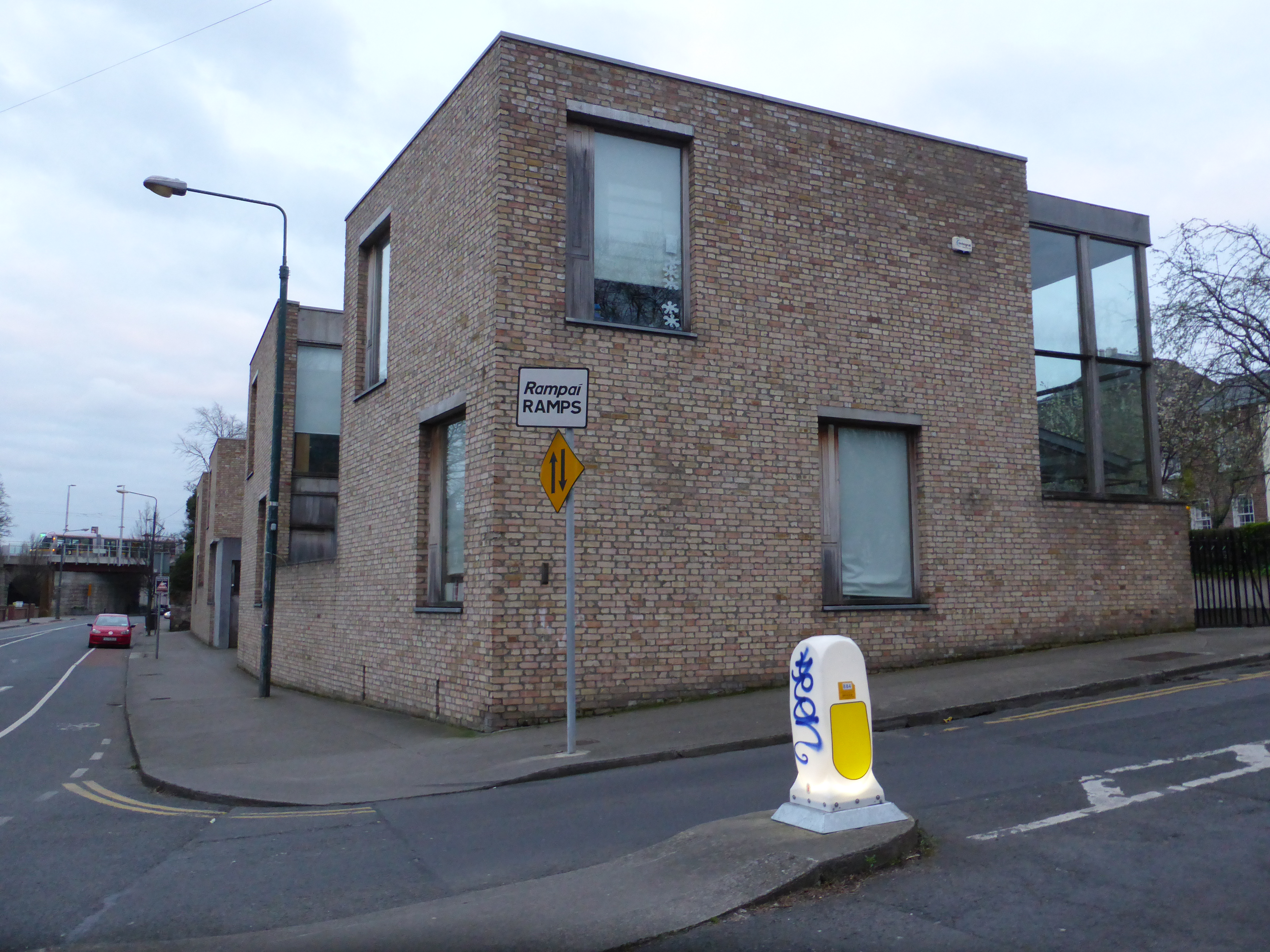
Ranelagh Multi-denominational School

There are several primary and secondary schools in the area. Scoil Bhríde, founded in 1917, was the first gaelscoil (Irish-language school) in Ireland. Lios na nÓg, another gaelscoil, is located in Cullenswood House on Oakley Road, where St. Enda's School (Scoil Éanna) was set up by Patrick Pearse in 1908. This was the first school in Ireland where pupils were taught in both Irish and English. St. Enda's school then moved to Rathfarnham in 1912 leaving the school building, Cullenswood House, unoccupied. In 1998, Lios na nÓg moved in and the school went under a major refurbishment over the period 2008-'09.

The Ranelagh Multi-Denominational School is another primary school, established in September 1988, and located on the main Ranelagh Road, close to the Luas stop. It is on the site of the old St. Columba's national school, which was donated to RMDSA, the school's promoting body, by the Church of Ireland. The school won many awards for the architecture of the building, built in the late 1990s.

Other primary schools in the area include Sandford National School, located close to Gonzaga College. Secondary schools include Gonzaga College for boys and Sandford Park School.

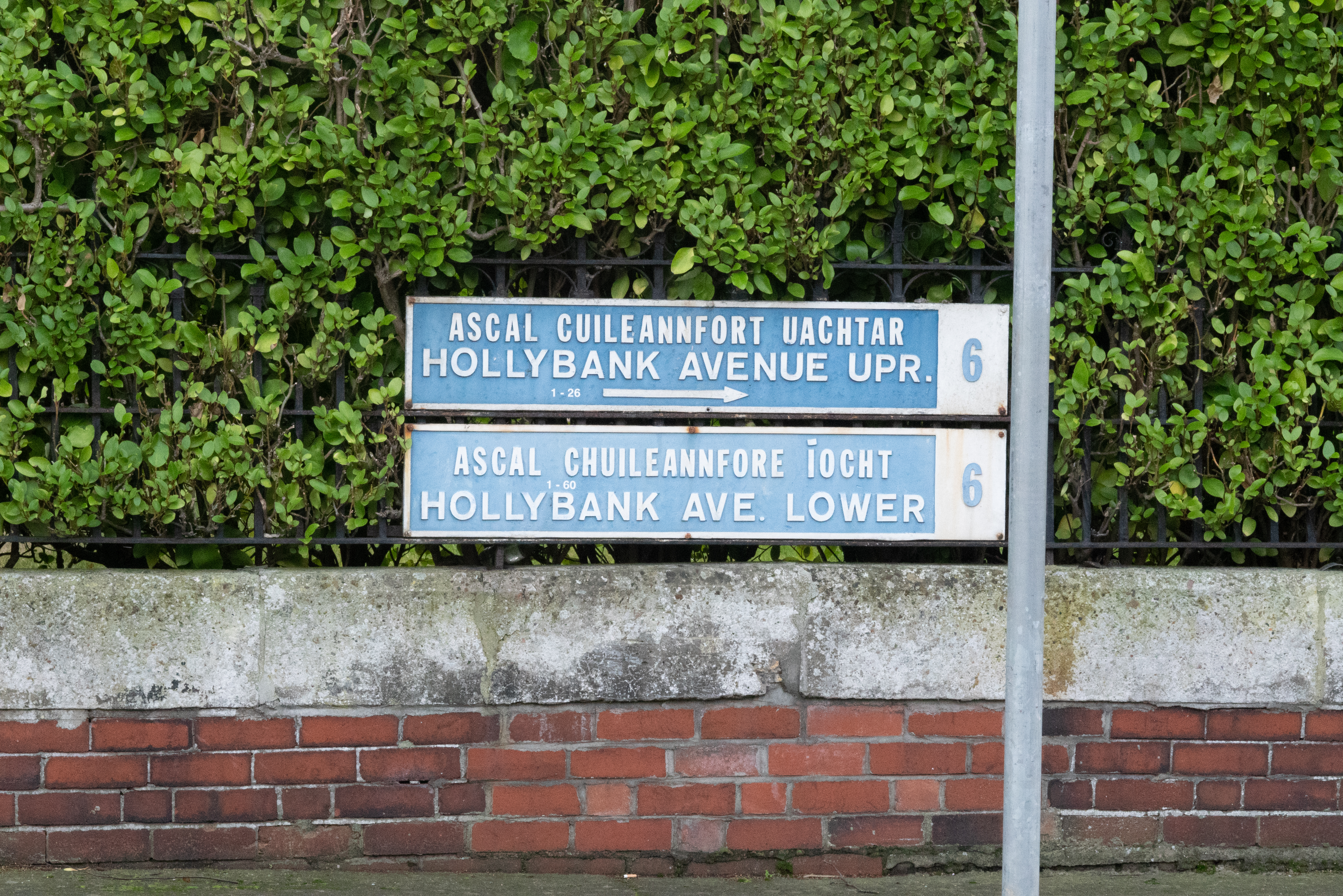
Street signs in Ranelagh

== Culture ==
Lee Dunne's novel Goodbye to the Hill is set in Ranelagh.

The cover picture of John McGahern's The Pornographer is of Mount Pleasant Square.

In March 2013, Lenny Abrahamson, Irish film and television director, filmed part of his movie Frank on Cowper Gardens and Park Drive of Ranelagh.

The 1965 movie Young Cassidy, starring Maggie Smith and Rod Taylor, was filmed in parts of Ranelagh.

Ranelagh Arts Centre is located on Ranelagh Main Street, across the road from the Luas Station. The centre presents exhibitions by artists from the locality and beyond with regular open calls. As part of the Ranelagh Arts Festival 2021, short films were screened in the Stella Movie Theatre in the Ranelagh hotel, The Devlin Hotel.

== Sport ==
Ranelagh Gaels GAA was founded in 2003. The club's Ladies' Gaelic football team won the Dublin Junior E Championship in 2010 and added the Junior D title in 2019. The men's Gaelic football team won the Dublin Junior 2 Championship at Parnell Park in 2018. The hurling team lines out in the Dublin Junior H Championship. An underage section was started in 2012.

== Transport ==
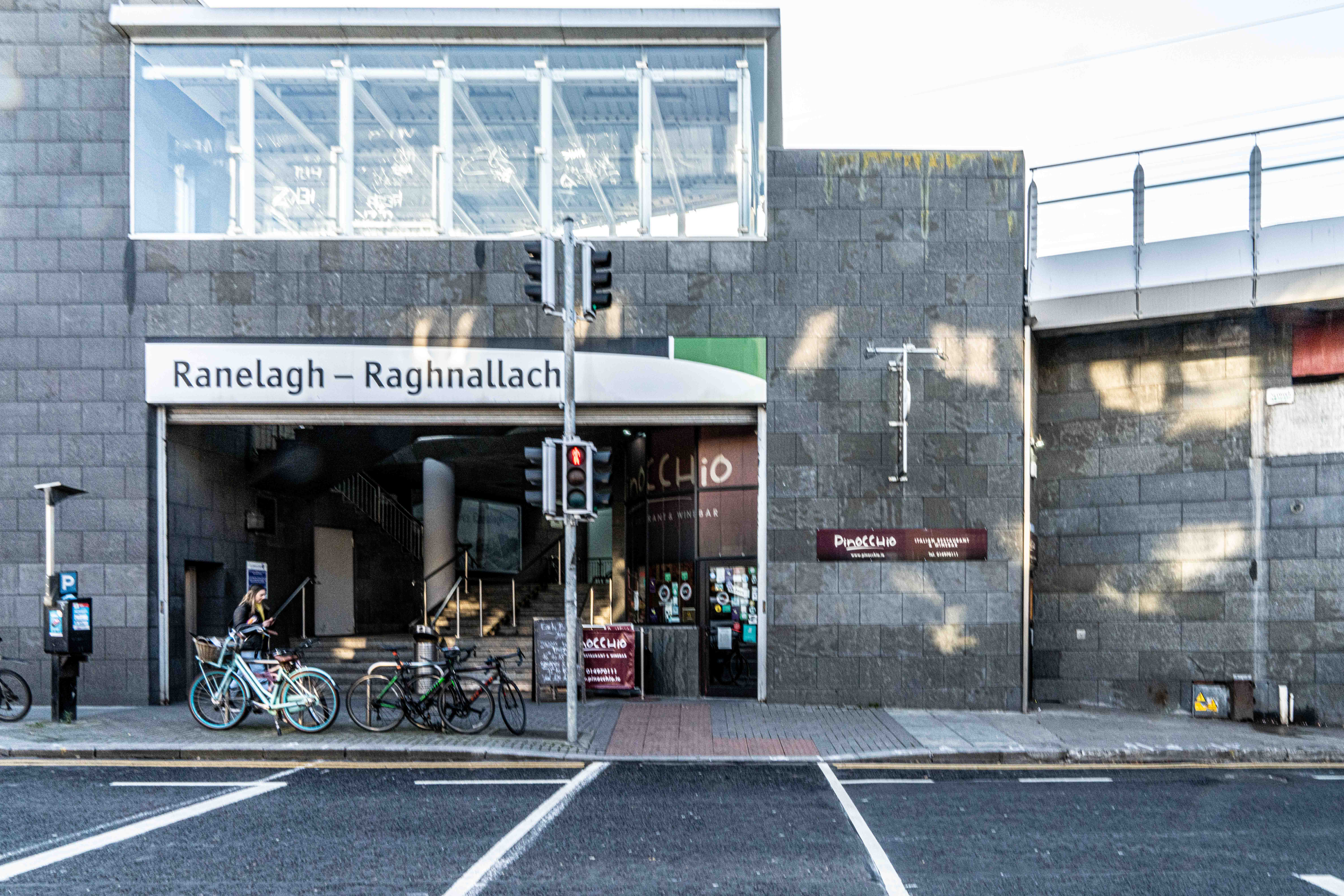
The Luas tram station in Ranelagh

The Luas Green Line has two stops in the Ranelagh area: Ranelagh (on Ranelagh Road) and Beechwood (on Dunville Avenue), built on the site of the former Rathmines and Ranelagh railway station on the Harcourt Street railway line (the station opened on 16 July 1896, and finally closed on 1 January 1959).

The Dublin Bus 11, 44, 44d, and S2 routes pass through Ranelagh.

Initial plans for the Dublin Metro (later Metrolink) included a proposed upgrade of Ranelagh Luas stop to a metro station. However, as a result of the portal of the tunnel being moved south, to just north of Beechwood, these plans were updated such that the Metro would instead stop at Beechwood and Charlemont Luas stop, just north of Ranelagh. Beechwood would become the southernmost Luas stop, with the line further south being served only by the Metro.

== Gallery ==
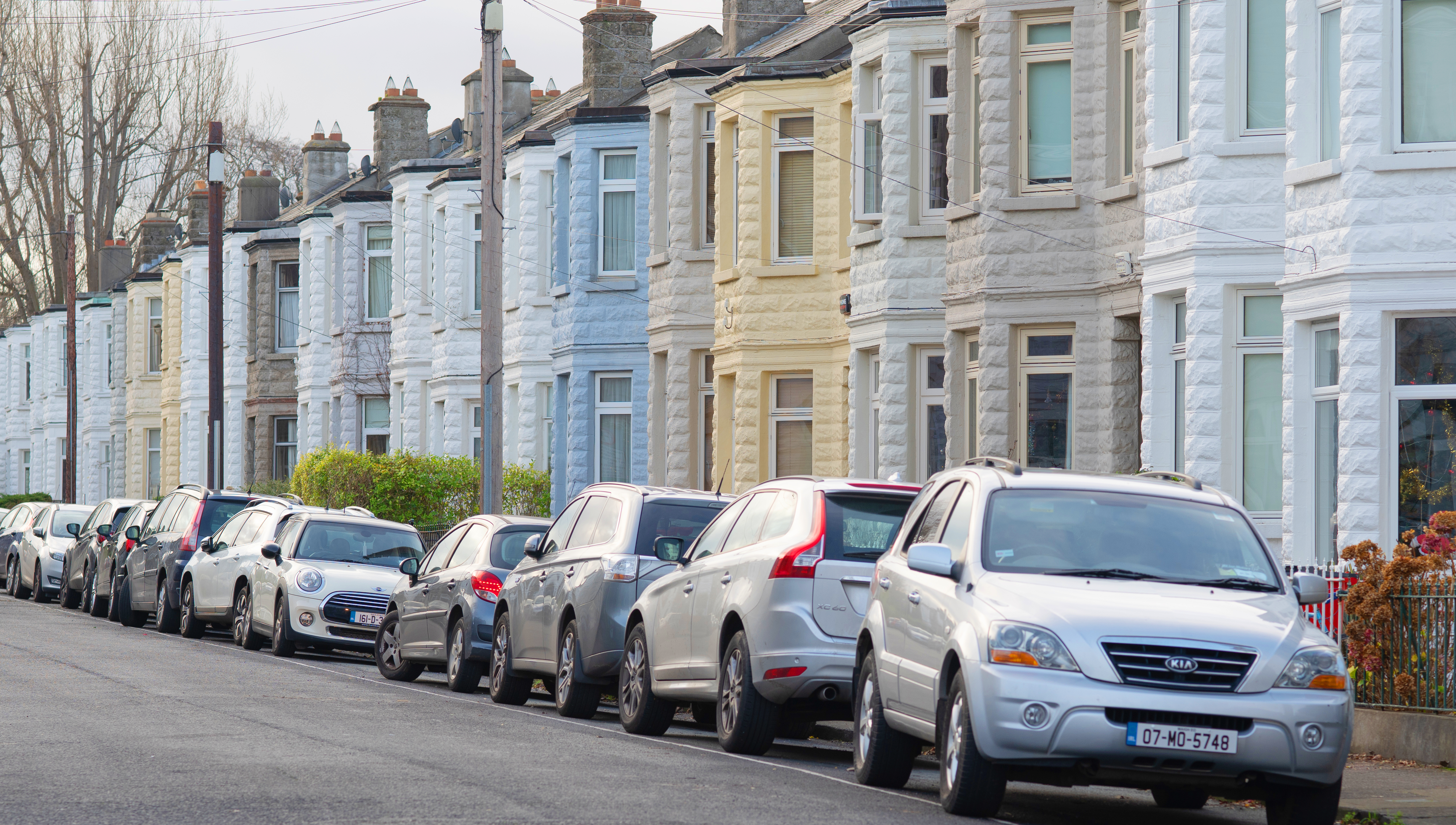
Lower Cherryfield Avenue, Ranelagh

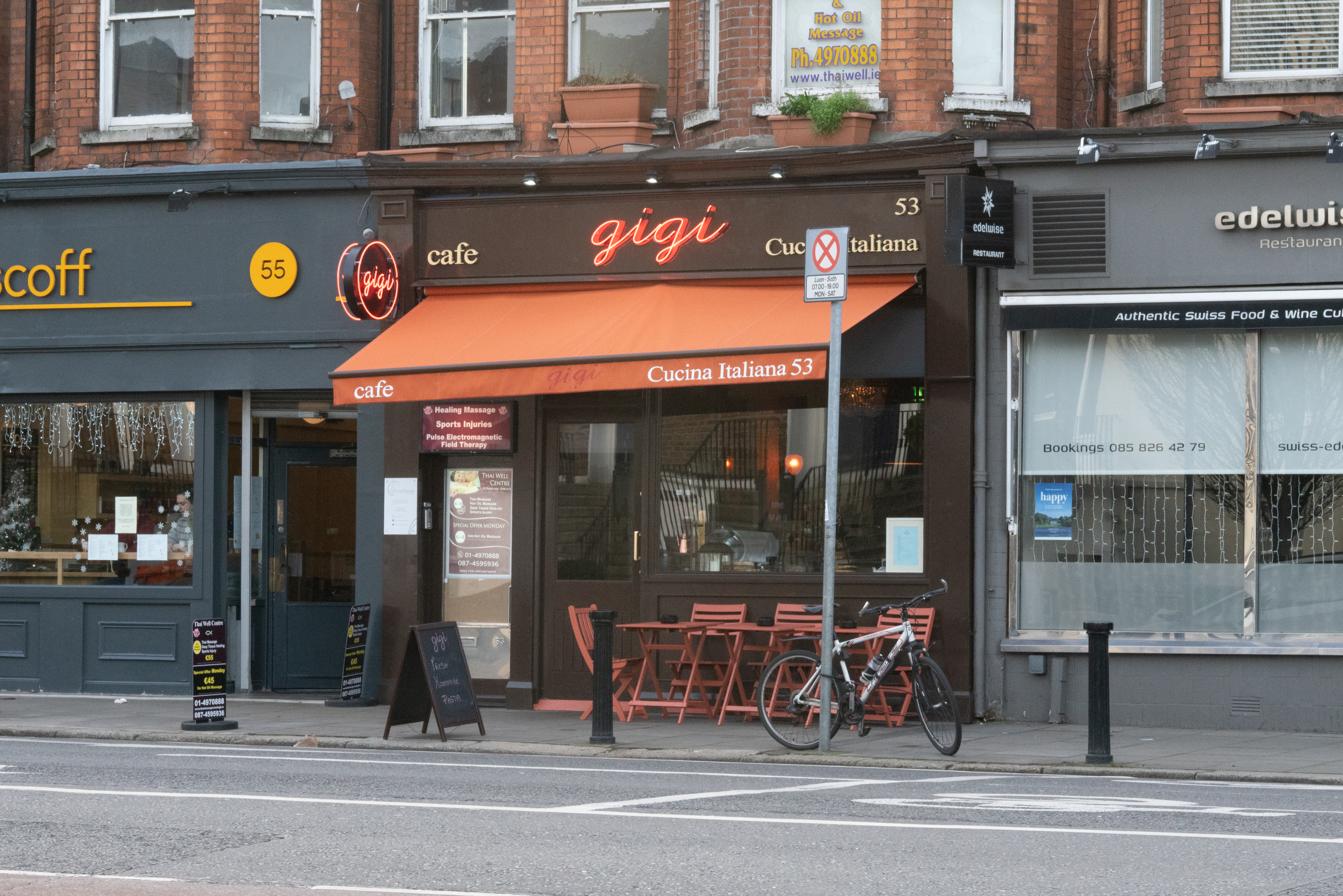
Restaurants on Ranelagh Main Street

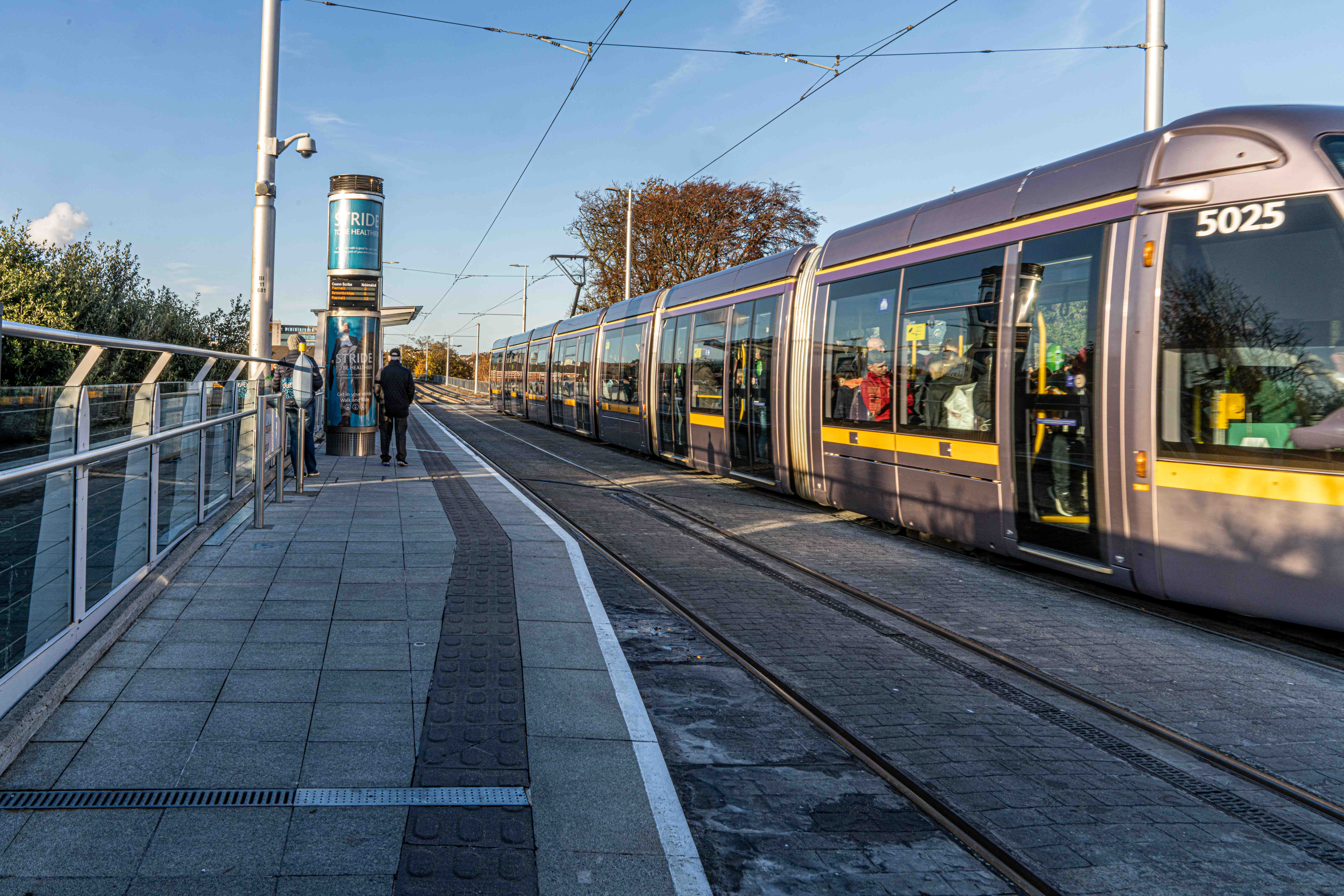
A Luas tram at Ranelagh station

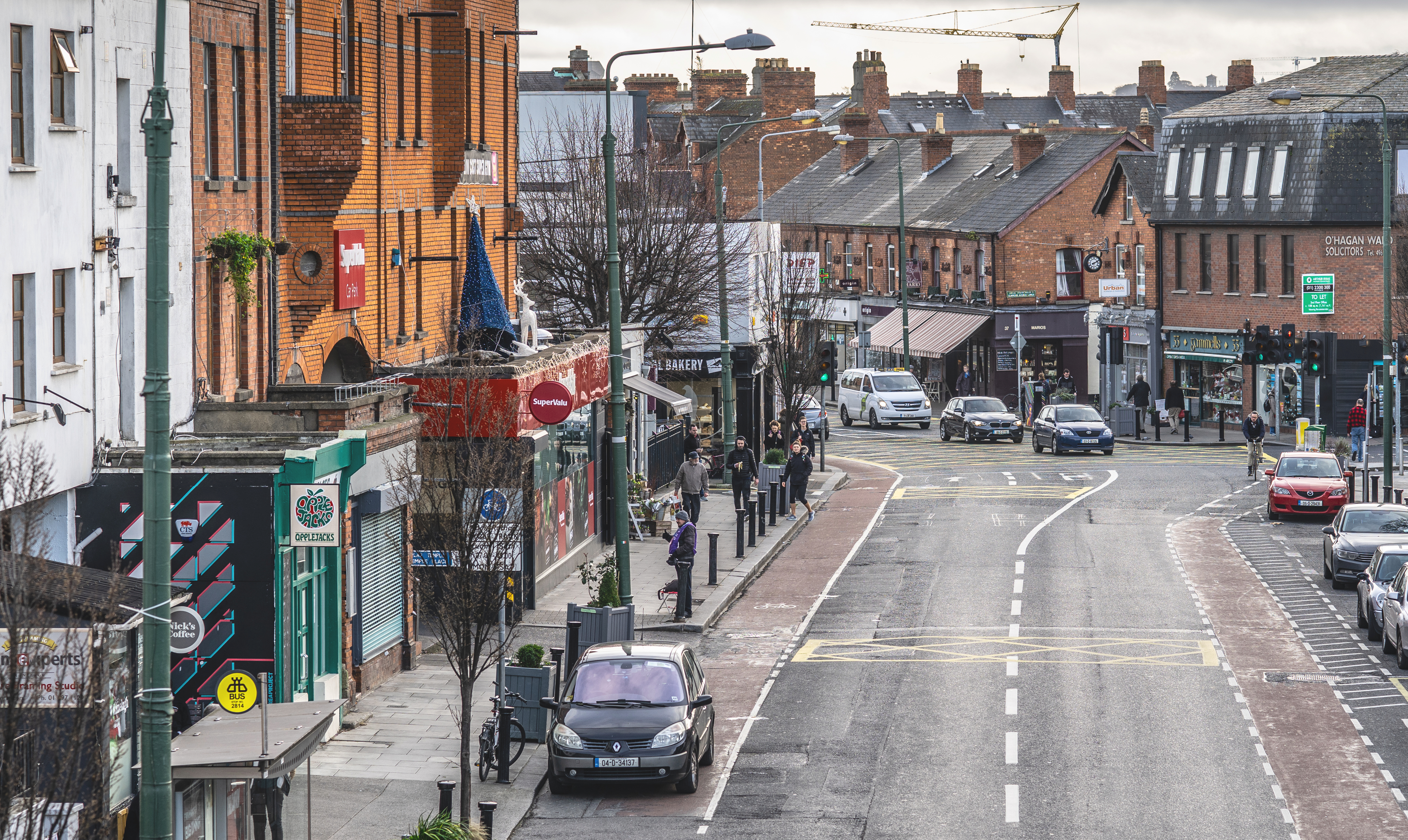
Main Street, Ranelagh in winter

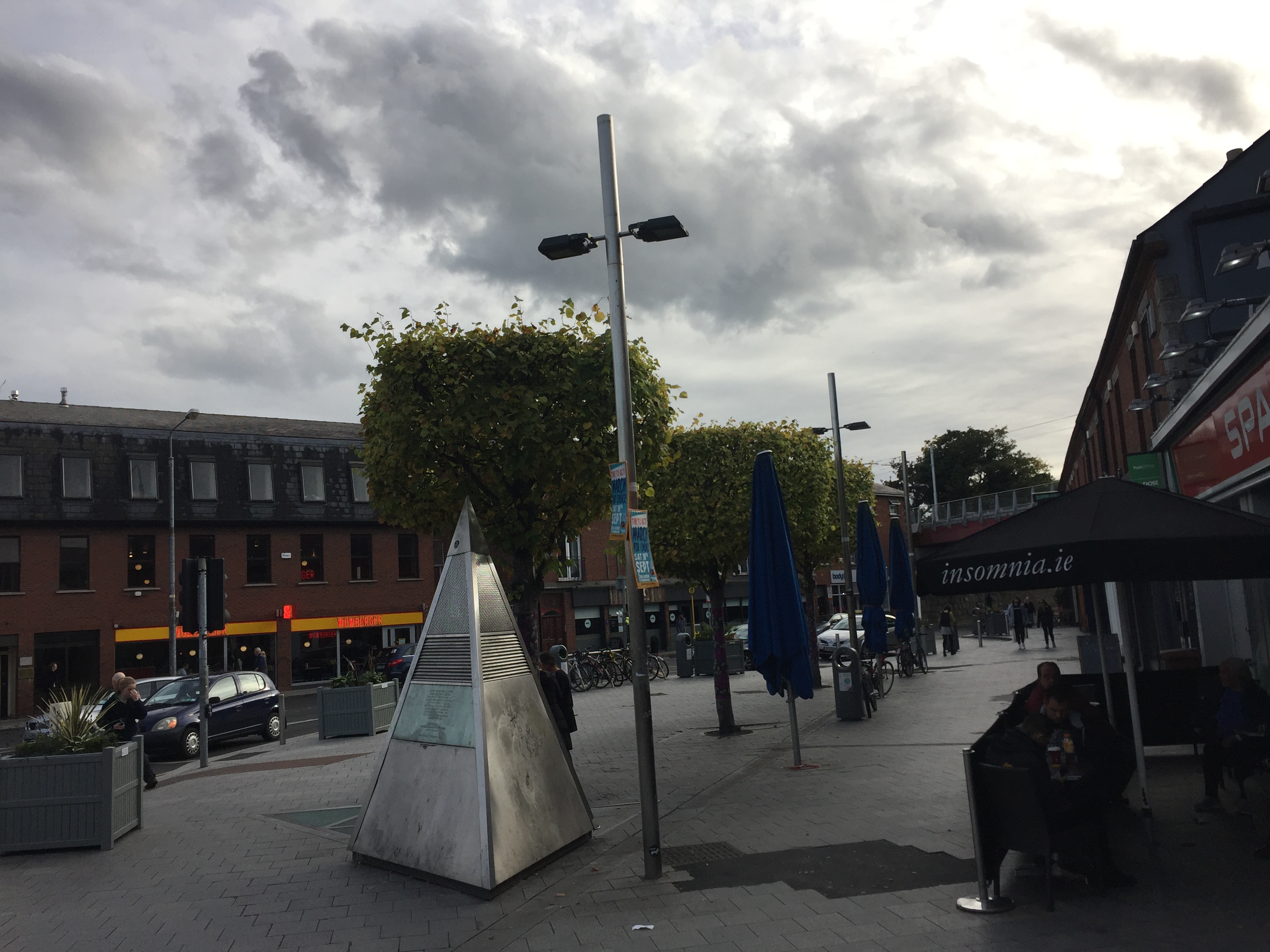
Ranelagh triangle in 2017 with monument to activist Deirdre Kelly

== People ==
Notable people associated with Ranelagh include the following:

- Wilfrid Brambell (1912–85), film and television actor best known for his role in the British television series Steptoe and Son, was raised on Edenvale Road
- Maeve Brennan (1917–93), short story writer and long-time journalist with The New Yorker magazine, was born and raised in Ranelagh; she set the majority of her fiction in a terraced house based on her home at 48 Cherryfield Avenue
- Robert Briscoe (1894–1969), former Lord Mayor of Dublin and TD, was born on Lower Beechwood Avenue, Ranelagh
- Gerard Byrne (1958-), Irish artist, modern Impressionist, is living and exhibiting his work at the Gerard Byrne Studio, 15 Chelmsford Road, Ranelagh
- Martin Cahill (1949–1994) aka The General, career criminal, was assassinated on Charleston Road at the junction with Oxford Road, Ranelagh on 18 August 1994
- George Campbell (1917–79), Irish painter and Stained Glass artist lived on Florence Terrace, Leeson Park Avenue in the 1960s
- Hazel Chu (1980- ), Dublin City Councillor and former Lord Mayor of Dublin, lives in Ranelagh with her husband Patrick Costello, TD and their daughter
- Helen Dillon (1940- ), one of Ireland's most famous gardeners, who lived on Sandford Road from 1972 to 2016, operating one of the country's most visited gardens
- Ken Doherty (1969- ), former world snooker champion, is from the area and used to practice in a local snooker club, Jason's (demolished in 2012)
- Eamon Dunphy (1945- ), Irish media personality, broadcaster, author, sports pundit and former professional footballer, lives in Ranelagh
- Garret FitzGerald (1926–2011), who was Taoiseach (Prime Minister) of Ireland twice in the 1980s, and Fine Gael Leader 1977–87, lived the last years of his life at Anna Villa in Ranelagh
- Eleanor Knott (1886–1975), Irish language scholar, was born in 2 Sallymount Terrace, where she lived much of her life
- Seosamh Laoide (1865–1939), Irish language scholar was born at 7 Annaville Lower in Ranelagh
- Seán MacEntee (1889–1984), IRA leader, Fianna Fáil politician and government minister, lived in Marlborough Road
- Nell McCafferty (1944–2024), Northern Irish civil rights campaigner and journalist, lived in Ranelagh for many years
- Ciaran McCoy, aka PIGSY, (1972–), expressionist artist lives in Ranelagh off Appian Way
- Michael McDowell (1951- ), Senator, Former Tánaiste and Minister for Justice and Leader of the Progressive Democrats, lives in Ranelagh, off the "triangle"
- Máire Mhac an tSaoi (1922–2021), noted Irish language poet and scholar, lived in Marlborough Road
- Eamon Morrissey (1943- ), actor, grew up in Ranelagh, coincidentally in the same house as Maeve Brennan, 48 Cherryfield Avenue, and has written and performed a play about the property, "Maeve's House"
- Michael Mulcahy (1960- ), former Fianna Fáil TD, lives in the Beechwood area of Ranelagh
- John Mulholland (1962- ), editor of the UK newspaper The Observer, grew up in Ranelagh
- Deirdre O'Connor (1951–1999), architect, first female president of the Architectural Association of Ireland, was born in Ranelagh
- Peadar O'Donnell (1893–1986), Irish republican and socialist revolutionary, lived at 39 Marlborough Road for many years
- Maureen O'Hara (1920–2015), Hollywood actress, grew up at 32 Upper Beechwood Avenue
- Brendan O'Reilly (1929–2001), Olympian, RTÉ commentator, journalist, singer, songwriter, actor, and author, lived in Ranelagh for many years until his death
- Pádraig Pearse (1879–1916) lived in Ranelagh until he moved his school to Rathfarnham
- Mary Robinson (1944- ), former President of Ireland and UN High Commissioner, was a resident of Sandford Road
- Simone Rocha (1986-) – the Irish fashion designer's family home is in Ranelagh
- Eamon Ryan (1963- ), Leader of the Green Party, lived in the Ashfield Road area for a time
- Bernie Tormé (1952–2019), rock guitarist, singer, songwriter
- Jack B. Yeats (1871–1957), noted Irish artist and brother of W.B. Yeats, lived in 61 Marlborough Road, Ranelagh

== See also ==
- List of towns and villages in the Republic of Ireland
