= List of architecture awards =

This list of architecture awards is an index of notable architectural awards, including global, international, regional, thematic, national, student and young architect, and local-scale awards.

== Global ==
Name	Established	Sponsor	Frequency	Recipient	Notes	Ref.
2A Continental Architectural Awards	2015	2A Magazine	annual	architect		
Aga Khan Award for Architecture	1977	Aga Khan Trust for Culture	triennial	project	USD 1 million	
Alvar Aalto Medal	1967	Finnish Association of Architects	intermittent	architect		
Ammodo Architecture Awards	2024	Ammodo Foundation	annual	architect, project	3 categories	
ArchDaily Building of the Year Awards	2009	ArchDaily	annual	building		
Architecture MasterPrize	2016	Farmani Group	annual	architect, designer, firm		
Carlsberg Architectural Prize	1991–1998	New Carlsberg foundation	triennial	architect	discontinued	
Civic Trust Awards	1959		annual			
Curry Stone Design Prize	2008–2017	Curry Stone Foundation	annual	architect, artist, other	discontinued	
Dedalo Minosse International Prize	1997	ALA-Assoarchitetti and Veneto Regione (Italy)	biennial	client		
Erich Schelling Architecture Award	1992	Erich Schelling Foundation	biennial	architect		
Erich Schelling Architecture Theory Award	1992	Erich Schelling Foundation	biennial	architect		
Global Award for Sustainable Architecture	2006	Scientific Committee of the Award from the Mimar Sinan University Istanbul, the International Architecture Biennale Ljubljana and the Università Iuav Venice.	annual	architect, urbanist, engineer		
Good Design Award	1996	The Chicago Athenaeum Museum of Architecture and Design, the European Centre for Architecture Art Design and Urban Studies	annual	architect, designer		
Holcim Awards for Sustainable Construction	2005	Holcim Foundation for Sustainable Construction	biennial	project	USD 1 million	
IALD International Lighting Design Awards	1983	International Association of Lighting Designers	annual	lighting designer		
IES Illumination Awards	1973	Illuminating Engineering Society	annual	lighting designer		
International Architecture Awards	2005	The Chicago Athenaeum Museum of Architecture and Design, the European Centre for Architecture Art Design and Urban Studies	annual	building	33–114 per year	
International Design Awards	2007	Farmini Group	annual	architect		
International Highrise Award	2003	City of Frankfurt, German Architecture Museum and DekaBank	biennial	architect, building		
UIA Gold Medal	1984	International Union of Architects	triennial	architect		
Jane Drew Prize	1998	Royal Institute of British Architects	annual	person	for promotion of innovation, diversity and inclusiveness in architecture	
Obel Award	2019	Henrik Frode Obel Foundation	annual	architect, project		
Praemium Imperiale	1989	Japan Art Association	annual	architect	4 other categories; gold medal and JPY15,000,000 prize	
Pritzker Prize	1979	Pritzker family	annual	architect	bronze medallion and US$100,000 prize	
RIBA President's Medals	1836	Royal Institute of British Architects	annual	recent graduates worldwide		
Royal Gold Medal	1848	Royal Institute of British Architects	annual	architect	gold medal	
Tamayouz Excellence Award for Architecture	2012	Coventry University, the Iraqi Business Council in Jordan, Dewan Architects and Engineers, the United Nations Global Compact - Iraq Network, Ayad Al Tuhafi Architects, Bonair Ltd, Makiya - Kufa Charity, Round City Magazine, LWK + Partners, JT + Partners	annual	architect, recent graduates, person, organisations, projects, buildings, other	7 categories	
Thomas Jefferson Medal in Architecture	1966	Thomas Jefferson Foundation	annual	architect		
Venice Biennale of Architecture	1980	Venice Biennale	biennale	architect		
Wolf Prize in Arts	1981	Wolf Foundation	intermittent	architect		
World Architecture Festival	2008	EMAP	annual	architect, building	17 categories	
Wheelwright Prize	1935	Harvard Graduate School of Design	annual	architect		

== International ==
Name	Established	Sponsor	Frequency	Recipient	Notes	Ref.
American Architecture Awards	1994	The Chicago Athenaeum Museum of Architecture and Design, the European Centre for Architecture Art Design and Urban Studies	annual	architects		
American Prize for Architecture	1994	The Chicago Athenaeum Museum of Architecture and Design, the European Centre for Architecture Art Design and Urban Studies	annual	architects		
Architectural League Emerging Voices	1982	The Architectural League of New York	annual	architects		
European Prize for Architecture	2010	The European Centre for Architecture Art Design and Urban Studies and The Chicago Athenaeum Museum of Architecture and Design	annual	architect		
European Prize for Urban Public Space	2000	Centre de Cultura Contemporània de Barcelona	biennial	architect + promoter		
European Union Prize for Contemporary Architecture	1988	EU and Fundació Mies van der Rohe	biennial	building		
Forum AID Award	2006	Forum AID magazine, Sweden	annual	architect + building	2 other categories	
Heinrich Tessenow Medal	1963	Alfred Toepfer Foundation (Hamburg)	annual	architect		
Emirates Glass LEAF Award	2005	Leading European Architects Forum	annual	architect		
International Piranesi Award	1989	PiDA, Piran Days of Architecture, Slovenia	annual	architect	1 award, 2 recognitions, 1 student recognition	
Moira Gemmill Prize for Emerging Architecture	2016	The Architectural Review, Architects' Journal	annual	women who are using innovative architecture to effect positive social change	4 Shortlisted → 1 Winner + possibly 1 Highly Commended	

== International and national thematic ==
Name	Theme	Established	Sponsor	Region	Frequency	Recipient	Notes	Ref.
CTBUH Skyscraper Award	Skyscrapers	2002	Council on Tall Buildings and Urban Habitat	international	annual	building, architect		
Emporis Skyscraper Award	Skyscrapers	2000	Emporis magazine	international	annual	building		
The Daylight and Building Component Award	Daylighting	1980	The VELUX Foundation (Denmark)	international	intermittent	architect		
Driehaus Prize for Classical Architecture	New Classical Architecture, New Urbanism	2003	Richard H. Driehaus Foundation	international	annual	architect	$200,000 and a bronze prize	
Grand Prix de l'urbanisme	Urbanism	1989	French Ministry for Ecology, Energy, Sustainable Development and Planning	national	annual	urban planner		
MIPIM AR Future Projects Award	Projects	2002	MIPIM trade show & Architectural Review magazine	international	annual	building, architect	unbuilt or incomplete projects	
Outstanding Structure Award	Structure	2000	International Association for Bridge and Structural Engineering	international	annual	building	architect, contractor, engineer and owner	
RAIC Architectural Firm Award	Firms	2003	Royal Architectural Institute of Canada	national	annual	firm		
RAIC Urban Design Award	Urban design	2006	Royal Architectural Institute of Canada	national	biennial	individual/firm	urban design	
RAIC Prix du XXe siècle	20th century	2007	Royal Architectural Institute of Canada	national	annual	building	buildings 25–50 years old	
The Daylight Award	Daylight in architecture, Daylight research	2016	The VELUX Foundations (DK), VELUX Stiftung (CH)	global	biennial	architects, scientists		

== National ==
Name	Established	Sponsor	Frequency	Recipient	Notes	Ref,
Architecture Firm Award	1962	American Institute of Architects	annual	architect		
National Architecture Awards	1981	Australian Institute of Architects	annual	architect	10 categories	
Building of the Year Award	1994–2002	Royal Institute of British Architects	annual	building	preceded the Stirling Prize	
Building of the Year Award	2015	Honare Memari Institute	annual	building		
DBEW competition	2001	Hanssem corporation, Korea	intermittent	architect	Contemporary house	
Governor General's Medals in Architecture	2002	Royal Architectural Institute of Canada	biennial	architect		
Houen Foundation Award	1893	Norwegian Ministry of Culture	annual	building/architect		
Kasper Salin Prize	1962	Swedish Association of Architects	annual	building		
National Architecture Award of Spain	1932	Government of Spain	annual	architect		
National Design Awards	2000	Cooper-Hewitt, National Design Museum	annual	architect	13 other categories	
New Zealand Architecture Awards		New Zealand Institute of Architects	annual	architect		
P/A Awards	1953	Architect Magazine (formerly Progressive Architecture magazine)	annual	building	annual themes	
Prix de Rome	1720–1968	French Royal Academy of Architecture	intermittent	scholarship	Ended in 1968	
Prix de l'Équerre d'Argent	1986	Le Moniteur (France)	annual	architect	& building owner	
Prix de Rome (Belgium)	1832	Royal Academy of Fine Arts Antwerp	triennial	architect	3 other categories	
Prix de Rome (Canada)	1987	Canada Council for the Arts	annual	architect	1 other categories	
RAIC Gold Medal	1967	Royal Architectural Institute of Canada	annual	architect		
RIAI Triennial Gold Medal	1934	Royal Institute of the Architects of Ireland	triennial	building, architect		
RIAS Doolan Award	2002	Royal Incorporation of Architects in Scotland	annual	architect, building		
RIBA European Award	2005	Royal Institute of British Architects	annual	building, architect		
RIBA International Award	2007	Royal Institute of British Architects	annual	building, architect		
RAIA Gold Medal	1960	Australian Institute of Architects	annual	architect		
Robin Boyd Award	1981	Australian Institute of Architects	annual	house, architect		
Rome Prize	1905	American Academy in Rome	annual	artist, scholar		
Rudy Bruner Award for Urban Excellence	1987	Bruner Foundation	biennial	project		
SARP Award of the Year	1983	Association of Polish Architects	intermittent	building		
Stirling Prize	1996	Royal Institute of British Architects	annual	architect, building		
Twenty-five Year Award	1969	American Institute of Architects	annual	building	Any building designed by an American architect and located in any country is eligible.	
Vincent Scully Prize	1999	National Building Museum	annual	practice, scholarship or criticism		
Bilarab Bin Haitham Award for Architectural Design	2022	Bilarab bin Haitham Al Said	annual	project		
National Architecture Award of Chile	1969	Colegio de Arquitectos de Chile	biennial	architect		

== Students and Young Architects ==
Name	Established	Sponsor	Region	Frequency	Recipient	Notes	Ref.
AR Emerging Awards	1999	The Architectural Review	International	Annual	Young architects		
The Architectural League Prize	1981	Architectural League of New York	international	annual	graduates 10 years or less out of school	formerly known as the Young Architects Forum	
International VELUX Award for Students of Architecture	2004	VELUX (Denmark)	international	biennial	student	Daylighting	
MoMA PS1 Young Architects Program	1998	Museum of Modern Art in partnership with PS1 Contemporary Art Center	international	annual	young architect		
RAIC Young Architect Award	.	Royal Architectural Institute of Canada	national	annual	young architect		
RIAI Travelling Scholarship	1935	Royal Institute of the Architects of Ireland		annual	student		
RIBA President's Medals	1836	Royal Institute of British Architects	international	annual	student and graduates worldwide		

== Local ==
Award	Place	Country	Established	Frequency	Recipient	Ref.
Harleston Parker Medal	Boston, Massachusetts	United States				
Kent Design Awards	Kent County Council	United Kingdom	2000	biennial	architect and building owner	
Melbourne Prize	Melbourne	Australia	1996	annual	project and architect	
Pug Awards	Toronto	Canada				
Sarah Booth Conroy Prize	Washington, DC	United States	2016	annual	architecture critic	
Victorian Architecture Medal	Victoria	Australia	1987	annual	architect, project of the year	
Wilkinson Award	New South Wales	Australia	1961	annual	architect, house	

== See also ==
- List of design awards
