= James Carpenter (architect) =

American light artist and designer

- Born: 1949 (age 76–77)
- Education: Rhode Island School of Design
- Known for: light art
- Awards: MacArthur Fellows Program

James Carpenter (born 1949) is an American light artist and designer.

== Life ==
He graduated from the Rhode Island School of Design with a BFA in sculpture in 1972. He studied with Dale Chihuly.

He works at James Carpenter Design Associates. Carpenter was selected to design new public spaces and visitor amenities for the Israel Museum in Jerusalem.

== Awards ==
Carpenter has won a number of awards, including the Institute Honor Award, American Institute of Architects in 1991 and The Daylight and Building Component Award, by the VILLUM FONDEN # VELUX FONDEN (THE VELUX FOUNDATIONS) in 2009. He was also a member of the 2004 class of MacArthur Fellows.

== Works ==
- James Carpenter: environmental refractions, Authors Sandro Marpillero, James Carpenter, Kenneth Frampton, Princeton Architectural Press, 2006, ISBN 978-1-56898-608-1
