= Bianchini e Lusiardi associati =

Italian architecture firm

Bianchini e Lusiardi associati is an Italian architecture firm, mostly known as the winner of international architectural competitions, such as the New Cleopatra's Kiosk competition in London, managed by RIBA Competitions and the DBEW competition in Seoul, South Korea (2002). The firm's style is characterized by a modernistic use of artificial materials, like plastics and metals, often combined with ingenious lighting systems. The firm also owns the architecture magazine Inexhibit
