= Velfac =

Danish window company

Velfac A/S is a Danish company who produces windows for the building industry. The company is part of VKR Holding A/S, which also owns, among other things, Velux and Rationel. Velfac exports to several countries and has sales offices in Great Britain, Ireland, Sweden and Denmark. Velfac A/S is based in Ringkøbing and has over 1,000 employees and an annual turnover of just over £ 1.5 billion (2007)

== History ==
The company was established in 1952 by the V. Kann Rasmussen & Co., and has manufactured windows for homes and building projects since then. Who sent the first window on the market and later registered the names Velux and Velfac. Three years later opened Leif E. Hansen carpentry business in Ølstrup near Ringkøbing that barely ten years later began producing windows called Windows Ribo A/S. This company was in 1978 part of the V. Kann Rasmussen Company Group. Since then the company has expanded several times.

== Timeline ==
- 1952: V. Kann Ramus & Co. launches the first facade window.
- 1955: Leif E. Hansen starts a carpentry business in Ølstrup.
- 1962: Velfac registered as a trademark.
- 1963: Ribo windows created.
- 1978: Ribo windows become part of the VKR Group.
- 1985: Velfac 200 window comes into production.
- 1992: Company changes its name to VELFAC A/S.
- 1994: Velfac 400 introduced. (Real poor windows, dew provides mold and fungus)
- 2000: Factory in Ringkobing expanded by 8,000 sqm. VELFAC house in Nørresundby window opens.
- 2003: Window House is now in Nørresundby, Horsens, Herlev, Odense and Ringkøbing.
- 2004: Champion Window Velfac introduced.
- 2005: Window Velfac house in Aarhus opens.
- 2007: Window Velfac house in Hilleroed opens.

== Velfac motto ==
Villum Kann Rasmussen's motto of "one test is worth more than a thousand expert opinions" are still part of the company. The message is always trying something new and thus develop themselves and the company.

== V. Kann Rasmussen Foundation ==
A foundation set up by founder Villum Kann Rasmussen in 1991 to provide support for environmental projects. The foundation annually awards funding for projects dealing with climate change, unsustainable consumption, and loss of biodiversity. Fund applications are submitted through a Letter of Enquiry.

== Related links ==
- http://www.velfac.com
- da:VELFAC

Velfac 400 Velfac 400 poor windows, dew causes fungus problems
