= Cleopatra's Kiosk =

Building and shop in England

Coordinates: 51.5069°N 0.1219°W

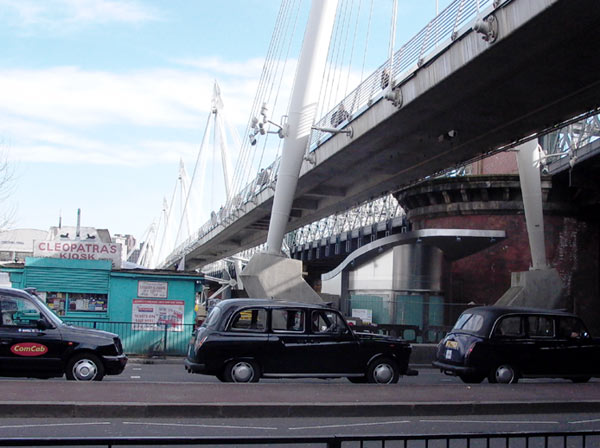
The old and the new Cleopatra's Kiosk during construction in 2007

Cleopatra's Kiosk is a small building and shop on the Victoria Embankment, London, under the Hungerford Bridge. Built in the late 1940s the old kiosk was replaced by a more modern structure in 2007.

== History ==
In May 1940 Commander Coakley took his two Thames 'little ships' to rescue men stranded on the beaches of Dunkirk. One little ship was lost and the other badly damaged. To enable Commander Coakley to earn a living after the war the Port of London Authority (PLA) rented him a small piece of land on the Victoria Embankment. It was here that Coakley erected a kiosk from which to sell tickets for riverboats.

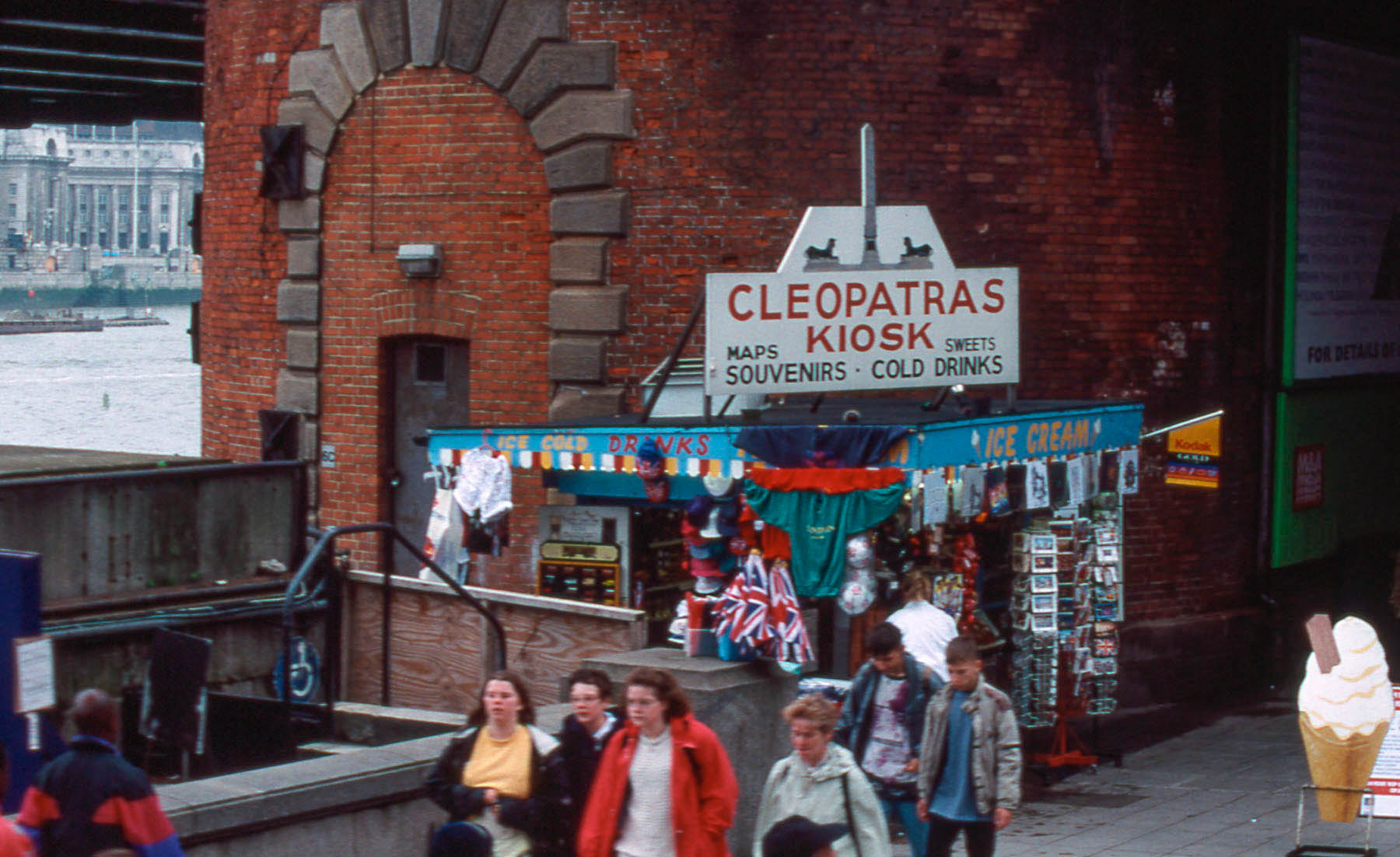
The kiosk in 1996

In 1960 Coakley wished to retire and contacted one of his relatives, Kate Stanton, to enquire if she would be willing to run the kiosk for him. Kate ran it with her other business interests for a year or two, and increased sales substantially. In 1964 Kate's daughter, Julia Stanton, took over the running of Cleopatra's Kiosk and has been there ever since. In 1998 it was reported that the kiosk had not been closed since shortly after the Second World War apart from Christmas Days.

To help construction of the Golden Jubilee pedestrian Bridge (Hungerford Bridge) Westminster City Council at first proposed that the kiosk should be removed and issued a compulsory purchase order but later agreed that the kiosk would be moved to a nearby temporary location to allow the business to continue whilst the footbridge construction works were in progress. Owing to the move, the fabric of the kiosk deteriorated.

== Architectural competition ==
It was agreed by Westminster City Council that the area between the base of the brick railway pier and the steps leading from Embankment pier through the listed river wall will be leased to Samuel Alexander Ltd (the owners of the kiosk). A new structure was planned to be designed and constructed on this site.

Following an international architectural design competition held in 2003 by RIBA Competitions, in which over 200 of the world's leading architects competed, the old kiosk was replaced by a new highly modernistic one designed by the Italian firm Bianchini e Lusiardi associati. It was completed in July 2007 with the cost of the project amounting to £160,000.

The site is located to the north west of the Golden Jubilee Bridge on the Victoria Embankment opposite the Embankment Tube Station.
