= Villum Foundation =

Nonprofit organization in Denmark

Coordinates: 55.7407°N 12.4804°E

The Villum Foundation (Danish: Villum Fonden; formerly Villum Kann Rasmussen Foundation, Villum Kann Rasmussen Fonden) was set up in 1971 by civil engineer Villum Kann Rasmussen (1909–1993). 10 years later, he set up the Velux Foundation (Velux Fonden). Rasmussen was the founder of VELUX and Velfac, Danish window companies. Both foundations are part of VKR Holding A/S, owned by the Rasmussen family and the Villum Foundation, which is the main shareholder.

The foundations fund scientific, cultural, artistic and social projects, and award honorary prizes. In 2018, they together granted EUR 118 million divided among 1,015 donations. The money comes from the revenues of the VKR Group and income generated by the foundations’ other assets.

== Grants ==
The foundations support large research activities in the technical and natural sciences, agricultural and veterinary sciences, the environment, and industrial research, providing money for payroll costs, running expenses and procurement of major research apparatus. The foundation supports research centres, the so-called “Centres of Excellence” with larger grants. The designation of the centres is made upon the initiative of the foundation.

Its visiting professor programme gives funds to Danish research institutions to permit leading professors from international universities to spend a period at Danish universities. Additionally, since 2001, the foundation has financed a postdoctoral program in the natural and technical sciences.

Beginning in 2006, it has donated a larger proportion of its grants to social and cultural projects outside Denmark, with a special focus on Hungary, Poland and other countries in Eastern and Central Europe.

The Velux Foundation is more narrowly focused. It has a program supporting citizens more than 60 years old who are actively engaged in activities of personal or common interest that contribute to maintaining their active lives. In addition, it supports research into diseases of the eye, diseases among the elderly, and living conditions for elderly people. It also supports larger research projects within the humanities, health and medical sciences.

== Awards ==
Each year the Foundation awards The Villum Kann Rasmussen Annual Award for Technical and Scientific Research to a Danish researcher. The award is the largest Danish research award.

The 2008 award was granted to Professor Anja Boisen, Department of Micro- and Nanotechnology, Technical University of Denmark, for her research in nanotechnology.

The 2009 awards marked the centenary celebration of Villum Kann Rasmussen. One went to Professor Eva Bjørn Vedel Jensen, Department of Mathematical Science Aarhus University, for research in mathematical and statistical methods for three-dimensional imaging of objects such as the brain from one or two-dimensional observations. The other went to Professor Jan Oskar Jeppesen, Department of Physics and Chemistry, University of Southern Denmark, for producing large and complex organic molecules with unique functional characteristics.
