= International VELUX Award for Students of Architecture =

International VELUX Award
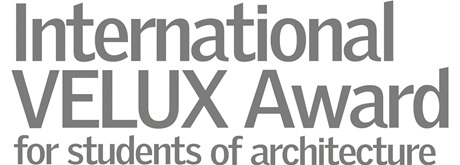
- Description: Award for students of architecture on the theme of sunlight and daylight
- Presented by: VELUX
- First award: 2004
- Website: iva.velux.com

The International VELUX Award is for students of architecture in the theme of sunlight and daylight. The award is biennial and was first presented in 2004.

The award is for completed works on any scale from a small scale component to large urban contexts or abstract concepts and experimentation. The award is presented by VELUX in close cooperation with the International Union of Architects (UIA) and the European Association for Architectural Education (EAAE).

== Description ==
“Light of Tomorrow” is the theme of the International VELUX Award. The award wants to challenge the future of daylight in the built environment. The award contains no specific categories and is in no way restricted to the use of VELUX products. The jury of the International VELUX Award comprises internationally recognized architects and other building professionals. Any registered student of architecture – individual or team – from all over the world may participate in the award. The award wants to acknowledge not only the students but their teachers as well. Therefore, all students must be backed and granted submission by a teacher from a school of architecture.

== History ==
The first International VELUX Award took place in 2004. 760 students from 194 schools in 34 countries in Europe registered, and 258 students from 106 schools in 27 countries submitted their projects. The international jury led by Glenn Murcutt selected three winners and eight honourable mentions, who were announced at the Award event held in Paris.

== 2004 winners ==
In 2004 the first prize went to Norwegian student Claes Heske Ekornås for his project “Light as matter”. In 2004, ten winners were announced at the Award event in Paris.

== 2006 winners ==
In 2006, the award went global – inviting students from all over the world to participate. The number of submissions more than doubled reaching 557 projects from 225 schools in 53 countries. The international jury led by Per Olaf Fjeld decided to award three winners and 17 honourable mentions, and they were all celebrated at the Award event at the Guggenheim Museum in Bilbao, Spain.

Louise Groenlund of Denmark won the International VELUX Award for her project ”A museum of photography”. Twenty winners and honourable mentions were announced at the Award event at the Guggenheim Bilbao in November 2006.

== 2008 winners ==
Rank	Project name	Student Names	Affiliations	Country
1st Place	Embodied Ephemerality	Reilly O’Neil Hogan	Cornell University	USA
2nd Place	Interface repairing	Ruan Hau; Xiong Xing	Tsinghua University	China
3rd Place	Light has a body	Dean Carlo MacGregor	Lusíada University	Portugal

== 2010 winners ==
Rank	Project name	Student Names	Affiliations	Country
1st Place	Constellation of Light Field	Young-Gook Park; Kim Dea Hyun; Choi Jin Kyu; Kim Won	Hanyang University	South Korea
2nd Place	Variational Sunlight Influences	Ma Xin; Wang Rui; Yang Meng	Tianjin University	China
3rd Place	Lightscape between gaps	Joe Wu	Delft University of Technology	Netherlands

== 2016 winners ==
The continental winners of Daylight in Buildings

Region	Project name	Student Names	Affiliations	Country
Africa	Shelter.Light'	Fatai Osundiji; Emmanuel Ayoloto	Obafemi Awolowo University	Nigeria
The Americas	No parking..Let there be light	Enzo Piero Vergara Vaccia	Universidad Central	Chile
Asia & Oceania	Redistribution of Light	Kwang Hoon Lee; Hyuk Sung Kwon; Yu Min Park	Korea University	South Korea
Eastern Europe & the Middle East	Light Scattering Window	Kamil Głowacki; Marta Sowińska; Łukasz Gąska	University of Technology	Poland
Western Europe	Ceremonial Room Copenhagen	Eskild Pedersen	The Royal Danish Academy	Denmark

The continental winners of Daylight Investigations

Region	Project name	Student Names	Affiliations	Country
Africa	Light and Shadow	Ahmed Zorgui; Ala Eddin Noumi	University in Carthage	Tunesia
The Americas	Automated Blind Study	Amir Nezamdoost; Alen Mahic; Malak Modaresnezhad	University of Idaho	USA
Asia & Oceania	Light for the blind	Jiafeng Li; Chenlu Wang; Guiding Yao; Jiebei Yang; Lushan Ao; Xiaoqi Chen; Jiawen Li	Huazhong University	China
Eastern Europe & the Middle East	A quenchless light	Anna Andronova	Kazan State University	Russia
Western Europe	Hammershøi's Grammar	Nicholas Shurey	The Royal Danish Academy	Denmark

== 2018 winners ==
The continental winners of Daylight Investigations

Region	Project name	Student Names	Affiliations	Country
The Americas	Daylight to Water	John Nguyen; Stephen Baik; Abubakr Bajaman	University of Toronto	Canada
Asia & Oceania	Road to Light'	Yuhan Luo; Di Lan; Yusong Liu	Tianjin University	China
Eastern Europe & the Middle East	Cloud of the Polar Light	Anna Borisova; Kamilla Akhmetovastasia	Kazan State University	Russia
Western Europe	Cover to Reveal	Brice Lemaire; Xialan Vandendries; Julien Obedia	Université Catholique de Louvain	Belgium

The continental winners of Daylight in Buildings

Region	Project name	Student Names	Affiliations	Country
Africa	Light Pavilion	Fatai Osundiji; Emmanuel Ayo-loto	Obafemi Awolowo University	Nigeria
The Americas	Light Liquefaction	Ziqi Chen; Shuaizhong Wang; Zeyu Liu	University of Virginia	USA
Asia & Oceania	My Dead Relative in the Light	Qi Wang; Jingkai Chen; Peilin Yin	Qingdao University of Technology	China
Eastern Europe & the Middle East	Light Forms Juggler	Anastasia Maslova	Kazan State University	Russia
Western Europe	Reaching the Light	Joana Robalo; João Umbelino; Ana Ázar; António Lopes; Miguel Pedro	Universidade de Évora	Portugal

== 2020 winners ==
The continental winners of Daylight Investigations

Region	Project name	Student Names	Affiliations	Country
Africa	Let There Be Light	Emmanuel Ayo-loto; John Ogungefun	Obafemi Awolowo University	Nigeria
The Americas	Air Quality Index	Mina Onay; Richard Schutte	University of Toronto	Canada
Asia & Oceania	Light Therapy	Qianqian Zhou; Gezi Li; Zhu Chen; Fengming Li; Lurui Lyu	Beijing Jiatong University	China
Eastern Europe & the Middle East	The Theater of Light	Julia Giżewska; Dominik Kowalski; Paweł Białas	Silesian University of Technology	Poland
Western Europe	Words to Light	Xingyu Chen; Matteo, Giglio; Ghil Meynard; Noëlie Seguet-Pey; Nicolas Salha; Raphaël Pletinckx; Hiba Nasser; Ghil Meynard	Université Catholique de Louvain	Belgium

The continental winners of Daylight in Buildings

Region	Project name	Student Names	Affiliations	Country
Africa	A Million Little Lights	Michali Jameson	Greenside Design Centre, College of Design	South Africa
The Americas	Bright Roots	Alejandro Satt	Universidad Andrés Bello	Chile
Asia & Oceania	Ink and Light	Mingjie Guo; Jingwen Yang; Cong Liu; Ziyong Mou	Xi'an University of Architecture and Technology	China
Eastern Europe & the Middle East	SUNCITY	Alperen Temur; Nasibe Nur Dündar; Nijat Mahamaliyev; Ezgi Üzümcü	Istanbul Teknik Üniversitesi	Turkey
Western Europe	Solar Desalination Skylight	Henry Glogau	Royal Danish Academy of Fine Arts	Denmark

== 2022 Winners ==
The continental winners of Daylight Investigations

Region	Project name	Student Names	Affiliations	Country
Africa	Limitless Daylight	Ishimwe Munyande	The University of Rwanda	Rwanda
The Americas	Martian Light	Gray Burke	University of Miami	USA
Asia & Oceania	Under the Three Gorges Project	Yawen Qiao	Southwest Jiaotong University	China
Eastern Europe & the Middle East	Flight	Sajjad Navidi; Mahya Sadr; Elham Bahadori	Rima Fayaz and Maryam Fakhari	Iran
Western Europe	Solar Hymnal	Jaan Gröndahl	Metro University of Applied Sciences	Finland

The continental winners of Daylight in Buildings

Region	Project name	Student Names	Affiliations	Country
Africa	Aqua Mart	Elmarie van Staden	Greenside Design Centre	South Africa
The Americas	24-Hour Daylight	Adrian Herrera; Melissa Merino; Kevin Males	Universidad central del Ecuador	Ecuador
Asia & Oceania	Lighting up, Neighbourhood Hop	Feng Meiyin; Feng Yijun; Zhang Jinru	Beijing Jiaotong University	China
Eastern Europe & the Middle East	Time Indicate Protection	Zuzanna Sazonow; Aleksandra Pytka	Politechnika Poznańska	Poland
Western Europe	Spotlight Tree	Zhao Liuxin; Liu Wanchen; Xin Guanbai; Dong Zhenbin	University of Sheffield	United Kingdom
