= The Model home 2020 project =

Finding the answers to the challenges: CO_{2} reduction, liveability improvement and limited energy resources
- What: Six climate-neutral demo-houses
- Where: Denmark, Austria, Germany, France, UK
- How: Based on Active House principles

The model home 2020 project is a vision for climate neutral buildings with a high degree of liveability. The project was started in 2009 and involves the construction of six houses in five countries across Europe.

Each building in the project is designed to reflect and respond to the different climatic, cultural and architectural conditions of the countries in which they are built. After completion the houses are open to the public during a test period of 6–12 months after which they are sold. Each house is monitored during the test period to learn how the experiments turn out in real-life conditions.

The learnings will be shared openly with other projects, industry experts and contractors to create synergy effects in the building industry's effort to come up with solutions for sustainable buildings.

The houses in Denmark were built in 2009, those in Germany and Austria were built in 2010 and those in the UK and France are scheduled for completion in 2011.

== Background ==
The Active House Alliance has developed a set of principles for "active house" construction, which focuses on achieving a balance between energy, indoor climate and the environment. The model home 2020 project is in full accordance with the active house principles.

The project is backed by the VELUX Group in cooperation with multiple local and regional governments, suppliers, architects, engineers and researchers. The model home 2020 project tests how the active house principles perform under real-life conditions. The knowledge derived from the projects will be documented and used to take an active part in developing sustainable buildings.

== The projects ==
- Experiment # 1 Home for Life in Denmark built in 2009. Home for Life is a visionary proposal for the family home of the future. The building is the result of an interdisciplinary project to incorporate the issues of energy consumption, comfort and visual appeal into a holistic entity, with these parameters being mutually complementary and maximising quality of life in the home and the world around it.
- Experiment # 2 Green Lighthouse in Denmark built in 2009. Green Lighthouse is Denmark's first public carbon-neutral building. It was developed in a strategic partnership between the University of Copenhagen, the VELUX Group, VELFAC, the Danish University and Property Agency and the Municipality of Copenhagen. The underlying vision of the project is to erect a beacon showing the way towards climate-neutral buildings of the future that provide the best indoor climate with masses of daylight and fresh air to the benefit of the residents' health and comfort.
- Experiment # 3 Sunlighthouse in Austria built in 2010. Sunlighthouse will be Austria's first carbon-neutral, single-family home. The vision is to build a house with exciting and appealing architecture focusing on the sloping roof. The house must be generally affordable and therefore meet certain specifications of dimensions, material and appearance. Sunlighthouse provides an exceptionally high proportion of daylight and will achieve a positive energy balance by reducing its overall energy consumption and by using renewable energy.
- Experiment # 4 LichtAktiv Haus in Germany built in 2010. LichtAktiv Haus is the first CO_{2}-neutral modernisation of a so-called Siedlerhaus, a semi-detached house from the 1950s located in the Wilhelmsburg district of Hamburg The innovative modernisation strategy combines maximum liveability with optimum energy efficiency. The once tight and closed structure of the building has been transformed into spacious rooms with high levels of daylight, providing occupants with the best living comfort. Natural ventilation ensures a healthy indoor climate. The goal now is self-sufficiency in energy.
- Experiment # 5 CarbonLight Homes in UK opened during 2011. CarbonLight homes are the first new home in the UK designed and built to the new UK Government definition of zero carbon. They are designed to be real homes for real people with construction techniques suitable for use by mass house builders. CarbonLight Homes use nature in an intelligent way to maximise daylight and encourage a sustainable lifestyle. The design is open plan and incorporates high levels of daylight and natural ventilation intended to minimise energy consumption among residents and generate a sense of community. The homes show that common-sense design can be used to create inspirational sustainable houses that can be easily replicated by UK house builders.
- Experiment # 6 Maison Air et Lumière in France opened during 2011. Maison Air et Lumière is a new generation of active homes that puts the quality of life of its inhabitants at the centre of its environmental approach. The unique features of the house lie in intelligent use of the sloping roof to combine well-being and energy efficiency. The architectural concept is based on different roof pitches that increase its ability to capture sunlight, making it an energy-positive home.

== The challenges ==
The European Union (EU) has adopted a comprehensive package for European energy policy up to 2020. It entails EU member states reducing their total energy consumption and CO_{2} emissions by 20 percent. Moreover, all EU member states must show that 20 percent of their total energy consumption comes from renewable energy sources. According to EU statistics:

- People in the EU spend 90 percent of the time indoors.
- Buildings consume more than 40 percent of the EU's total energy consumption.
- Up to 30 percent of the buildings within the EU do not provide a healthy indoor climate.
