= RIBA Competitions =

RIBA Competitions is the Royal Institute of British Architects' unit dedicated to organising architectural and other design-related competitions.

Architectural design competitions are used by an organisation that plans to build a new building or refurbish an existing building. They can be used for buildings, engineering work, structures, landscape design projects or public realm artworks. A competition typically asks for architects and/or designers to submit a design proposal in response to a given brief. The winning design will then be selected by an independent jury panel of design professionals and client representatives. The independence of the jury is vital to the fair conduct of a competition.

The objective of a competition is to explore a range of different design options to select the best response to the design brief, which would not be possible by pre-selecting one architect.

The competitions process is often used to generate new ideas, create blue-sky thinking, stimulate debate, raise the profile of the project and allow an opportunity for emerging talent to grow as well as established design practices.

== History ==
In 1871 the RIBA appointed a special committee to draw up the first set of model rules and regulations for competitions. A Competitions Committee was set up in 1883 to monitor competitions and a revised version of the rules and regulations was published at this time.

In 1967 the RIBA set up a Competitions Working Group who decided not just to monitor competitions but actively promote them and persuade clients to use them. From 1971 onwards a permanent Competitions Office was established at the RIBA.

RIBA Competitions is the only organisation in the UK who has maintained a steady flow of competitions as part of the normal working environment and to have studied the competition system in depth.

== Project list ==
RIBA Competitions has been responsible for delivering some of the most high-profile building projects in the UK and abroad through competition, such as:

=== Civic and Commercial ===
- Bourne Hill Council Offices, Salisbury
- Cleopatra's Kiosk
- Gateway Plus (previously known as "Birmingham Gateway")
- Manchester Civil Justice Centre
- RIBA Bar
- Senedd (also known as "National Assembly for Wales")
- Toyota (GB) Ltd Headquarters
- New Islington Footbridge
- 76 Portland Place

=== Culture, sport and leisure ===
- Avenham Park Pavilion
- Baltic Centre for Contemporary Art
- Banbury Museum
- Brockholes Nature Reserve Visitor Centre
- Courtyard, Hereford
- London Velopark (also known as London 2012 Velodrome)
- Maidstone Museum - East Wing extension
- Manchester Art Gallery
- National Centre for Popular Music (now known as Sheffield Hallam University students' union)
- National Maritime Museum Cornwall
- National Waterfront Museum
- Newlyn Art Gallery
- The Collection Lincoln
- The Hepworth Wakefield
- The MAC Belfast
- The Sage Gateshead
- The Whitworth Art Gallery, Manchester
- The Novium Museum
- The Wilson Art Gallery & Museum
- The Leventis Gallery

=== Education, health and the community ===
- Campuses of the University of Nottingham Jubilee Campus, University of Nottingham
- Corpus Christi College Auditorium
- Evelina Children's Hospital
- James Allen's Community Music School
- St Thomas' Hospital re-cladding
- Kentish Town Health Centre
- London School of Economics, Saw Swee Hock Student Centre
- City and Islington College
- Bishop Edward King Chapel

=== Housing and regeneration ===
- Clayfield Affordable Homes
- Redevelopment of JCB's Heavy Products site
- Timber Wharf

=== Public realm, artworks and structures ===
- Halley Research Station
- Infinity Bridge
- Kielder Observatory
- Millennium Bridge (London)
- Pylon Design Competition
- The Halo, Rossendale
- The Royal Parks Foundation - Drinking Fountains
- BBC Listening Project
- RIBA Lounge MIPIMUK 2014
- Grand Designs Live 2015
