= DBEW competition =

Architecture competition held in Seoul

The DBEW competition (Design Beyond East and West) is an architectural competition, organized by the Hanssem corporation, a south-Korean furniture company, which has been held in Seoul from 2001 to 2005. The main purpose of the competition is to let designers from all over the world express their idea about a contemporary house inspired by the life in the Far-east over-crowded cities, where flats need to be as small as possible.

In the 3rd edition more than 500 designers took part in the competition, which was one of the first to be run completely on the internet. The jury members were prominent international architects, such as Alessandro Mendini, Arata Isozaki and Shigeru Uchida.

In 2006 the competition was not held but a 6th edition is scheduled for 2007.

== Winners of the competition by year ==
- 2001 - Leonardo Bonanni, Joy Wang (USA)
- 2002 - Bianchini e Lusiardi associati (Italy)
- 2003 - Prof. Zhang Yue, Cheng Xiao Xi, Xu Jie, Tao Lei, Zheng Yue Yuan, Feng Jie (China)
- 2004 - Luca Donner, Francesca Sorcinelli (Italy)
- 2005 - Babak Taghikhani (Iran)
