= The Daylight and Building Component Award =

- Sponsored by: The VELUX Foundation
- Date: Around the first of March each year
- Location: Hørsholm
- Country: Denmark
- Reward: 100,000 Euro
- First award: 1980
- Website: veluxfoundations.dk/en/awards/daylight-award

The Daylight and Building Component Award is presented annually to an individual, or group of individuals, who have contributed significantly to the technical, social, artistic or design-related understanding of daylight. Previous awardees include architects, scientists, artists and building professionals, and the award carries with it a prize of 100,000 Euro. The award was established in 1980 and is given by the VELUX Foundation.

== History ==
Upon its establishment in 1980, the Daylight and Building Component Award was given to Danish citizens who had made a significant contribution to the understanding and practical use of daylight. In the early years, this meant that many of the recipients were architects or artists, many of whom had worked with daylight in an architectural or design context. Jørn Utzon, one of the most famous Danish Architects of the 20th century, was among the group awarded the first year. Through the next twenty-five years, the award was given intermittently, often to larger groups of individuals. In 2006, the award was given to the father-son team of architects Povl Wilhelm Wohlert and Claus Ditlev Wohlert.

In 2008, was converted to an annual award with four categories:

1. Daylighting design
2. Contribution to the science of daylighting
3. Contribution to awareness or interest about daylighting.
4. Contribution to the awareness of the industrial building component's importance, value and practical use in the everyday life

The monetary prize was also doubled in 2008 to 100,000 Euro, making it one of the largest of its kind within the architecture and building communities worldwide.

In 2010, the award was given to American architect James Carpenter, whose recent projects include the design of 7 World Trade Center, the first building to be reconstructed at the site since Sept. 11, 2001.

The award is given around the first of March each year at a ceremony in Hørsholm, Denmark.

== List of recipients ==
Year	Name	Country	Comments
1980	Jørn Utzon	Denmark	Architect.
1980	Jens Urup Jensen	Denmark	Painter
1980	Knud Thomsen	Denmark	Architect
1980	Erik Flagsted Rasmussen	Denmark	Architect
1987	Holger Jensen	Denmark	
1987	Henning Larsen	Denmark	Architect
1988	Per Sten Hebsgaard	Denmark	Glass Artist
1988	Torben Hjort	Denmark	Architect
1988	Sven Åge Larsen	Denmark	Ceramic Artist
1988	Niels Frithiof Truelsen	Denmark	Architect
2000	H.N.Brandt	England	Manager
2005	Jørgen Troelsen	Denmark	Engineer
2005	Michel Langrand	France	Manager
2005	István Kónya	Hungary	Manager
2006	Povl Wilhelm Wohlert	Denmark	Architect
2006	Claus Ditlev Wohlert	Denmark	Architect
2008	Richard Perez	US/France	Scientist
2009	Karl Lenhardt	Germany	Inventor
2010	James Carpenter	US	Architect
2011	Anne Lacaton & Jean-Philippe Vassal	France	Architects

== See also ==
- List of architecture prizes

== External links and sources ==
- The VELUX FOUNDATIONS
- Louisiana Museum of Modern Art
- Sydney Opera House
- The National Assembly of Kuwait
- Wohlert Arkitekter
- Utzon Center
- Hebsgaard Glaskunst
- Henning Larsen Architects
- James Carpenter Design Associates
- 7 World Trade Center
