= VELUX =

Danish window manufacturer

VELUX A/S

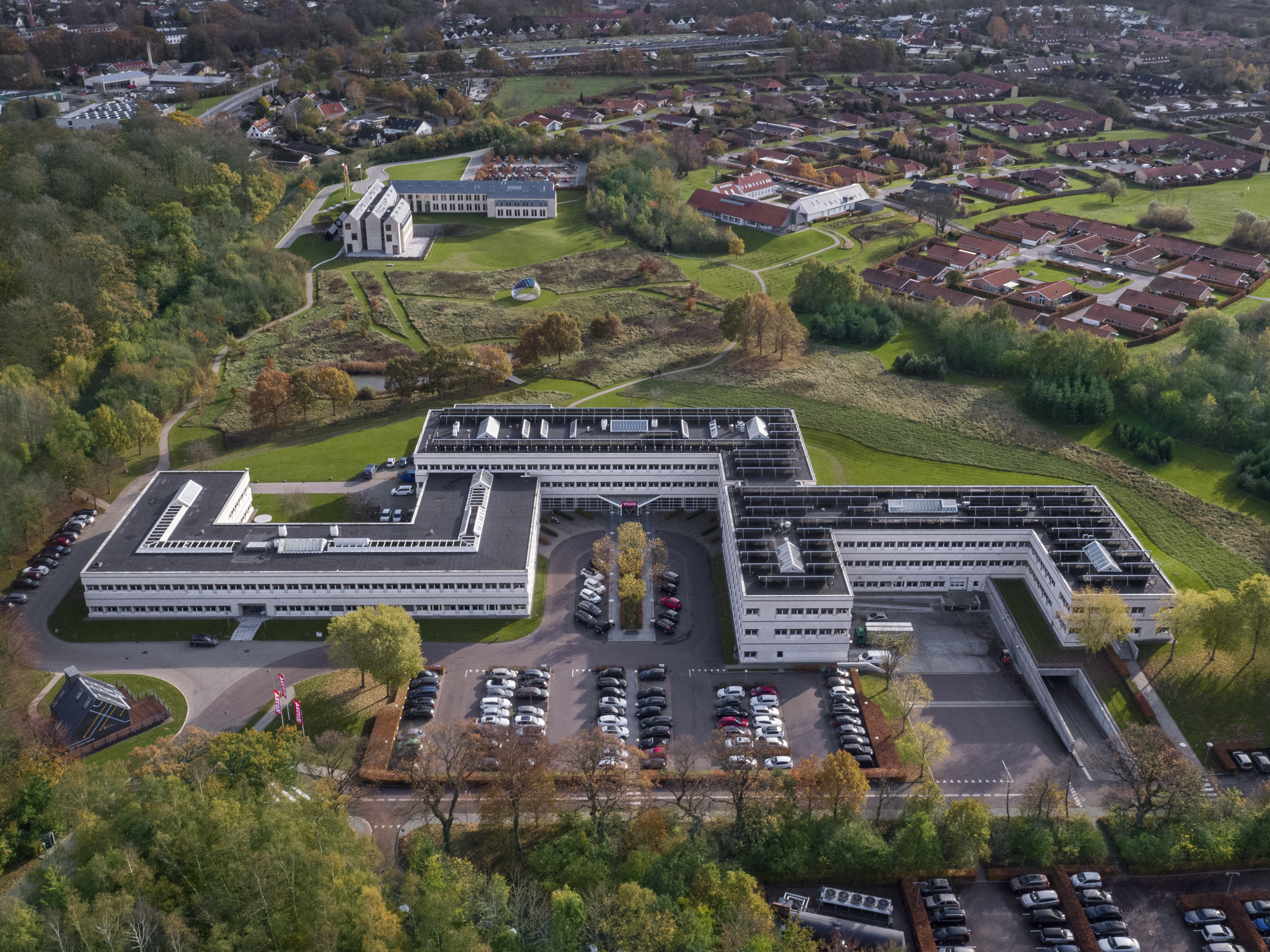
- Aerial view of the VELUX campus in Hørsholm
- Type: Private limited company
- Industry: Skylights
- Founded: 1941; 85 years ago
- Founder: Villum Kann Rasmussen
- Headquarters: Hørsholm, Denmark
- Key people: Lars Petersson (CEO); Anders Götzsche (EVP and CFO); Tina Mayn (EVP Products & Innovation); Iben Schmidt Helbirk (EVP People & Organisation); Raffaella Berardo (EVP Region Southwest Europe); Anders Dam Vestergaard (EVP Region North America, CEE, APAC & Altaterra); Barnabas Szabo (EVP Operations & Supply); Nicklas Dyg (EVP Strategy & Sales Development); Jørgen Jensen (Chairman)
- Number of employees: 12,000 (2025)
- Parent: VKR Holding A/S (100%)
- Website: velux.com

VELUX A/S is a Danish manufacturing company that specialises in roof windows, skylights, sun tunnels and related accessories, such as blinds, shutters, sunshades and mosquito nets. The company was founded in 1941 by Villum Kann Rasmussen. The company is headquartered in Hørsholm, Denmark, and is a part of VKR Holding A/S. VELUX Group is a founding partner of the global Active House Alliance.

The name VELUX is a combination of 'VE', short for ventilation, and the Latin 'LUX' meaning light.

== History ==
=== 1941–1950s: Founding and early years ===
The VELUX Group traces its origins to 1941, when civil engineer Villum Kann Rasmussen founded V. Kann Rasmussen & Co. in Copenhagen, Denmark, specializing in glass roofs. In 1942, he was commissioned to supply roof windows for Slagelse Vestre school in Zealand, where attics were being converted into classrooms. The Danish Ministry of Education required that these new classrooms provide access to natural light and ventilation.

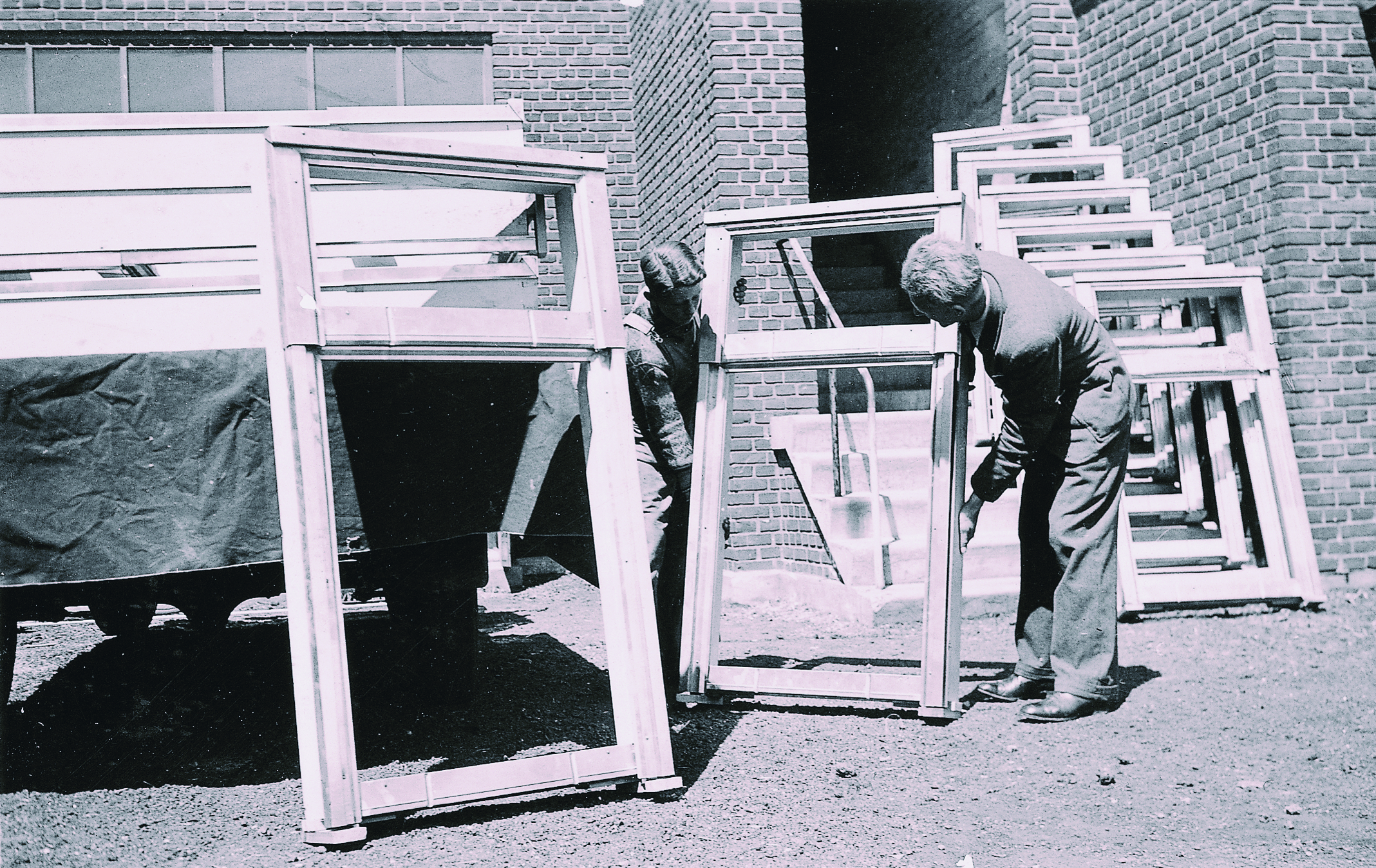
Installation of roof windows at the Slagelse Vestre School in Zealand, Denmark, 1942

To meet this demand, Kann Rasmussen developed a roof window comparable in quality to traditional vertical windows. The design combined a wooden frame with external zinc cladding to improve durability and weather resistance. He named his windows “Standard” because they were made in standard sizes that fit normal rafter spacing in Denmark. However, on the first invoice, he wrote the name VELUX – derived from "ventilation" and lux, the Latin word for light. VELUX was registered as a trademark in Denmark on October 3, 1942.

Early VELUX windows enabled the conversion of attic spaces into habitable rooms during a time when new housing construction was restricted due to the Second World War. In 1945, Kann Rasmussen introduced a pivot hinge and tilting sash design that allowed cleaning from the inside, securing patents for these innovations in 1948 and 1949.

Production initially relied on subcontractors in Copenhagen, but in 1946 Kann Rasmussen established manufacturing in Østbirk, supported by family investment. In 1950, the company assumed full ownership of the Østbirk facility, which became A/S Østbirk Bygningsindustri and was gradually industrialized through the 1950s.

=== 1950s–1990s: International expansion in Europe ===
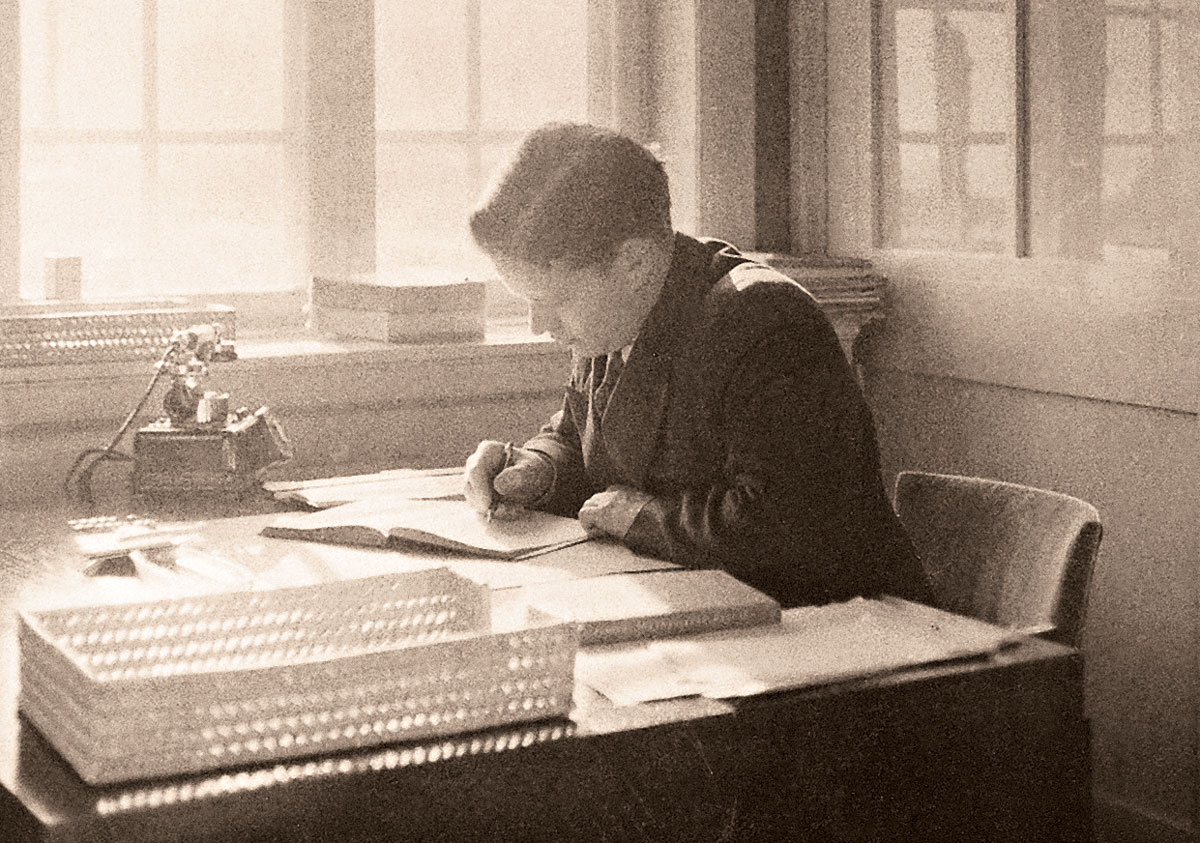
Villum Kann Rasmussen in his studio

VELUX expanded internationally through licensing agreements and subsidiaries. In 1942, the company entered the Swedish market through a partnership with Icopal’s local branch, later marketing products under the name SVITA.

In 1952, Kann Rasmussen established cooperation with the German firm ALDRA, co-founding a sales company in Hamburg. ALDRA produced windows for the German market under license, while fittings and technical expertise were supplied from Denmark. Income from the growing German business financed further expansion.

In 1954, a subsidiary was established in the United Kingdom, followed by operations in France and Austria in 1964. By 1970, VELUX employed around 1,000 people across 13 countries.

During the late 1960s, the company developed a new hinge system for steep roofs such as French mansards, which had slopes of about 70 degrees. The resulting VELUX GGL window, launched in 1968, incorporated several new features including a top-operated control bar, ventilation flap, friction mechanism, and in-house produced double glazing. The GGL model was introduced in Germany in 1969, where it achieved significant commercial success.

VELUX entered the United States market in 1975, establishing a sales company in Boston and later a production facility in Greenwood, South Carolina in 1978–1979. Expansion followed in Japan (1981) and Eastern Europe (from 1986), beginning with Hungary. During the 1990s, operations extended throughout Central and Eastern Europe, South America, Asia, and Australia.

In these years, the product portfolio expanded from a single product to a full range, including top-hung roof windows, roller shutters, electric-powered windows, and sun-screening products.

=== 1960s–1980s: Generational changes and values ===
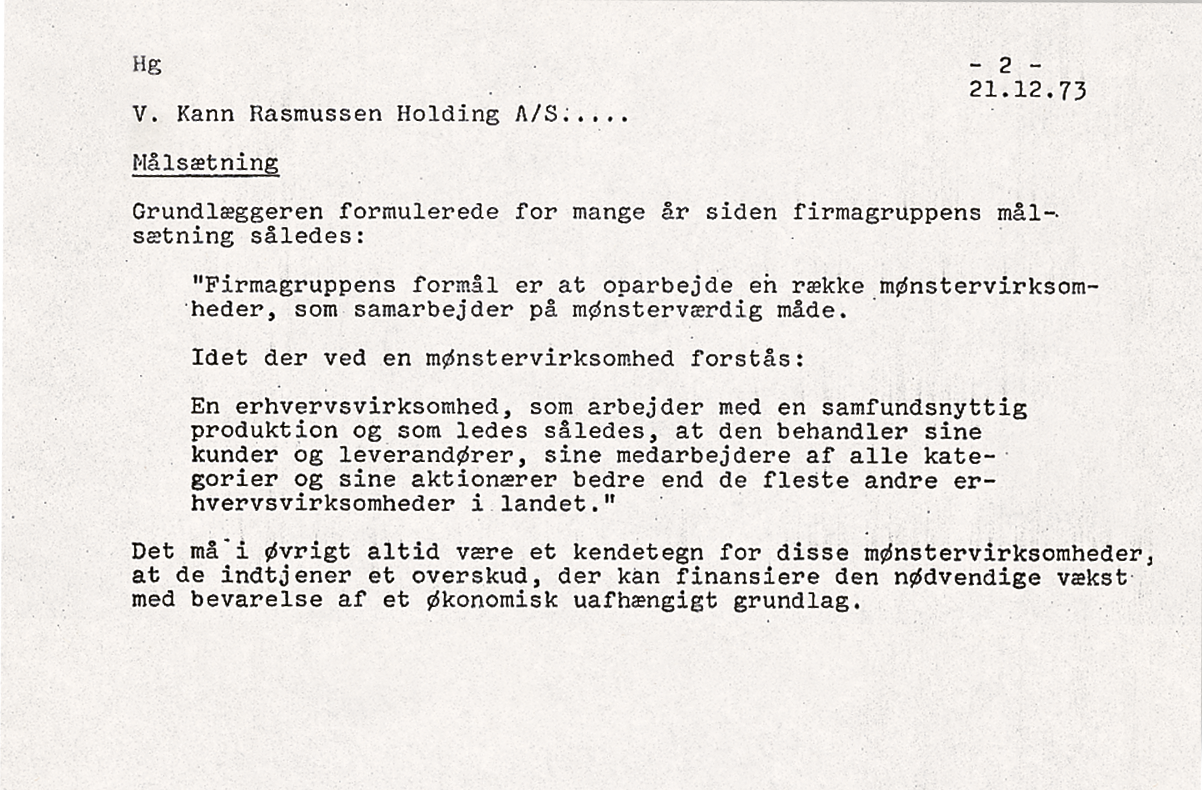
Mission statement of Model Company Objective by V. Kann Rasmussen Holding A/S from 1973

By the mid-1960s, Villum Kann Rasmussen had begun to consider succession. In 1965, Villum Kann Rasmussen formulated the Model Company Objective by which the VELUX Group committed itself to producing products "that were useful to society" and to "treating its customers, suppliers, employees of all categories and shareholders better than most companies".

In 1973, the statement was amended to include that a "model company" must also generate profits to ensure economic growth and independence. It was an attempt to pass on the values Villum Kann Rasmussen had lived by to future leaders and employees.

In 1971, the Villum Foundation (originally named the VELUX Foundation) was founded as the main shareholder. As the company grew and needed to make more donations, a new foundation, the VELUX Foundation, was established in 1981. Foundation activities were expanded with the Swiss VELUX Stiftung in 1980 and the V. Kann Rasmussen Foundation (USA) in 1991. That same year, an employee foundation for the VKR Group was established.

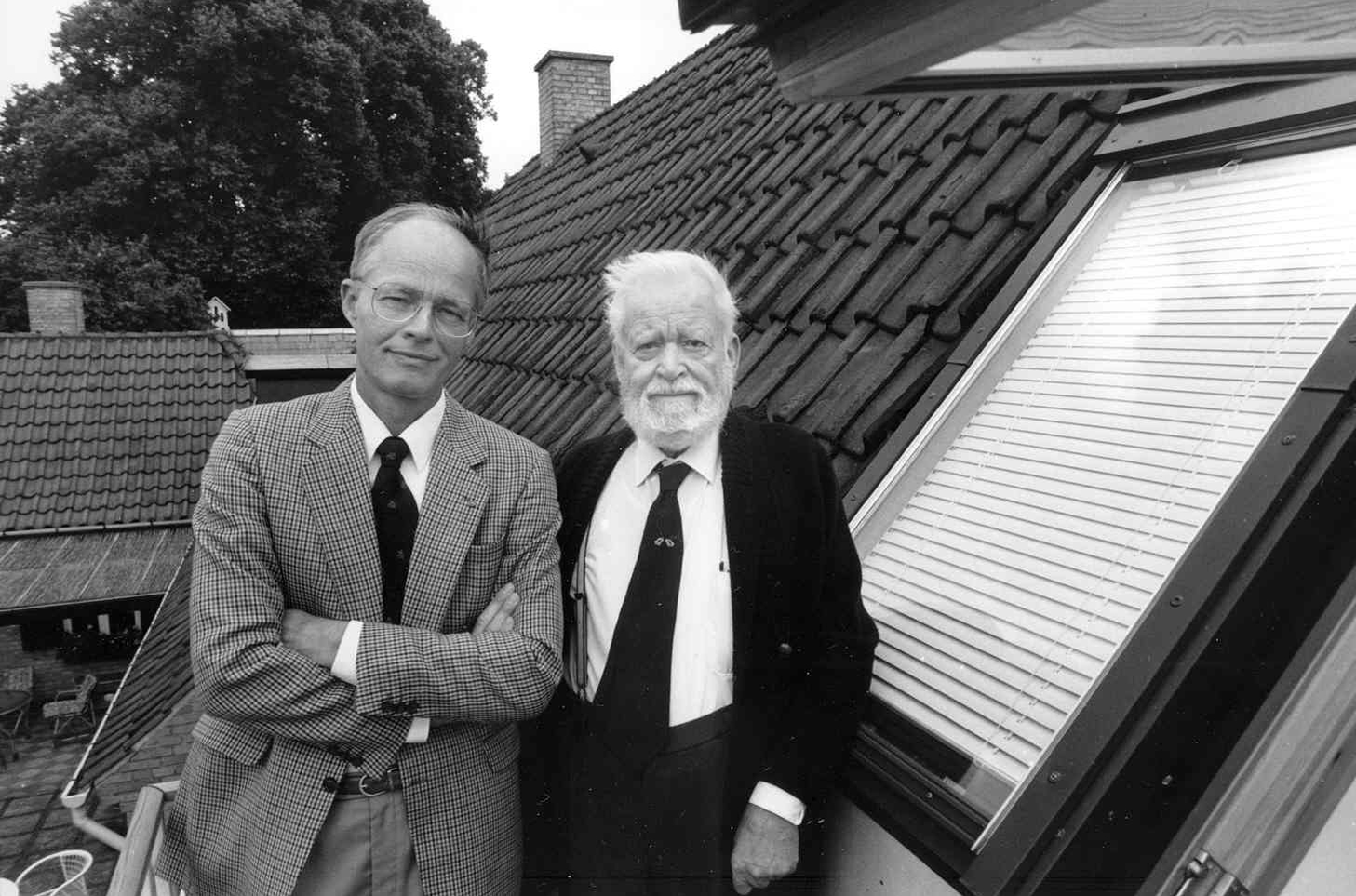
Villum Kann Rasmussen and his son Lars Kann-Rasmussen

In 1992, Villum Kann Rasmussen's eldest son, Lars Kann-Rasmussen, born in 1939, took over from Villum, who chaired the management of V. Kann Rasmussen Industri – the parent company of the VELUX Group.

Lars Kann-Rasmussen continued his father's life's work. Trained as an engineer, he began as an assistant at VELUX France in 1964. After a post in Germany, he became managing director of the company Dansk VELUX A/S in 1971, later in the 1970s taking charge of sales and product development for the international VELUX business.

Villum Kann Rasmussen passed away in 1993, aged 84. He lived to see his one-man company from 1941 grow into a major international group with solid market shares and a clarified ownership structure.

=== 1990s–2020s: Modern era ===
Under Lars Kann-Rasmussen's leadership, VELUX evolved into a modern global company, expanding production capacity and introducing energy-efficient designs.

Around 1990, he began emphasizing sustainability, leading to the establishment of an Environmental Committee in Søborg in the mid-1990s. The committee's goal was to promote and coordinate environmental initiatives across the VKR Group.

In 1997, the Our Shared Vision strategy was launched at the first VELUX World Conference, focusing on improving living conditions under sloped roofs. In 2001, VELUX A/S became the parent company for all VELUX activities, while VKR Holding A/S continued as parent company of the wider VKR Group. In 2002, VELUX acquired its long-time German partner ALDRA's operations, consolidating production and sales.

In the 2000s, the VELUX Group launched a series of animated television commercials titled Toys to highlight themes of daylight and fresh air.

In 2005, the VELUX Group introduced a corporate vision statement: "To lead the development of better living environments with daylight and fresh air through the roof." The vision reflected an emphasis on natural daylight, ventilation, and the company's role in improving indoor living conditions.

In 2009, the Model Home 2020 project began. It is a vision for climate neutral buildings with a high degree of liveability. It involved the construction of six different houses in five countries across Europe.

In 2012, the VELUX Group stepped into the commercial, non-residential market by launching VELUX Modular Skylights. To grow its commercial division, VELUX made three acquisitions in 2018: Wasco Products Inc., also known as Wasco Skylights, one of America's oldest and largest skylight manufacturers; JET-Group, a leading European supplier of daylight solutions, ventilation products and smoke and heat exhaust ventilation systems; and Vitral, which sells skylights and glass-roof systems in Denmark and England. In 2019, VELUX Commercial was established.

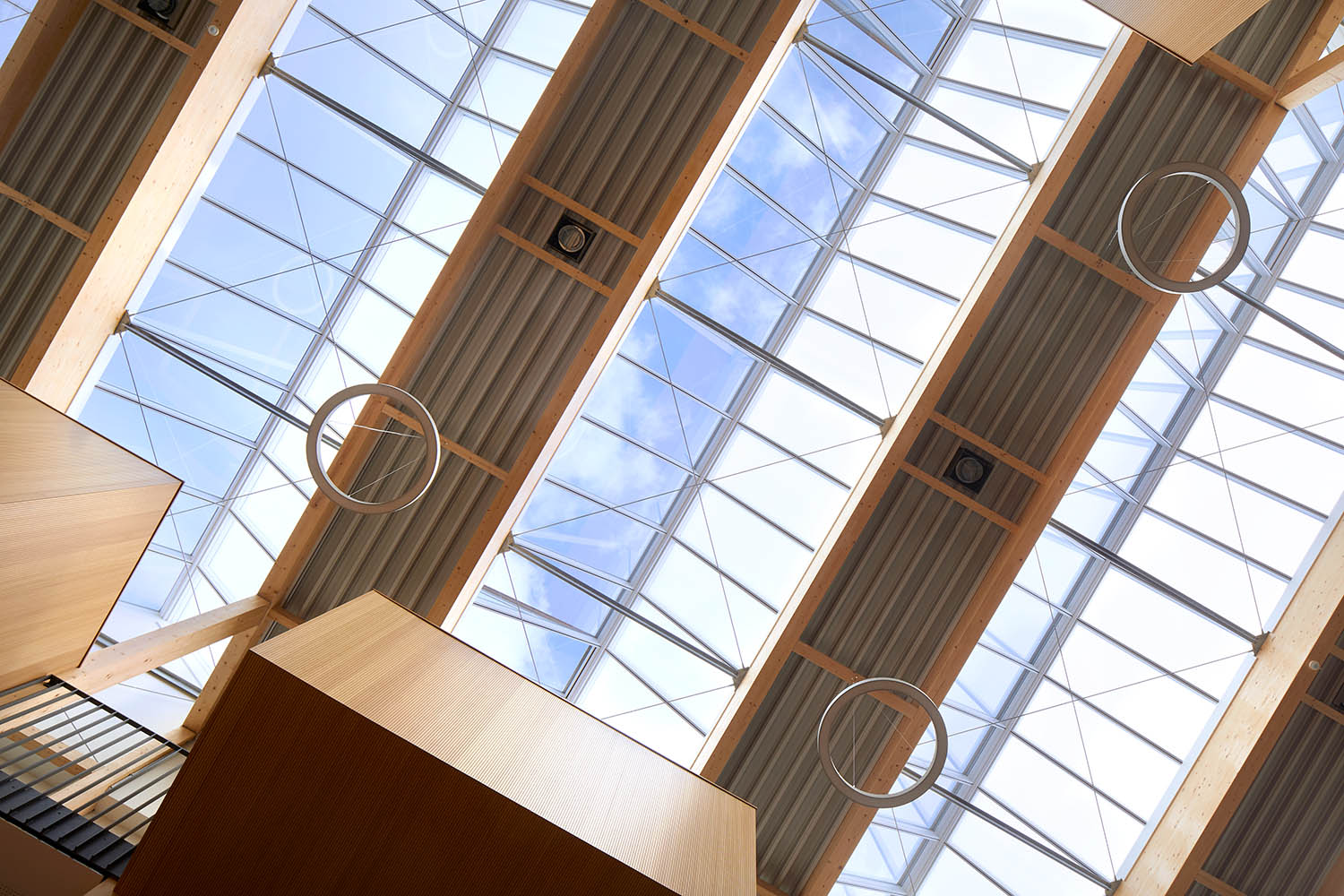
A school in Hamburg, Germany with multiple VELUX Modular Skylights

In 2018, the VELUX Group entered the smart home market with VELUX ACTIVE, an integrated system in one kit to address the global demand for smarter homes.

In 2020, the group launched a new sustainability strategy, a ten-year plan outlining initiatives on climate and nature action, sustainable product innovation, and responsible business practices. The strategy includes a commitment to account for both past and future carbon emissions.

In 2023, the first of seven new Co2-neutral demonstration buildings were inaugurated in Copenhagen. The project comprised two fully habitable houses and five test pavilions. The houses were part of the VELUX Group's 2030 housing concept "Living Places". The homes were sketched and designed according to EU's climate plan, which was based on the Paris Agreement's 2015 climate goals. The plan calls for a 40% reduction of greenhouse gases by 2030 compared to 1990 level.

In September 2024, the next generational transition was completed in the VKR Group. Ownership was now shared between the main shareholder Villum Foundation and the new A-shareholders, Lars Kann-Rasmussen's sons Jens and Mads Kann-Rasmussen.

== Organisation ==
VELUX has 20 production sites in 12 countries and sales companies in 37 countries.

The VELUX Group is owned by VKR Holding A/S, a limited company wholly owned by the VILLUM Foundation and members of the Kann-Rasmussen family. The VELUX Group’s financial results are incorporated into VKR Holding's consolidated accounts.

In 2024, the VELUX Group had a total revenue of EUR 2.96 billion while VKR Holding had a total revenue of EUR 3.87 billion. The same year, the VILLUM Foundation and the VELUX Foundation donated a total of EUR 169 million in charitable grants.

== Corporate identity ==
=== Branding ===
The VELUX trademark is the corporate trademark used in all regions for all products and communication within the VELUX Group.

=== Model Company Objective ===
Since 1965, VELUX has conducted business according to the Model Company Objective. The objective was formulated by Villum Kann Rasmussen and aims to create well-being for the people and the planet by transforming spaces using daylight and fresh air.

The Model Company Objective states that “The purpose of the Group is to develop a number of model companies, which cooperate in an exemplary manner. A model company works with solutions useful to society and treats its customers, partners, employees of all categories, shareholders and the planet better than most other companies. A model company makes a profit which can finance growth and maintain financial independence.”

This objective guides VELUX business practices, emphasising sustainability and the importance of creating healthy indoor environments. The company aims to set a positive example through its behaviour, respect for society, and responsible use of natural resources.

== Products ==
In addition to roof windows for flat roofs and pitched roofs, VELUX offers many other types of products such as blinds, roller shutters, sun tunnels, smart home products, flashing sets, vapour barrier collars and linings.

=== Roof windows for sloped roofs ===
The VELUX Group manufactures roof windows designed for pitched and sloped roofs, available in various configurations including top-hinged, centre-pivot, and roof-access models. Products are offered in single or multiple-frame versions, with double or triple glazing options.

An example of VELUX top-hung electric roof windows

In 2020, the company launched the VELUX 3-in-1 roof windows, a set of three individual sashes in a single frame.

All VELUX roof windows can be operated manually or electrically, and they can be combined with Intelligent Home Control solutions, such as the VELUX App. Electrical and solar-powered roof windows can be operated electronically and feature integrated rain sensors. Solar-powered roof windows have an integrated solar cell and the battery charges even in cloudy weather. Installing them does not require wiring.

=== Flat roof windows ===
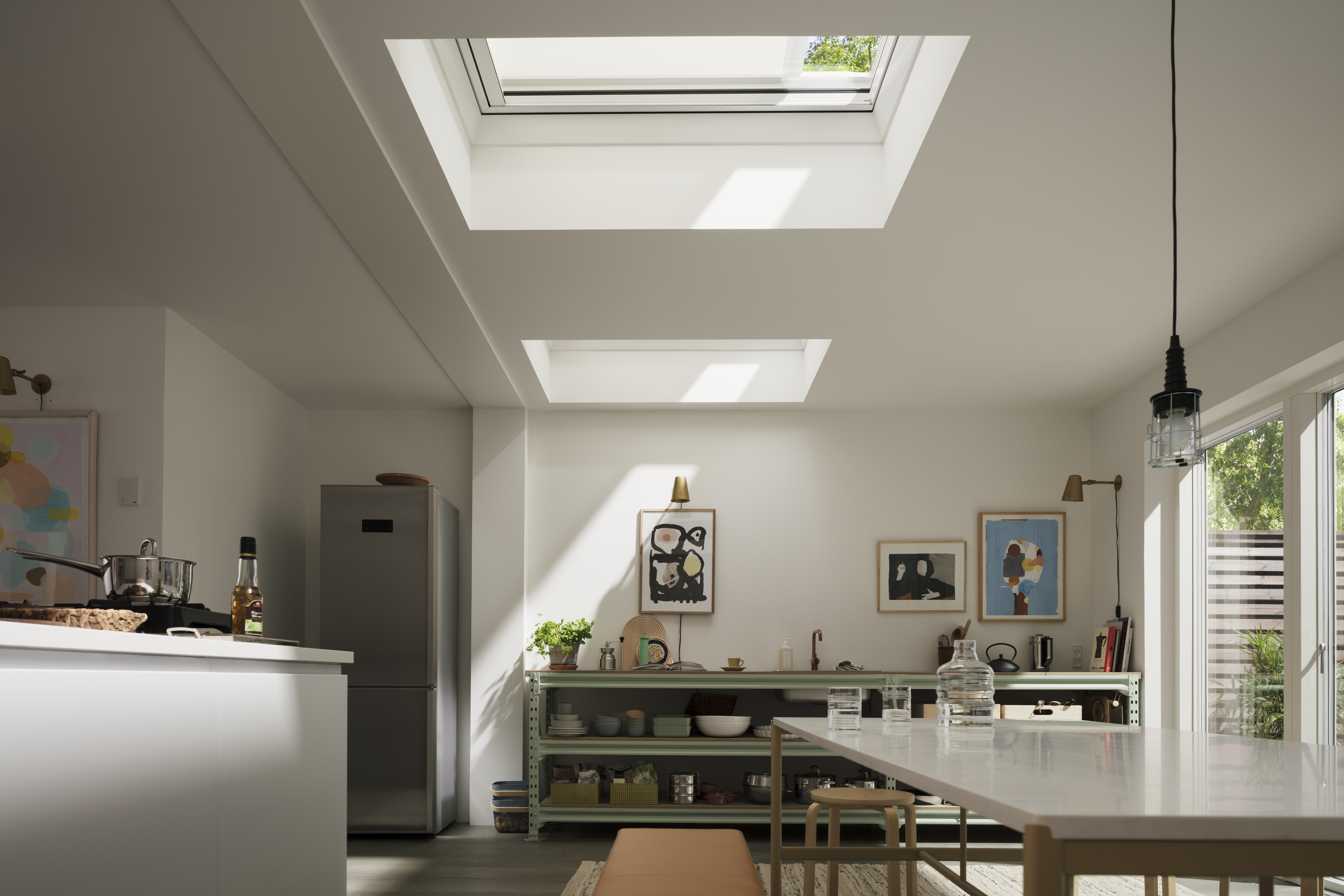
3D product render of VELUX flat roof windows

The VELUX Group manufactures flat roof windows designed for roofs with pitches between 0° and 15°. The VELUX Residential product range includes curved glass rooflights, flat glass rooflights, and dome models.

Curved and flat glass rooflights are available in fixed, electric, and solar-powered versions, while domes are offered as fixed, manually vented, or electric units. Blinds are available as optional accessories for all flat roof window models.

=== Roof balcony and terrace ===
The VELUX roof balcony combines a top-hung roof window features a lower section that extends outward to create a balcony space. The VELUX roof terrace features a top-hung roof window with a lower window element, that works like a door and provides access to the outdoors. Both models can be installed in combination with additional balcony and terrace modules for a wider view, with more daylight and fresh air.

=== Blinds, shutters and mosquito nets ===
The VELUX Group manufactures a range of interior and exterior shading and screening products, including blinds, shutters, awning blinds, and insect screens. Exterior products can be combined with interior decorative blinds and insect screens.

Interior blinds are designed to control light and include roller, pleated, venetian, and blackout models, as well as a combination “duo” blind that integrates translucent and blackout fabrics in a single unit. Most interior blinds are available in manual, electric, and solar-powered versions, except the duo model, which is operated manually.

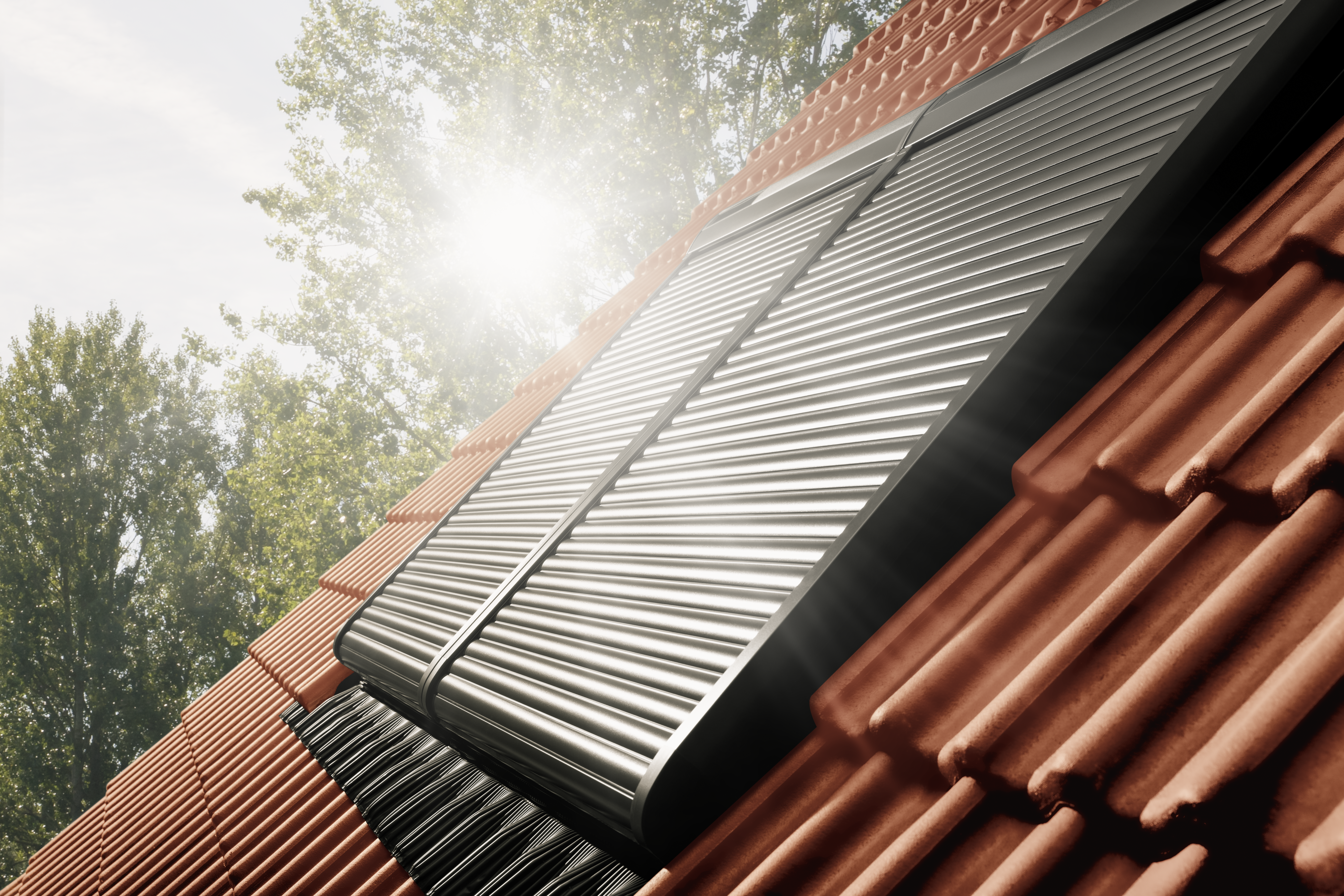
Sloped roof VELUX roof windows and VELUX roller shutters

Exterior products include roller shutters, soft shutters, and awning blinds. Roller shutters offer thermal insulation and blackout properties and are available in electric and solar-powered versions compatible with an app or a remote control system. According to a VELUX study conducted across 29 European cities, roller shutters may reduce indoor temperatures by up to 5 °C. Soft shutters provide heat and light control and are solar-powered. Awning blinds reduce solar heat gain and glare, and are available in manual, electric, and solar-powered variants.

Insect screens are made of transparent mesh fabric and can be installed on both sloped and flat roof windows.

=== Sun tunnels ===
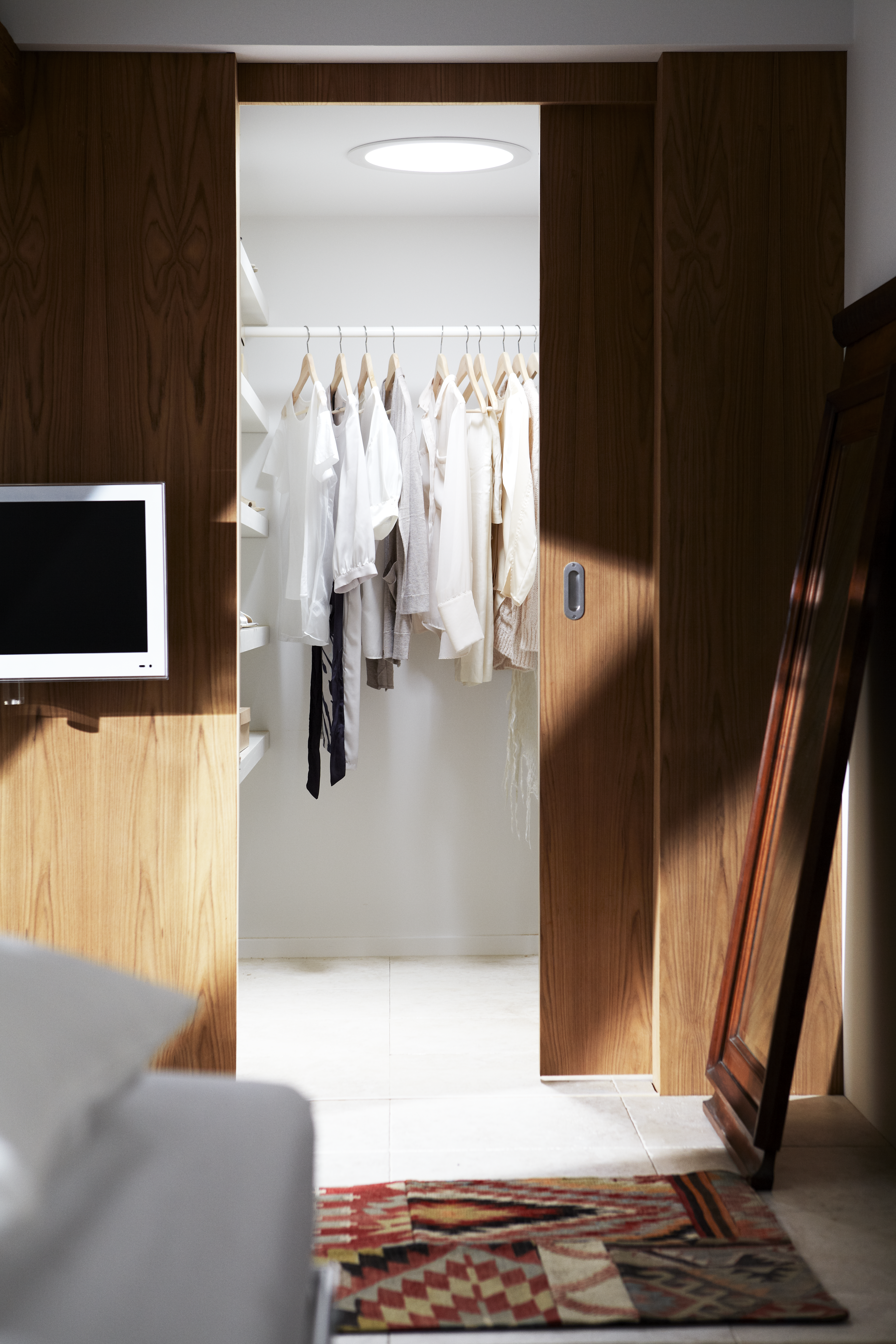
A walk-in closet with a VELUX sun tunnel

The VELUX Sun Tunnels were launched in 2005.

Sun tunnels use a reflective tube to bring daylight through the roof, allowing light in windowless spaces. They are available in rigid or flexible options for both sloped and flat roofs.

=== Smart home products ===
In 2018, the VELUX Group entered the smart home market with an app that can operate all electrical and solar-powered products from a smartphone.

Different options for electrical product operation are available, and it is possible to operate all electric and solar-powered VELUX windows, blinds and shutters with either a remote or an app.

The range of operation options include a basic wall switch, a multi product switch (VELUX Touch) and two smartphone apps (VELUX App Control and VELUX Active with NETATMO).

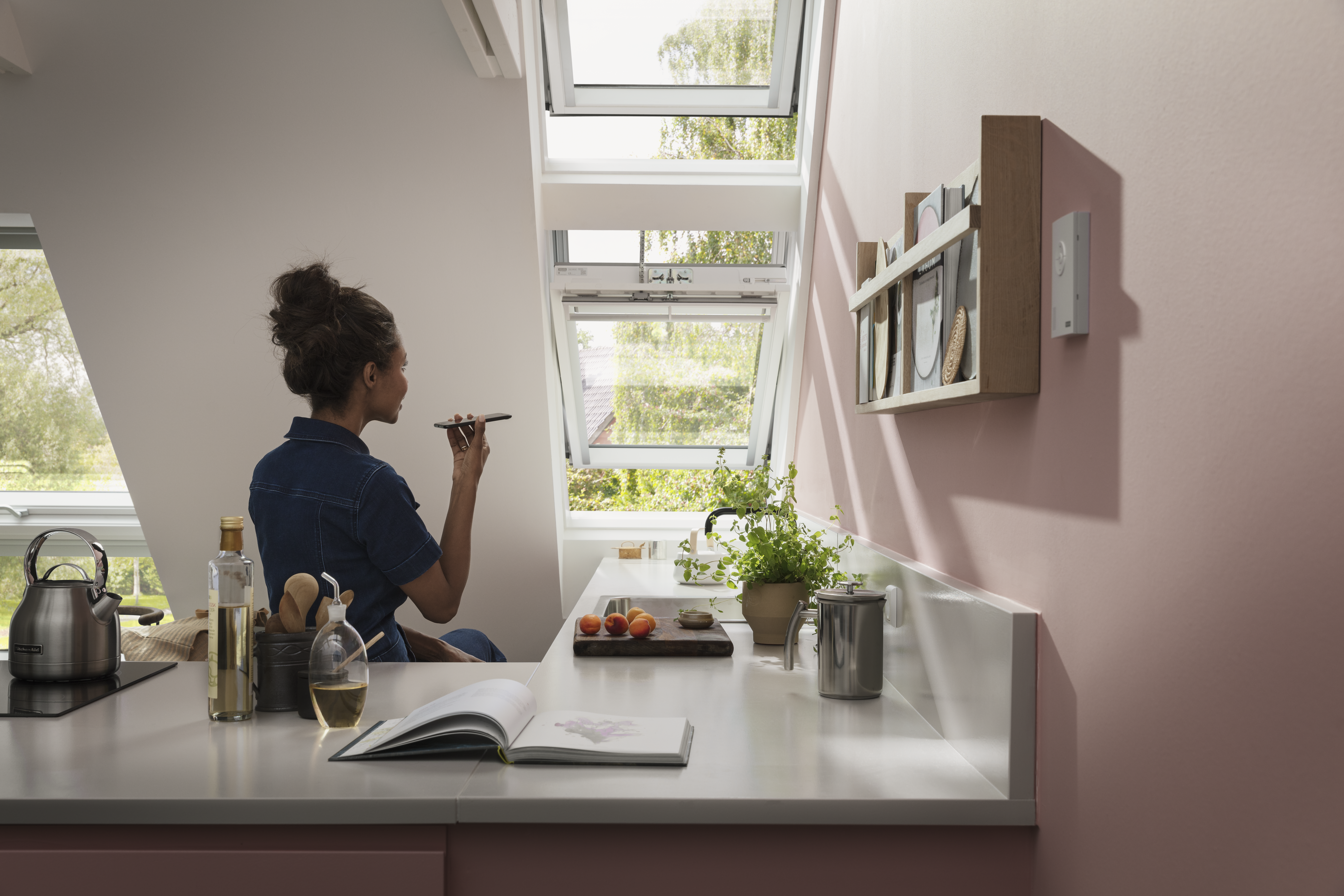
Woman operating an electric VELUX roof window through the smartphone app

VELUX Active with NETATMO includes indoor climate sensors to monitor temperature, CO2 and humidity in the home.

== Environmental record ==
=== Sustainability approach ===
Since 2011, the VELUX Group has published an annual sustainability report with comprehensive information about the company in the attempt to create more transparency on how the company seeks to reduce its negative social and environmental impact.

VELUX takes a value chain approach to sustainability and has set a number of sustainability targets to guide their efforts.

In 2020, the company established formal emission reduction targets aligned with climate science and validated by the Science Based Targets initiative (SBTi).

In 2023, the VELUX Group embedded sustainability into the corporate strategy to help ensure that sustainability is integrated across the business - from product development, material supply decisions and procurement, factory operations, to the end of life of their products.

In 2025, VELUX was awarded a Platinum rating by EcoVadis, placing them in the top 1% of companies ranked worldwide. EcoVadis is a global sustainability ratings organisation that assesses companies on their environmental, social, and governance (ESG) performance.

=== Demonstration buildings and Model Home 2020 ===
In 2009 the VELUX Group created the Model Home 2020, a project for sustainable buildings of the future according to the Active House vision of buildings: healthier, more comfortable buildings without negative impact on the environment. As part of the experiment, VELUX launched six full-scale CO2 neutral experimental houses in five European countries by 2011.

In 2012, Model Home 2020 was selected as one of the world’s 100 most sustainable projects in the Sustainia100 list.

By 2017, the VELUX Group had influenced more than 20 demonstration buildings around the world, where people could live, work, and go to school.

=== Healthy Buildings Barometer ===
Since 2015, VELUX has been releasing an annual research-based report to highlight the conditions of Europe’s building stock and show the importance of improving buildings to address health and climate concerns.

The Healthy Building Barometer 2024 was produced with Buildings Performance Institute Europe (BPIE), an independent centre of expertise in the energy performance of buildings. The report covers four major building types (homes, workplaces, schools and hospitals) and presents a framework with five dimensions that define a healthy building and guide actors in the building industry in ensuring healthy buildings.

=== Living Places ===
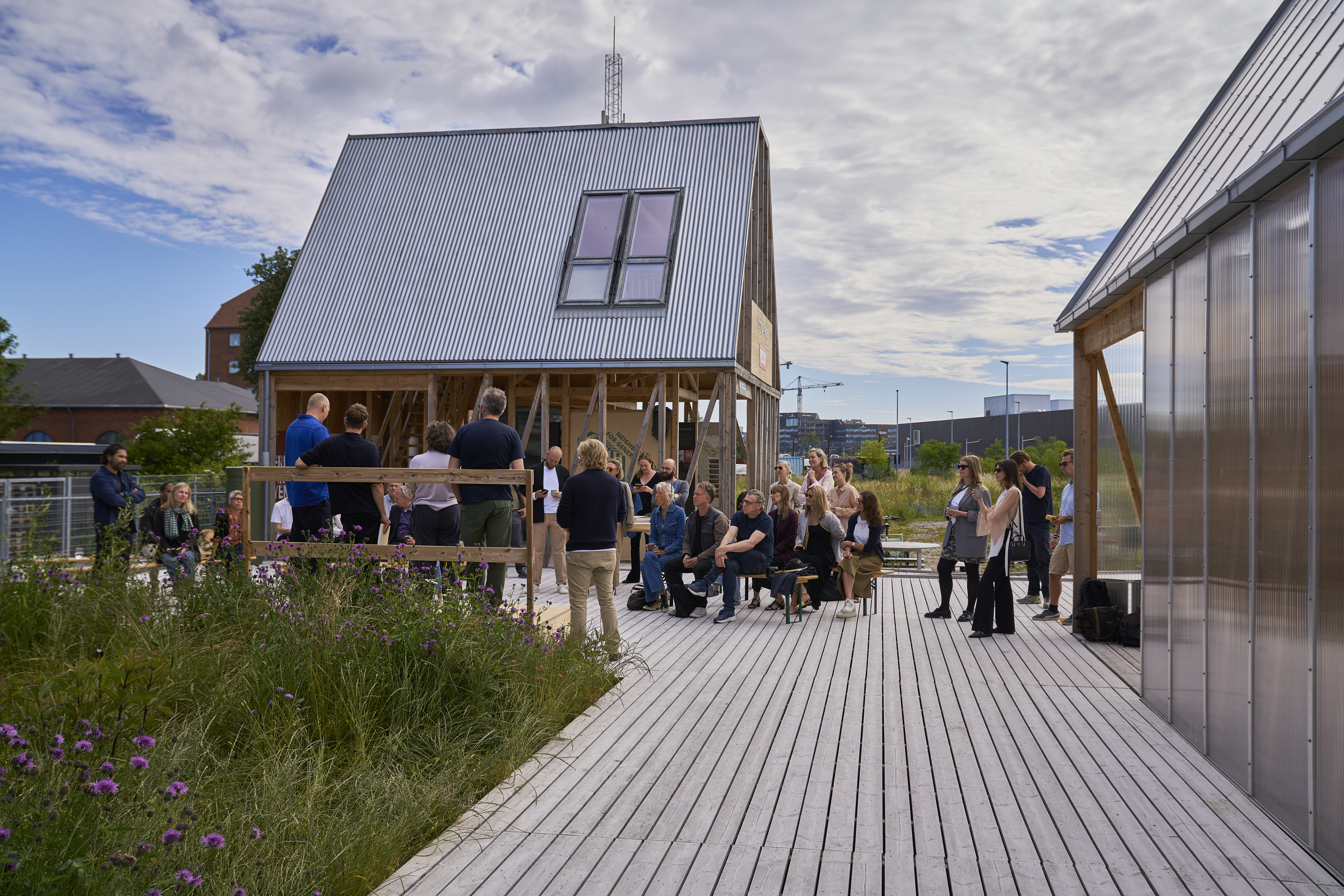
One of the houses of the Living Places project

In 2023, the VELUX Group partnered with EFFEKT and Artelia and created the Living Places concept, a project aimed at demonstrating that it is possible to build homes with a significantly lower carbon footprint and adequate indoor climate technologies.

The first Living Places prototype was built in Copenhagen in 2023 during the UIA World Congress of Architects and consisted of five open pavilions and two full-scale finished homes.

=== Conferences and talks ===
In 2004, the first International VELUX Award (since 2025 called Light of Tomorrow by VELUX) was launched, a biennial competition for architecture students to investigate the role of daylight in everyday living.

In 2005, the VELUX Group launched the Daylight Symposium, a biennial conference bringing together the community of architects, researchers and other building industry professionals to promote the exchange of knowledge on the potential of daylight for creating healthy buildings.

=== Partnerships ===
Over the years, the VELUX Group has partnered with different sustainability-focused members to drive progress in this area.

The VELUX Group has been a member of the Global Alliance for Buildings and Construction (GlobalABC) since 2015.

The VELUX Group has been part of the UN Global Compact (UNGC) since 2016.

In 2020, VELUX partnered with the World Wide Fund for Nature (WWF) with a stated target of capturing the equivalent of the company's historical carbon emissions by 2041.

The VELUX Group has been a member of CLG Europe and CLG UK since 2022.

In 2024, the VELUX Group achieved its first-ever full CDP score for climate change action and forest-related disclosures. Based on our 2023 data, they received an "A-" rating for Climate Change and a "B" rating for Forests.

== Sponsorships ==
The VELUX Group has been sponsoring several sports events during the years.

In 2006 until 2010-11, the VELUX Group sponsored the VELUX 5 Oceans Race a round-the-world single-handed yacht race, sailed in stages.

In 2010, the VELUX Group signed an agreement with EHF Marketing GmbH to become the first title sponsor of the European Club Handball Championships. The tournament was played under the name VELUX EHF Men's Champions League. The partnership lasted 10 years and ended in 2020.

In 2023 the VELUX Group sponsored the UCI Cyclo-Cross World Cup, the world championships for cyclo-cross by the Union Cycliste Internationale.

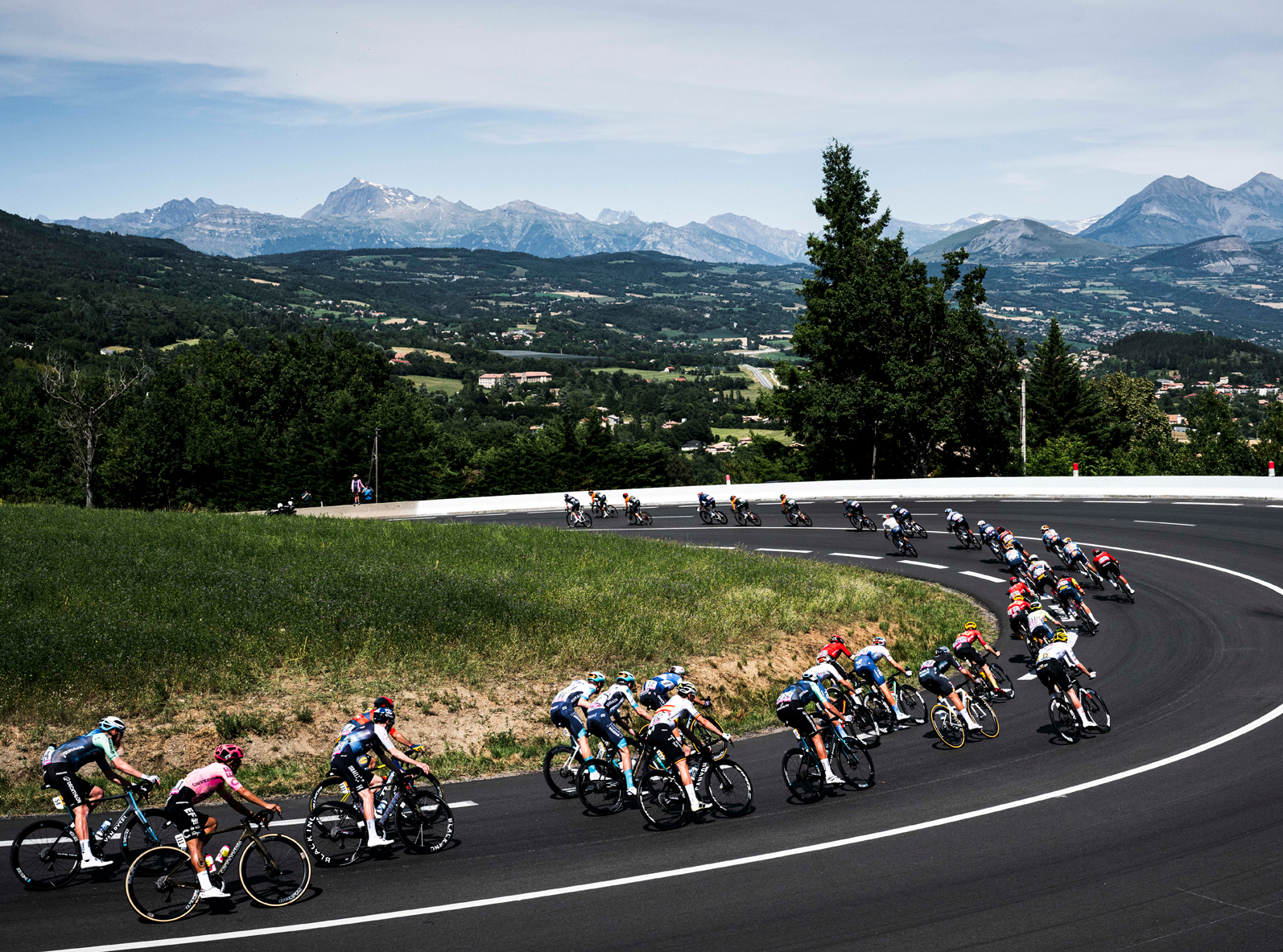
In 2025, VELUX became the official partner of Tour de France and Tour de France Femmes avec Zwift.

In 2024, the VELUX Group partnered with RCS Sports & Events to sponsor five globally-renowned road cycling races for women and men: Strade Bianche, Strade Bianche Women Elite, Giro d’Italia, Giro d’Italia Women and Il Lombardia races.

In 2025, the VELUX Group became an official partner of Tour de France and Tour de France Femmes avec Zwift, covering the 21-stages of the Tour de France event and the 9 stages of the Tour de France Femmes avec Zwift. Through the partnership, the VELUX brand was displayed on the bibs located on the back of each rider’s jersey together with their racing number.

== Leadership ==
=== Senior Management ===
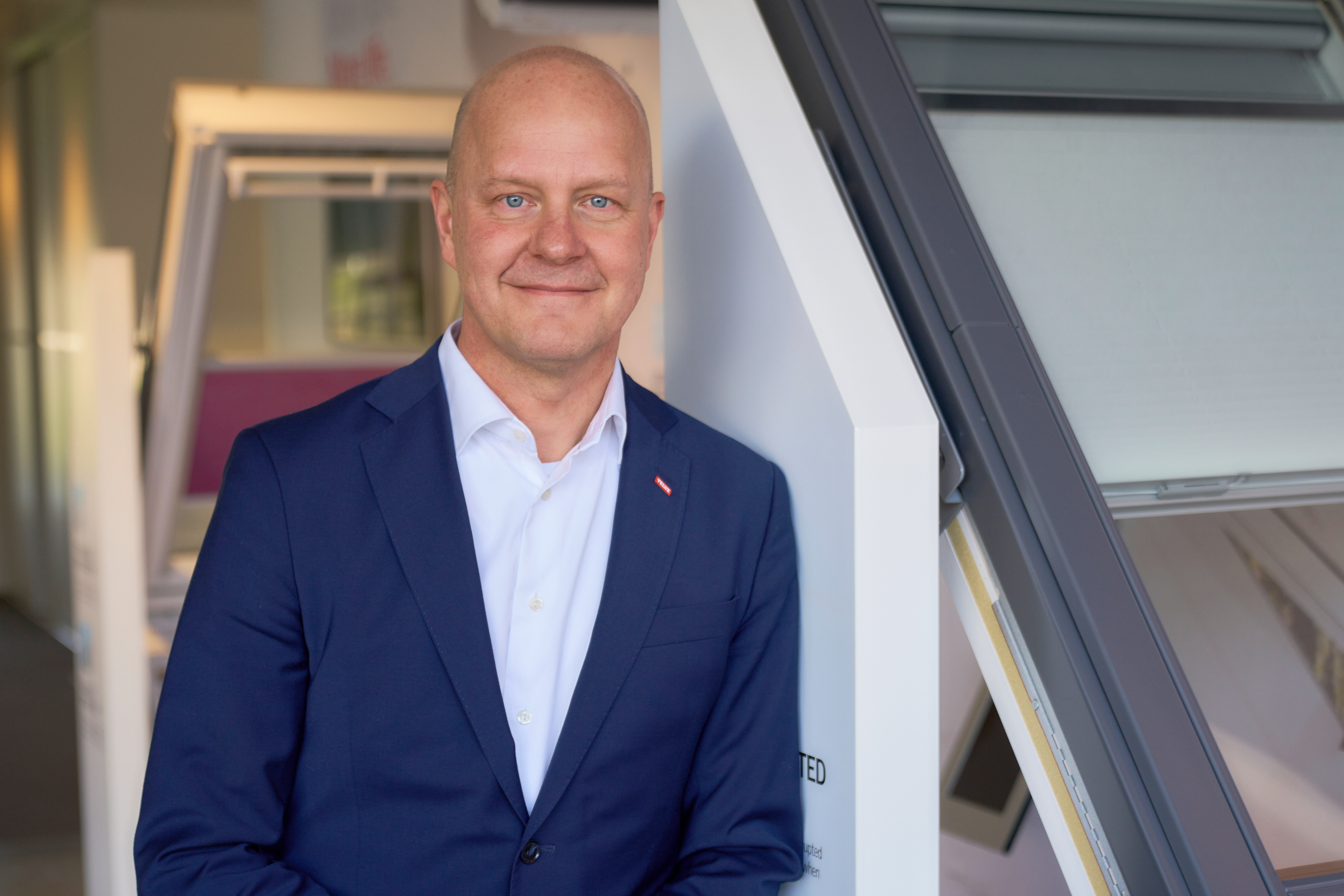
Lars Petersson, CEO of VELUX since 2022

As of 2022, the VELUX Group appointed Lars Petersson as Chief Executive Officer, succeeding David Briggs, who retired after a five-year term. Petersson joined VELUX from his previous role as CEO of Hempel A/S and holds an M.Sc. in industrial engineering and management from Chalmers University of Technology, along with an M.Sc. in mechanics from École Polytechnique Fédérale de Lausanne.

Other members of the executive leadership team include Anders Götzsche (Executive Vice President and CFO), Tina Mayn (Executive Vice President for Products & Innovation), Niklas Dyg (Executive Vice President Strategy & Sales Development), Iben Schmidt Helbirk (Executive Vice President People & Organisation), Raffaella Berardo (Executive Vice President Region Southwest Europe), Anders Dam Vestergaard (Executive Vice President Region North America, CEE, APAC & Altaterra) and Barnabas Szabo (Executive Vice President Operations & Supply).

=== Board of Directors ===
The board of the VELUX Group is chaired by Jørgen Jensen, who has served as Chair of the Board since December 2019. The board is complemented by vice-chairs including Henrik Lange and Mads Kann-Rasmussen.

Other members include Karina Deacon, Eva Birgitte Bisgaard, HansJürgen Kalmbach, Gloria Glang, Kjeld Duborg, Jimmy B. Laursen and Finn W. Christiansen.

=== Ownership ===
The VELUX Group is owned by VKR Holding A/S, a limited company owned by the Villum Foundation and members of the Kann Rasmussen family.
